= Women's detachment of Ukrainian Sich Riflemen =

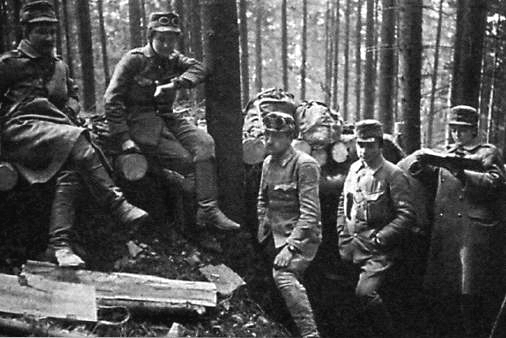
USS Officers Zenon Noskovsky, Olena Stepaniv, Ivan Chmola, Osyp Yarimovych and Sofia Halechko on Mount Makivka

The USS-II women's detachment was a division of the Legion of Ukrainian Sich Riflemen. Formed before the First World War and passed through the trials of this war.

The exact number of riflewomen is unknown, as the list of names has not been preserved, there is no information on which unit they were part of, and not all women enrolled in the USS fought. The names of 34 women who were probably at the front are known, including Olga Pidvysotska, Maria Bachynska, Gandzia Dmyterko, Vasylyna Oshchypko, Olena (Yarema) Kuz, Pavlyna Mykhailyshyn, Stefania Siyak, Stefania Novakivska and Olena Stepaniv.

Despite the widespread myth that Ukrainian women were the first women at the front, in fact even before the war, Olena Stepaniv wrote that they were significantly influenced by the example of military training of Polish women, who also took part in hostilities during the war. In addition, during the First World War, women had the legal right to fight in the Russian Empire and in Great Britain (the laws of Austria-Hungary did not allow it).

Women - shooters and nurses - took part in the battles near Makivka. After this battle, Olena Stepaniv and Sofia Halechko were awarded silver medals of bravery.

== Sources ==
- Мар'яна Байдак. Втеча і повернення: українки в лавах Січових стрільців // Україна Модерна. — 13.10.2016
