= Olha Basarab =

Ukrainian activist and humanitarian (1889–1924)

- Ольга Михайлівна Басараб
- Basarab in the uniform of the Ukrainian Sich Riflemen
- Born: Olha Mykhailivna Levytska; 1 September 1889; Near Rohatyn, Galicia-Lodomeria, Austria-Hungary (now Ukraine)
- Died: 12 February 1924 (aged 34); Lwów, Second Polish Republic
- Occupations: Political activist, member of Ukrainian Military Organization
- Known for: Charitable work, political activism, alleged espionage
- Spouse: Dmytro Basarab (m. 1914; d. 1915)

Olha Mykhailivna Basarab (Ukrainian: Ольга Михайлівна Басараб, née Levytska; 1 September 1889 – 12 February 1924) was a Ukrainian political activist and member of the Ukrainian Military Organization who conducted both charitable and humanitarian work that was recognized by the International Red Cross, as well as military or intelligence work on behalf of the Ukrainian underground. Basarab was an executive of the Ukrainian Women's Union branch in Lviv. She was arrested by the Polish police after being accused of working with the Ukrainian Military Organization and of spying for Germany (with whom the Ukrainian Military Organization had a working relationship). Materials indicating cooperation with Germany's intelligence were found at her home. Different accounts of her death in prison exist ranging from suicide to murder. Afterwards, Basarab was seen as a martyr and source of inspiration within the Ukrainian community.

== Biography ==
Olha Basarab was born Olha Levytska in 1889 into a family of petty gentry (coat-of-arms Rogala) near the town of Rohatyn. In 1912 she attended a meeting organised by Konstantyna Malytska for the "Women's Committee" in Lviv to prepare for war. Others at the meeting were Olena Zalizniak, Maria Biletska, and Olena Stepaniv. The money raised from the "National Combat Fund" they recommended was used to fund the Ukrainian Sich Riflemen.

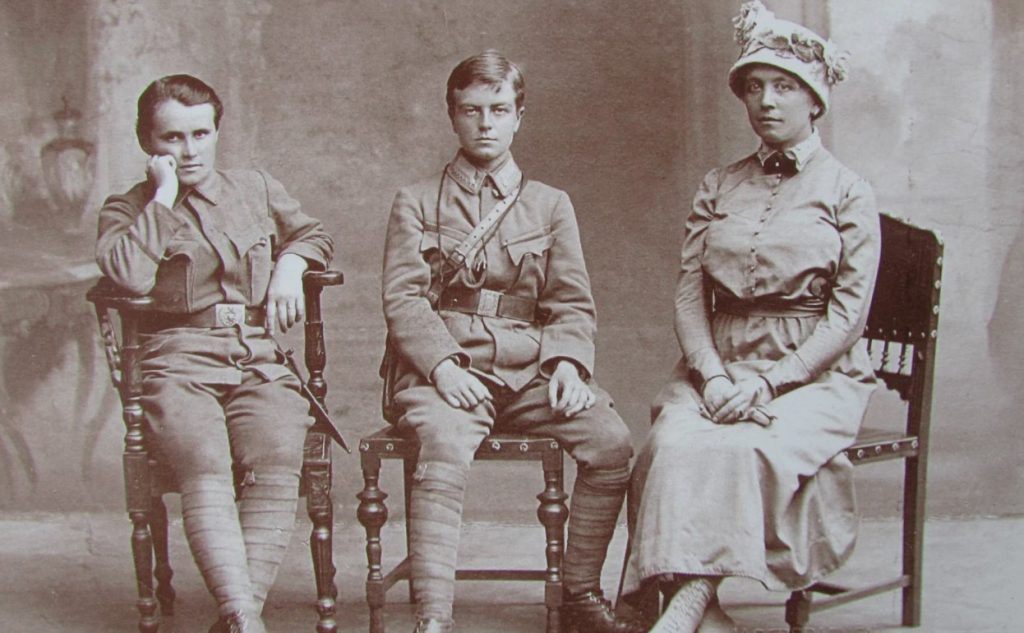
Hanna Dmyterko, Sofia Halechko and Olha Basarab in 1917

In 1914 she married Dmytry Basarab, who died fighting for Austria on the Italian front in 1915. During World War I, Basarab was a member of the first Women's Platoon of the Ukrainian Sich Riflemen, a unit of Ukrainian volunteers within the Austrian army.

After the war Basarab worked from 1918 to 1923 as an accountant for the Embassy of Ukraine in Vienna, she also visited Denmark, Germany, Norway, and other states to collect military and political intelligence. She was involved in charity work involving helping wounded soldiers and civilians and was recognized by the International Red Cross for her efforts. Active in Ukrainian political organizing, Basarab helped organize Ukrainian soldiers and was a member of the Ukrainian Women's Union in Vienna and a member of the Supreme Executive of the Union of Ukrainian Women in Lviv.

In 1923 Basarab started working with the Ukrainian Military Organization, where her liaison was Yevhen Konovalets. She was accused by the Polish authorities of working with intelligence from Germany and Bolshevik Ukraine in Poland and belonging to the Ukrainian Military Organization (UVO), which organised assassinations of Poles and Ukrainians. After her imprisonment, materials concerning cooperation with German intelligence were found (the UVO signed an agreement in May 1923 with Weimar Germany's intelligence service, according to which the UVO would conduct espionage work against Poland, while the German side was to provide financial aid and military equipment). Basarab was detained by Polish security forces and died in prison under unclear circumstances.

The Polish government was accused of torturing her to death, although this accusation was never conclusively proven. Martha Bohachevsky-Chomiak from the Canadian Institute of Ukrainian Studies claims the Polish government initially presented her death as a suicide but subsequent exhumation of her body showed that she had been murdered in their custody. Basarab's death resulted in protests from Ukrainians, demands an inquiry from Ukrainian members of the Polish Sejm, and calls from the Jewish members of the Polish parliament to investigate prisoner conditions in Polish jails. Her body was exhumed on 26 February, and the Polish forensic expert stated that she had died by hanging. He declined to publicly identify the bruises on her body as being the results of beatings, although his student stated that he had told her during the autopsy that Basarb's body showed traces of having been beaten. Rumors spread in Lviv that police tortured people through the use of electric shocks.
