= Terlecki =

Polish surname

Terlecki (feminine: Terlecka; plural: Terleccy) is a Polish surname, if nobleman might be Klamry or Sas coat of arms. In other language variants: Terlecky, Terlesky, Terlezki (English), Terletzki (German), Terleckas (Lithuanian). Notable people include:

- Andrzej Terlecki (1952–2012), Polish politician
- Bob Terlecki (born 1945), American baseball player
- Cyril Terlecki (died 1607), Ukrainian bishop
- Hipolit Terlecki (1806–1890), Polish theologian
- Josephine Terlecki (born 1986), German athlete
- Ivan Terlecki better known as Libon (born 1972), French cartoonist
- Maciej Terlecki (born 1977), Polish footballer
- Metodije Terlecki (died 1649), bishop of the Bishopric of Chelm
- Ryszard Terlecki (born 1949), Polish historian and politician
- Stanisław Terlecki (1955–2017), Polish footballer
- Władysław Lech Terlecki (1933–1999), Polish writer

== Variants ==
- Frank Terletzki (born 1950), German football coach and player
- Greg Terlecky (born 1952), Major League Baseball pitcher
- John Terlesky (born 1961), American actor, film director, television director and screenwriter
- Stefan Terlezki (1927–2006), British Conservative politician
- Vladas Terleckas (born 1939), Lithuanian politician
