= Ivan L. Rudnytsky =

Historian of Ukraine (1919–1984)

Ivan Lysiak-Rudnytsky
- Іван Лисяк-Рудницький
- Lysiak-Rudnytsky in 1982
- Born: Joannes Lysiak; 27 October 1919; Vienna, Austria
- Died: 25 April 1984 (aged 64); Edmonton, Canada
- Spouses: Mary Joanne Benton (m. 1949; div. 1966); Alexandra (Lesia) Chernenko (m. 1968)
- Children: Peter; Elizabeth
- Parents: Milena Rudnytska; Pavlo Lysiak
- Relatives: Ivan Kedryn-Rudnytsky (uncle); Myhailo Rudnytsky (uncle); Antin Rudnytsky (uncle); John F. Benton (brother in law)

Academic background
- Education: University of Lviv; Friedrich-Wilhelms-Universität; Karl-Ferdinands-Universität (Phd, Prague 1945); Geneva Graduate Institute (1946-51); Columbia University (1951-53)
- Thesis: Mychajlo Drahomanov: A contribution to the development of political ideas in Eastern Europe ((in German)) (1945)
- Doctoral advisor: Eduard Winter
- Influences: Mykhailo Drahomanov; Vyacheslav Lypynsky; Stepan Tomashivsky

Academic work
- Discipline: History
- Institutions: University of Wisconsin; La Salle University; American University; University of Alberta
- Main interests: History of Ukraine
- Notable works: Essays in Modern Ukrainian History
- Influenced: Orest Subtelny; Zenon Kohut

Ivan Pavlovych Lysiak-Rudnytsky (Ukrainian: Іван Павлович Лисяк-Рудницький, 27 October 1919 – 25 April 1984) was a historian of Ukrainian socio-political thought, political scientist and scholar publicist. He wrote over 200 historical essays, commentaries, and reviews, and edited several book publications. He has been praised as one of the most influential Ukrainian historians of the twentieth century. He is sometimes referred to as Ivan Łysiak-Rudnytsky, but the surname he used was his mother’s name Rudnytsky.

== Personal background ==
Ivan Rudnytsky was born in Vienna, Austria, where his parents were residing as political refugees from Galicia, which had been invaded by Poland in the aftermath of its successful war against the West Ukrainian People's Republic (1918 – 1919). His father Pavlo Lysiak was a lawyer and his mother Milena Rudnytska was a professor and politician. Both were social and political activists from well-connected families.

Ivan grew up within the stimulating environment of the extended Rudnytsky family: Ivan Kedryn-Rudnytsky (prominent political leader and publicist of Ukrainian identity), Myhailo Rudnytsky (literary scholar, literary critic, translator), Antin Rudnytsky (conductor and composer) and Volodymyr Rudnytsky (lawyer and social activist). After his parents divorced when Ivan was 2 years old, he lived with his mother. However, his material needs to support his intellectual pursuits were taken care of, up to 1953, in large part due to his father and mother’s financial help.

=== Intellectual development ===
Rudnytsky began his academic career at the University of Lviv in interwar Poland, where he studied law in the years 1937–1939. After the Soviet annexation of Galicia, his mother believed it was only a matter of time before the NKVD would arrest her, and so she fled with her son to Kraków, and then in 1940 to Berlin. There, he was awarded his master's degree in international relations in 1943 from the Friedrich Wilhelm University. Fearing discovery of their Jewish heritage, he fled with his mother to Prague, Czechoslovakia and continued his studies at Karl-Ferdinands-Universität, receiving his doctorate in History in 1945. His doctoral advisor was the noted scholar of slavic studies, Eduard Winter, who held Rudnytsky’s oral doctoral defence on a Prague street during an air raid before Soviet occupation.

Driven by a desire to combat the influence of the Ukrainian nationalists, Rudnytsky became a leading member of several student organizations in the 1940s. He was a member of the Ukrainian student society "Mazepyneć", the Ukrainian Student Group in Prague, and the Nationalist Organization of Ukrainian Students of Greater Germany (together with Vasyl Rudko and Omeljan Pritsak). He was briefly a member of a conservative, monarchist hetmanite organization but was expelled in 1940 by the leadership for meeting an old acquaintance of his mother’s who was associated with the Ukrainian People's Republic, an action they regarded as political treason.

After the war, Rudnytsky attended the Geneva Graduate Institute where he worked on his second doctorate and where in 1949 he met and married an American Quaker, Joanne Benton. Rudnytsky studied English intensely, and in 1951, he emigrated to the USA. Having been informed it would be difficult to secure a good professorship without a US degree, he resumed work on his second doctoral dissertation at Columbia. By 1953, his funding had run out, and he took a position teaching history at the University of Wisconsin in Madison and later at La Salle University in Philadelphia from 1956 to 1967. He received his first permanent position in 1967 at the American University in Washington D.C. From 1971 to his death in 1984, he was a professor at the University of Alberta, a founder of the Canadian Institute of Ukrainian Studies (CIUS), a member of the Shevchenko Scientific Society and the Ukrainian Free Academy of Sciences.

== Focus of work ==
As a result of his early interest in German transcendental philosophy of the 19th and 20th centuries, Rudnytsky’s chief academic interest became the study of historical cognition. In keeping with the evolutionary outlook characteristic of German idealism, Rudnytsky employed history to understand the development of socio-political thought, particularly in Ukraine, from the mid-nineteenth century to the 1930s.

The main focus of Rudnytsky’s work revolved around the following topics:

1. The concept and problem of “historical” and “non-historical” nations;
2. The intellectual origins of modern Ukraine and the structure of nineteenth-century Ukrainian history;
3. The problem of the intelligentsia and intellectual development in Ukraine in the nineteenth and twentieth centuries;
4. Galicia under the Habsburg Empire and its contribution to the Ukrainian struggle for statehood;
5. The Ukrainian revolution of 1917—21 and the Fourth Universal in the historical context of Ukrainian political thought, or autonomy vs. independence;
6. Ukraine within the Soviet system;
7. Galician Ukrainian inter-war nationalism;
8. Ukrainians and their nearest neighbours, the Poles and the Russians;
9. 1848 in Galicia: an evaluation of political pamphlets.

== Legacy ==
According to Eastern European historian Timothy Snyder, Rudnytsky decisively argued against the proposition that Ukraine ought to be a homogeneous nation, that it should be exclusively for and about people who spoke Ukrainian and shared Ukrainian culture. Rudnytsky believed, as Mykhailo Hrushevsky did, in Ukraine's social historical continuity of development towards an independent democratic nation, and also believed, as Vyacheslav Lypynsky did, that its destiny was to be pluralistic. The opposing view in Ukraine was championed by Dmytro Dontsov who took his cues from Italian fascism and became the far right conservative voice of Ukrainian ethnic nationalism. According to Snyder, Rudnytsky’s response to ethnic nationalism won the argument, both in Ukraine and among North American Ukrainian expatriates, about what the Ukrainian nation should be. Instead of the nation looking for legitimacy in dubious historical claims or assertions of a homogeneous culture, Rudnytsky’s view was that a nation is fundamentally the result of political acts of commitment directed at a common future, which means that, in principle, anyone can take part in it.

== Works ==
=== Books ===
- Rudnytsky, Ivan L. (1988) [1987]. Essays in Modern Ukrainian History. Cambridge, Massachusetts: Harvard University Press. ISBN 9780916458195.
- Basarab, John; Rudnytsky, Ivan L. (1982). Pereiaslav 1654: A Historiographical Study. Edmonton: Canadian Institute of Ukrainian Studies Press (CIUS) Press, University of Alberta. ISBN 978-0920862162.

Books in Ukrainian:

- Rudnytsky, Ivan L. (2019). Hrytsak, Yaroslav; Sysyn, Frank E. (eds.). Щоденники [Diaries of Ivan L. Rudnytsky] (in Ukrainian). Edmonton, Alberta: Canadian Institute of Ukrainian Studies (CIUS), University of Alberta. ISBN 9789663787084. Archived from the original on 27 November 2022.
- Rudnytsky, Ivan L. (1973). Між історією й політикою: Статті до історії та критики української [Between History and Politics:Articles on the History and Criticism of Ukraine] (in Ukrainian). Munich: Suchasnist.
- Rudnytsky, Ivan L. (1994). Hrytsak, Yaroslav (ed.). Історичні есе: два томи [Historical Essays: Two Volumes] (in Ukrainian). Kyiv: Dukh i Litera Publishers. ISBN 5770764856.

==== Rudnytsky edited books ====
- Rudnytsky, Ivan L.; Himka, John-Paul, eds. (1981). Rethinking Ukrainian History. Edmonton, Alberta: Canadian Institute of Ukrainian Studies (CIUS) Press (University of Alberta). ISBN 978-0920862124.
- Rudnytsky, Ivan L., ed. (1952). Mykhaylo Drahomanov : a Symposium and Selected Writings. New York: The Ukrainian Academy Of Arts And Sciences.

=== Individual essays ===
- Rudnytsky, Ivan L. (1987). Essays in Modern Ukrainian History. Edmonton, Alberta: Canadian Institute of Ukrainian Studies (CIUS), University of Alberta. ISBN 0-920862-47-0.

| •Ukraine between East and West. •The Role of Ukraine in Modern History. •Observations on the Problem of "Historical" and "Non-historical" Nations. •Polish-Ukrainian Relations: The Burden of History. •Pereiaslav: History and Myth. •Trends in Ukrainian Political Thought. •The Intellectual Origins of Modern Ukraine. •Hipolit Vladimir Terlecki. •Michal Czajkowski's Cossack Project During the Crimean War: An Analysis of Ideas. •Franciszek Duchinski and His Impact on Ukrainian Political Thought. •Drahomanov as a Political Theorist. •The First Ukrainian Political Program: Mykhailo Drahomanovʼs "Introduction" to Hromada. | •Mykhailo Drahomanov and the Problem of Ukrainian-Jewish Relations. •The Problem of Ukrainian-Jewish Relations in Nineteenth-Century Ukrainian Political Thought. •The Ukrainians in Galicia under Austrian Rule. •Carpatho-Ukraine: A People in Search of Their Identity. •The Ukrainian National Movement on the Eve of the First World War. •The Fourth Universal and Its Ideological Antecedents. •Volodymyr Vynnychenko's Ideas in the Light of His Political Writings. •Viacheslav Lypynsky: Statesman, Historian, and Political Thinker. •Lypynsky's Political Ideas from the Perspective of Our Time. •Soviet Ukraine in Historical Perspective. •The Political Thought of Soviet Ukrainian Dissidents. |

- Rudnytsky, Ivan L. (2014) [1984]. "Various articles". Encyclopedia of Ukraine. Edmonton: Canadian Institute of Ukrainian Studies. ISBN 9780802034168. OCLC 724265856.
  - Drahomanov, Mykhailo. Vol. 1. (WP article: Mykhailo Drahomanov)
  - Ukrainian Radical party. Vol. 5. 1993. (WP article: Ukrainian Radical party))
  - Conservatism. Vol. 1. 1984.
  - Nationalism. Vol. 3. 1993.
  - Feudalism. Vol. 1. 1984.
  - Transcarpathia. Vol. 5. 1993. (WP article: Transcarpathia)
  - Lypynsky, Viacheslav. 2009. (WP article: Vyacheslav Lypynsky)
  - Masaryk, Tomáš Garrigue. Vol. 3. 1993. (WP article: Tomáš Masaryk)
  - Poles in Ukraine. Vol. 3. 1993.
  - Terletsky, Ipolit Volodymyr. Vol. 5. 1993. (WP article: Hipolit Volodymyr Terletsky)

== Bibliography ==
- Dunch, Ryan (2019). "Symposium:Ivan Lysiak Rudnytsky: Diarist, Historian, Political Thinker". Canadian Institute of Ukrainian Studies. University of Alberta. Archived from the original on 25 November 2022.
- "Rudnytsky, Ivan Lysiak". Encyclopedia of Ukraine. Shevchenko Scientific Society. 2022.
- Genkin, Maria (26 October 2021). "The Conflicting Life of Dmytro Dontsov: A Review of Trevor Erlacher's Ukrainian Nationalism in the Age of Extremes". Apofenie.
- Gyidel, Ernest (2019). "A historian of a "non-historical" nation- Ivan L. Rudnytsky and development of Ukrainian Studies in North America" (pdf). Academia.edu. University of Alberta.
- Hrytsak, Yaroslav (2020). "Ivan L. Rudnytsky and His Visit to the Soviet Union (1970)". In Achilli, Alessandro (ed.). Cossacks in Jamaica, Ukraine at the Antipodes. Academic Studies Press. ISBN 978-1644693018.
- Koshelivets, Ivan (1993). "Mykhailo Rudnytsky". Encyclopedia of Ukraine. Vol. 4. Shevchenko Scientific Society.
- Ohloblyn, Oleksander; Wynar, Lubomyr (1989). "Hrushevsky, Mykhailo". Encyclopedia of Ukraine. Vol. 2. Shevchenko Scientific Society.
- Rudnytsky, Peter (1987). "Preface". Essays in Modern Ukrainian History. Cambridge, Massachusetts: Harvard University Press. ISBN 9780916458195.
- Pritsak, Omeljan (1987). "Ivan Lysiak-Rudnytsky, Scholar and "Communicator". In Rudnytsky, Peter (ed.). Essays in Modern Ukrainian History. Cambridge, Massachusetts: Harvard University Press. ISBN 9780916458195.
- Snyder, Timothy (28 January 2022). "Part 6: Nation of Choice". King of Ukraine. Substack Thinking about.
- Snyder, Timothy (8 September 2022). The Making of Modern Ukraine. Class 2: The Genesis of Nations (lecture video). Yalecourses (Yale university) – via YouTube. "See 33:10 for Hrushevsky's social historian contribution. See 37:04 for Lypynsky's response to those misusing Hrushevshky and equating the nation with a particular ethnic culture. See 41:28 for establishing this historical context for Rudnytsky's contribution (nation as a political act directed at the future) and Snyder's statement that Rudnytsky's response to Dontsov and the ethnic nationalists is decisive ("he wins"). Click Youtube options ( • • • )for complete transcript."
- Winter, Eduard (1981). Mein Leben im Dienst des Völkerverständnisses- nach Tagebuchaufzeichnungen, Briefen, Dokumenten und Erinnerungen. Akademie-Verlag.
- Wytwycky, Wasyl (1993). "Antin Rudnytsky". Encyclopedia of Ukraine. Vol. 4. Shevchenko Scientific Society.
- Yaniv, Sofiia (1993). "Kedryn, Ivan". Encyclopedia of Ukraine. Vol. 4. Shevchenko Scientific Society.
