= Olena Zalizniak =

Educator and civic leader in Ukraine and Canada

- Born: Olena Julianivna Okhrymovych; March 21, 1886; Senechiv, Dolyna, Ivano-Frankivsk Oblast, Austria-Hungary
- Died: June 12, 1969 (aged 83); Montreal, Quebec, Canada
- Education: Lviv University
- Occupations: Teacher, civic leader
- Spouse: Mykola Zalizniak
- Children: 2

Olena Julianivna Zalizniak (née Ochrymovych; March 21, 1886 – June 12, 1969) was an educator and civic leader in Ukraine and Canada. She led the World Federation of Ukrainian Women's Organizations from 1956 to 1969.

== Life ==
Olena Julianivna Okhrymovych was born in Senechiv, Dolyna, Ivano-Frankivsk Oblast in 1886, one of nine children born to Reverend Julian Okhrymovych and Maria (née Ochrymovych) Kobliansky. In 1912, she attended a meeting, organized by Konstantyna Malytska. For the "Women's Committee" in Lviv to prepare for war. Others at the meeting were Olha Basarab, Maria Biletska and Olena Stepaniv. The money raised from the "National Combat Fund" they created was used to fund the Ukrainian Sich Riflemen.

She moved to Vienna as the second world war started. Her husband, Mykola Zalizniak, was arrested by the Soviets in 1945 and sentenced to fifteen years in prison, where he died. Zalizniak moved to Canada in 1950 where she joined the Ukrainian Women's Organization of Canada. She led the World Federation of Ukrainian Women's Organizations as its president from 1956 to 1969. Zalizniak died in Montreal in 1969.
