= Ukrainian Women's Union =

Women's rights organization in Ukraine

Members of one of the local branches of the Ukrainian Women's Union

The Ukrainian Women's Union (Ukrainian: Союз українок) (1920–1938) was the most influential women's organization operating among Ukrainian women outside of Soviet Ukraine. Because they represented Ukrainian nationals living in other sovereign states, the organization solidified their struggle for gender recognition with one for nationalist aims. Formed in Lviv in 1920, the organization did not focus on traditional feminist issues of equality and political agency until after they had built up a base membership and helped improve the social and economic lives of the peasantry which made up the majority of their membership.

== History ==
The Ukrainian Women's Union (UWU) was founded in 1920 by Milena Rudnytska along with Olena Fedak-Sheparovych, Iryna Sichynska, Olha Tsipanovska and others, to organize women's journals, conferences, and cooperatives. It was said to have succeeded the Women's Hromada in Lviv. At the time, Ukrainians in the former province of Galicia, which had been part of the Austro-Hungarian Empire were under Polish rule. Though formed in what was technically Poland, the organization strove to unite all Ukrainian women who were not living in Soviet Ukraine. Unlike Western-style feminist organizations, the UWU was not primarily made up of elites, nor did it focus on attainment of political agency for women. Instead, the focus was on modernizing society through community initiatives and self-improvement programs. In 1921 the chair of the organisation became Maria Biletska In December 1921, the UWU hosted a formal congress to formalize its organization. Between 1921 and 1930, their goal was to establish economic and cultural structures which could be used to improve the quality of life of all Ukrainians and bring their nationalist cause to the attention of international organizations and by 1930 the union had between 50,000 and 100,000 members. Specific numbers are difficult to attain because Polish authorities at the time prohibited Ukrainians from consolidating their membership into one organization. Some 80 regional branches representing around 1,100 local organizations were formed. From 1931 to 1938, the goals turned more toward political feminism and economics rights-based advocacy.

Leadership of the group understood feminist principals, but they did not pursue a feminist agenda until they had increased their membership and initiated economic and social reforms to improve the lives of Ukrainian families. Many of the leaders were from women's clubs such as the temperance clubs and from the intelligentsia, such as teachers. Most of the membership was from the peasant class and the entire organization based its direction on work rather than theory. Leadership stressed the need for organized social activity to improve lives. The UWU carried out activities like sponsoring art cooperatives which encouraged peasants to create goods, and then collected their handicrafts, exhibited and sold them, fostering a market for their products.

Politically, the group served as a nationalist organ, encouraging political unity for the betterment of all Ukrainians. Because Ukrainian women lived in a non-sovereign state, it was imperative for them to forge their gender identity along the lines of national identity. The UWU of Lviv's leadership were actively involved with the Ukrainian National Democratic Alliance, an organization designed to coordinate Ukrainian political responses in Poland. Rudnytska, as a member of the Polish Sejm worked to overcome issues such as suppression of Ukrainian language schools. To bring the case of Ukrainian nationalism to the international arena, the UWU joined such organizations as the International Council of Women, the International Woman Suffrage Alliance and the Women's International League for Peace and Freedom. Speaking out against the 1932–1933 famine and Nazi antifeminist policies, the UWU attempted to expand women's spheres in the 1930s.

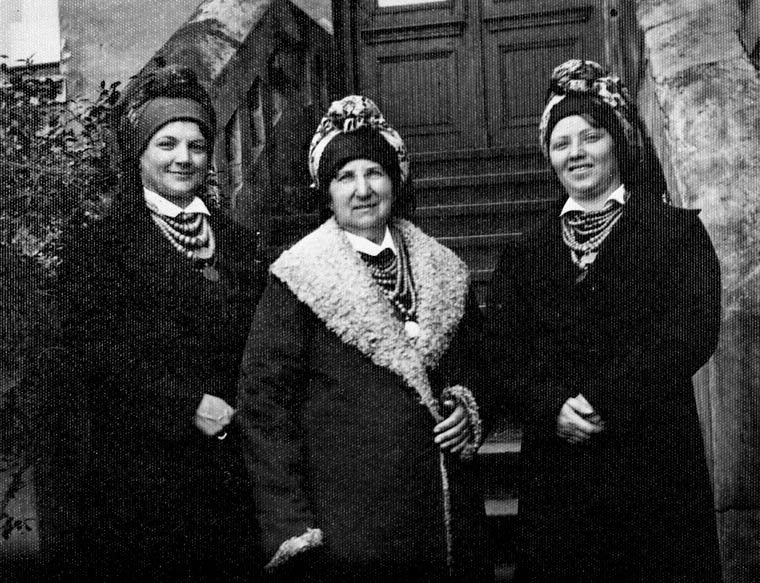
Delegates attending the Ukrainian Women's Congress, Stanislav, Galicia, 1934.jpg

In 1934, the UWU in Galicia hosted another congress, ostensively to bolster Ukrainian native culture. The four-day event was attended by around 10,000 delegates and the focus was on active participation of women and their importance in the community affairs of Ukrainian society. In 1935, the UWU founded a journal, Zhinka (Woman) which was edited by Shaparovych and which spoke on education, equality, economic opportunity and training, motherhood, and other women's issues. They also produce articles on exercise and nutrition and public involvement to encourage women to develop a modern sensibility of citizenship. Though the UWU was criticized by Catholic intellectuals, liberals and radicals, the organization managed to maintain its autonomy and the support of peasant population until the outbreak of World War II. On 5 May 1938, the Polish police arrested all of the leadership in all branches of the UWU, thus ending the operations of the most influential Ukrainian women's organization.

== Revival ==
In 1989 the "Ukrainian Union" reformed and resumed activities in Lviv, and expanded to Kyiv 1991 as the All-Ukrainian Women's Public Education Organization. The organization's charter states that it is the "... heir to the democratic traditions of the SU, which has been in force in Ukraine since 1917, was eliminated as a result of the Bolshevik occupation in 1939 and resumed operations in 1991."

Among those who revived the organization was Kateryna Stetsenko, Olena Suslova (human rights activist) , Halyna Datsyuk, Nadiya Samulak, Nadiya Kharchuk, Olha Horyn and Olena Zamostyan. When the organization was headed Lilia Hryhorovych, it lost feminist character and many of its participants and founders left the organization.

In January 2014, the Ukrainian Union entered the Committee of Women's Resistance.

In 2017, Ukrainian parliament formally commemorated the centenary of the 1917 founding of the "Union of Ukrainians."

== Notable members ==
- Mariia Biletska
- Ivanna Blazhkevych
- Sofia Fedak-Melnyk
- Katrya Hrynevycheva
- Olena Kysilevska
- Konstantyna Malytska
- Milena Rudnytska

== See also ==
- Ukrainian Women's Union (Kyiv)
- Women in Ukraine
