= 26th Artillery Brigade (Ukraine) =

Ukrainian Ground Forces unit

26th Artillery Brigade (2004 – present) 62nd Mechanized Brigade (2000 – 2004)
- 26-а артилерійська бригада імені генерал-полковника Романа Дашкевича
- Active: July 5, 2004 – present
- Country: Ukraine (from 1992)
- Branch: Ukrainian Ground Forces
- Type: Rocket and Artillery Forces
- Role: Artillery
- Size: Brigade
- Part of: Operational Command North: 16th Army Corps
- Garrison/HQ: Berdychiv, Zhytomyr Oblast
- Nickname: Major general Roman Dachkevitch Brigade
- Patron: Roman Dachkevitch
- Mottos: Ultima ratio (Latin); Last Resort
- Engagements: Russo-Ukrainian War: Battle of Bakhmut; Battle of Chasiv Yar
- Decorations: For Courage and Bravery
- Website: Official Facebook page

Commanders
- Current commander: Serhiy Marceniuk

Artillery operations of the Brigade

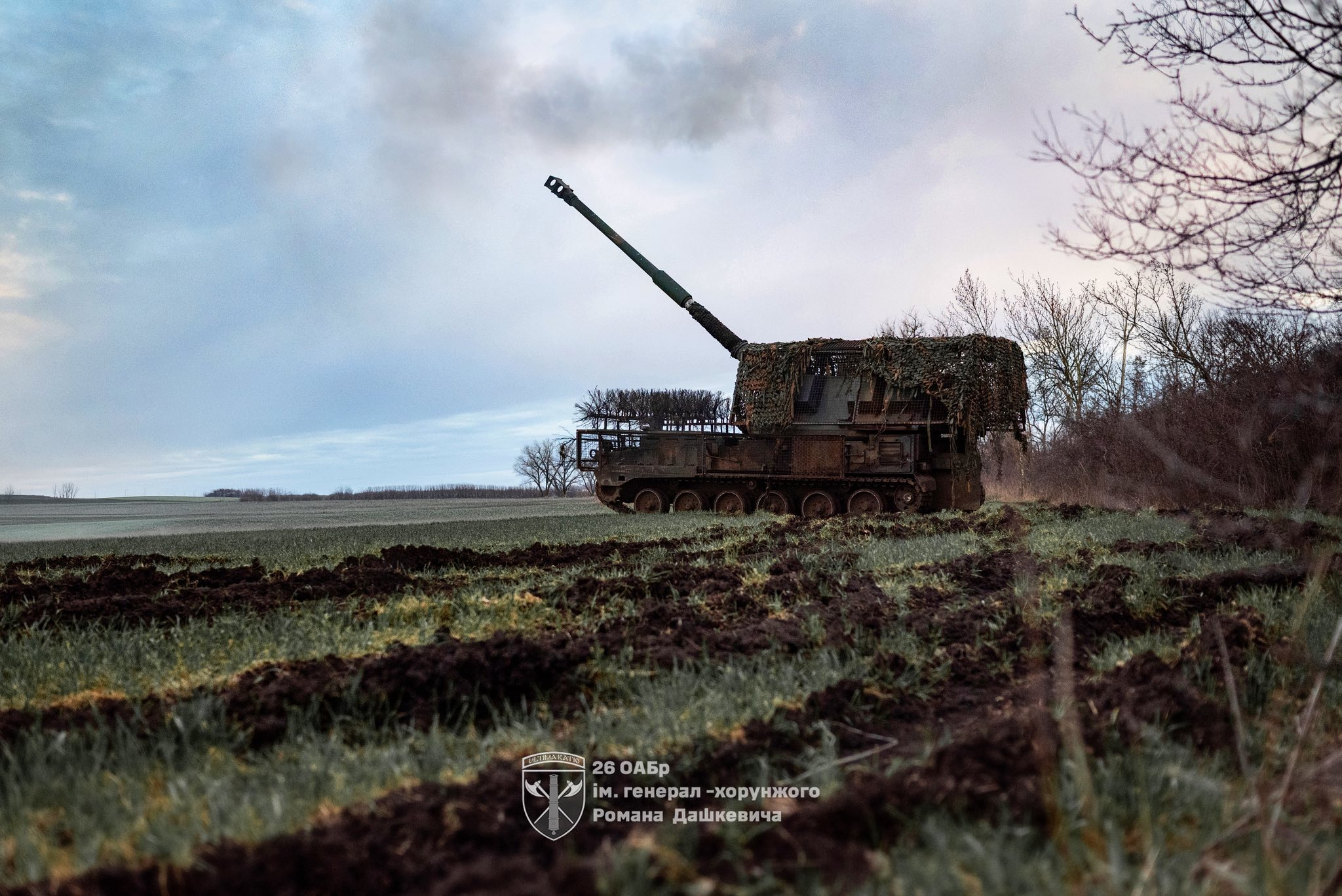
Krab of the Brigade in combat

The 26th Separate Artillery Brigade named after Major General Roman Dachkevitch (MUN A3091) is an artillery formation of the Ukrainian Ground Forces, based in Berdychiv. It traces its history to the 117th Guards Rifle Division of the Second World War.

== History ==
After the second world war, and several redesignations, the 117th Guards Rifle Division became the 117th Guards Tank Training Division. After the collapse of the Soviet Union, the 117th Guards Tank Training Division was succeeded by the 62nd Mechanized Brigade, which, in turn, was created 26th Artillery Brigade (based on the Directive of the Ministry of Defense of Ukraine from 18.06.2004 № 312/1/014).

In 1945, the 117th Guards Rifle Division became the 32nd Guards Mechanized Division. It moved to Berdichev and later became part of the 8th Mechanized Army.

On 4 June 1957, the division was converted into the 41st Guards Tank Division and the army became the 8th Tank Army. The 76th Separate Tank Training Battalion was disbanded in 1960. On 19 February 1962, the 685th Separate Missile Battalion and 437th Separate Equipment Maintenance and Recovery Battalion were activated.

On 11 January 1965, the division was renamed the 117th Guards Tank Division, restoring its World War II number. In 1968, the 129th Separate Guards Sapper Battalion became an engineer-sapper unit. On 1 November of that year, the division became a training tank division and was directly subordinated to the Carpathian Military District. On 1 September 1987, it became the 119th Guards District Training Center.

On 1 December 2000, the training center was disbanded, and its units used to form the 62nd Mechanized Brigade. In 2004, the brigade was converted into the 26th Artillery Brigade.

== Russo-Ukrainian War ==
In May 2019 the brigade was given the honorary title named after Major General Roman Dachkevitch in a decree of former President Petro Poroshenko.

The brigade is operating Panzerhaubitze 2000 self-propelled howitzers gifted by Germany and the Netherlands during the 2022 Russian invasion of Ukraine, artillery used in the Battle of Bakhmut.

The unit is active in the Russo-Ukrainian War and operates polish made AHS Krab.

On 22 May 2022 the unit was awarded the Presidential Award For Courage and Bravery by the PresidentVolodymyr Zelenskyy.

== Structure ==
As of 2017 the brigade's structure is as follows:

- 26th Artillery Brigade
  - Headquarters & Headquarters Battery
  - Target Acquisition Battery
  - Observer and FDC Battery
  - 1st Self-propelled Artillery Battalion (2S19 Msta-S)
  - 2nd Self-propelled Artillery Battalion (2S19 Msta-S)
  - 3rd Self-propelled Artillery Battalion (2S5 Giatsint-S)
  - 4th Anti-tank Artillery Battalion (MT-12 Rapira)
  - Artillery Reconnaissance Battalion
  - 14th Security Battalion "Cherkasy"
  - Combat Engineer Company
  - Maintenance Company
  - Logistic Company
  - CBRN-defense Platoon
