= Katrya Hrynevycheva =

Ukrainian writer and community leader

- Born: November 19, 1875; Winniki, Galicia, Austria-Hungary
- Died: December 25, 1947 (aged 72); Berchtesgaden, Germany
- Occupations: Teacher, writer, activist

Katrya Hrynevycheva (Ukrainian:Катря Гриневичева) (November 19, 1875 – December 25, 1947) was a Ukrainian writer and community leader.

== Biography ==
Katrya Hrynevycheva was born in Winniki, Galicia, Austro-Hungarian Empire (present-day Vynnyky, Ukraine) in 1875. Hrynevycheva was a teacher, married with three children. She wrote poetry and prose for various journals from 1893 with the support of Vasyl Stefanyk and Ivan Franko. From 1909 she was the editor of the children's magazine Dzvinok. After the end of the First World War Hrynevycheva worked for the newspaper Ukraïns’ke slovo. She wrote in Ukrainian and captured the folk vernacular as well as historical phrases in her works. Hrynevycheva wrote several collections of short stories and novelettes. Her biography was published in Toronto in 1968.

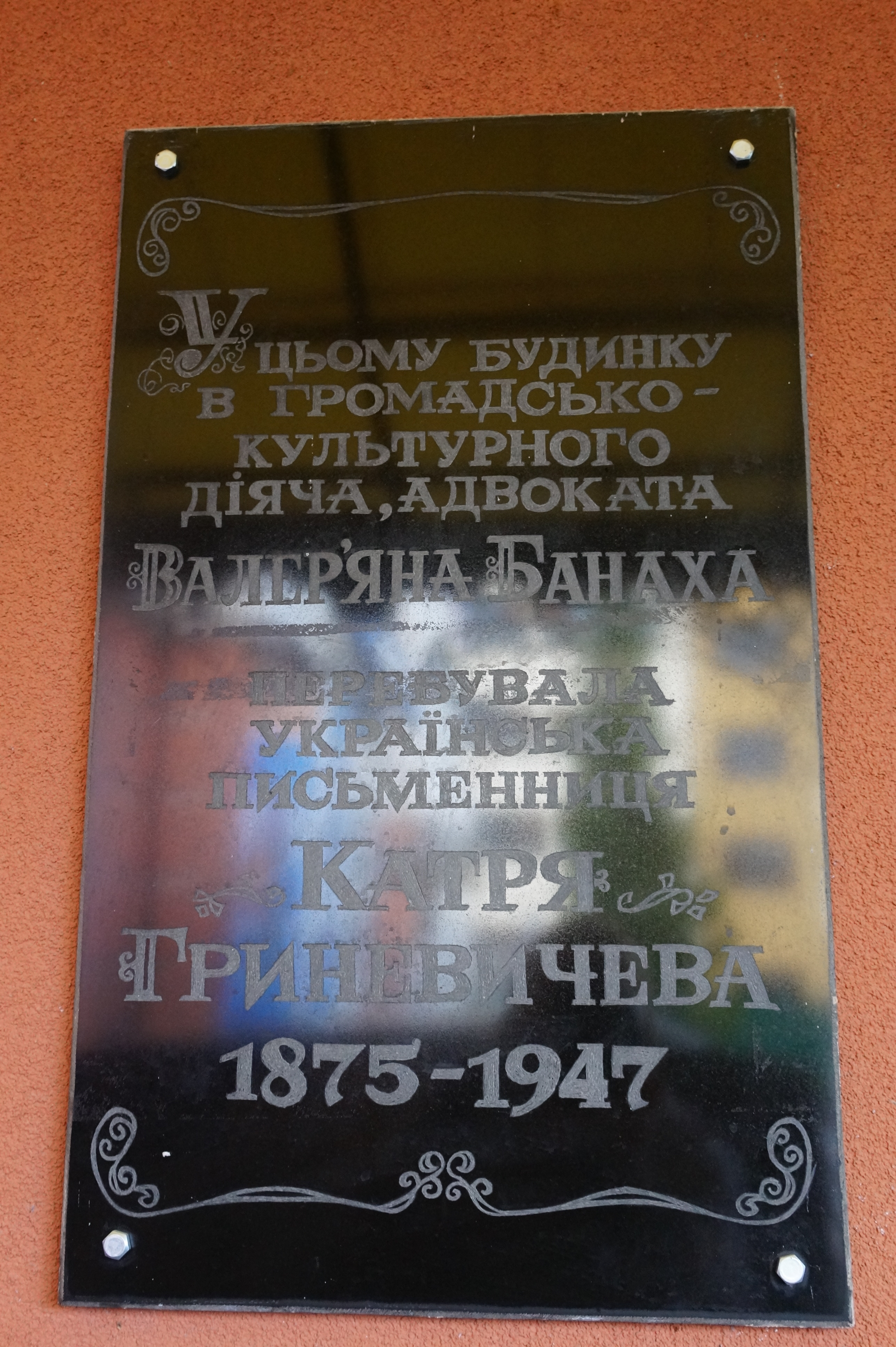
Outdoor Memorial Plaque for Katrya Hrynevycheva

Hrynevycheva worked as a teacher in the Austro-Hungarian Internment camps during the war and wrote for Vistnyk, the Herald of the Union for the Liberation of Ukraine. She was elected to the position of president of the Ukrainian Women's Union in 1922 in Galicia. Hrynevycheva died in Berchtesgaden, Germany in 1947.

== Works ==
- Legendy i opovidannia (Legends and Short Stories, 1902)
- Po dorozi v Sykhem (On the Way to Sychem, 1923)
- Nepoborni (The Invincible, 1926, about Galician internees)
- Sholomy v sontsi (Helmets in the Sun, 1924, 1929),
- Shestykrylets’ (The Six-Winged One, 1935, 1936).
