= Code letters =

Older method of identifying ships

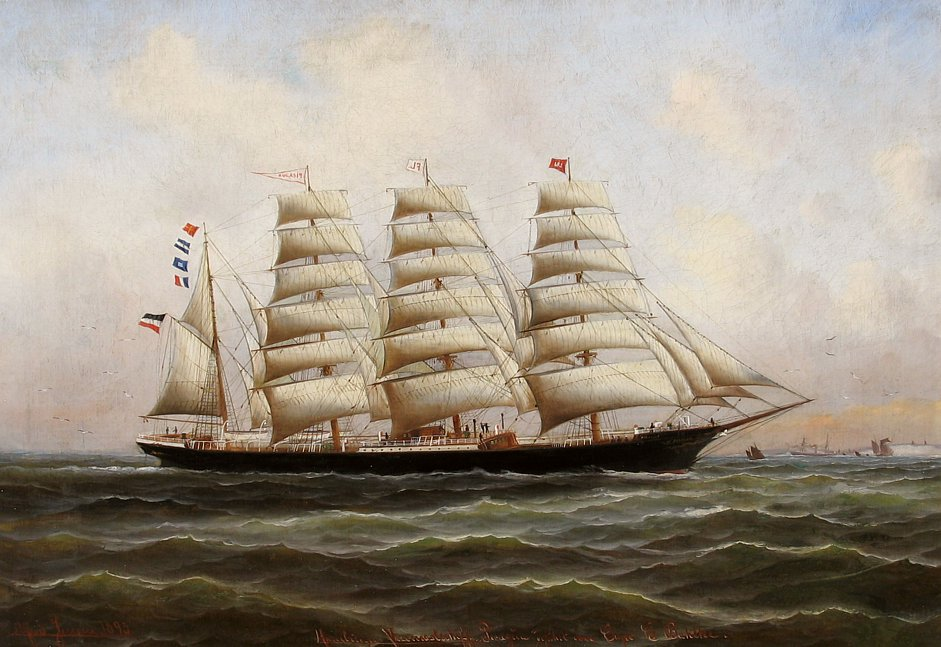
The barque Pisagua. Her code letters RJPT are flown on the jigger mast, above her ensign

Code letters or ship's call sign (or callsign) were a method of identifying ships before the introduction of modern navigation aids. Later, with the introduction of radio, code letters were also used as radio call signs.

== History ==
In 1857, the United Kingdom sponsored the Commercial Code of Signals for the Use of All Nations at Sea, which introduced four letter flag signal codes to identify individual ships. The first vessel to be reported in Lloyd's List by her letters was the Mallard (LDPN), off Deal, Kent whilst on a voyage from London to Calcutta, India. The Commercial Code of Signals, c. 1900, was modified to become the International Code of Signals. By the 1860s, individual ships were being allocated code letters in the United States and Europe. From 1874, code letters were recorded in Lloyd's Register as part of each individual vessel's entry in the register. Generally, code letters allocated to a ship remained with that ship, although there are known cases where new code letters have been allocated following a change of port of registry or owner. Code Letters were sometimes reallocated once a ship had been struck from the register, but no two ships bore the same code letters at the same time. With the introduction of radio for communications, code letters were used also as radio call signs.

== Flags used ==
Code letters used the twenty-six flags that represent the letters of the alphabet, plus the ten flags that represent the digits 0–9 also have been used. The substitute flags have not been used for call signs.

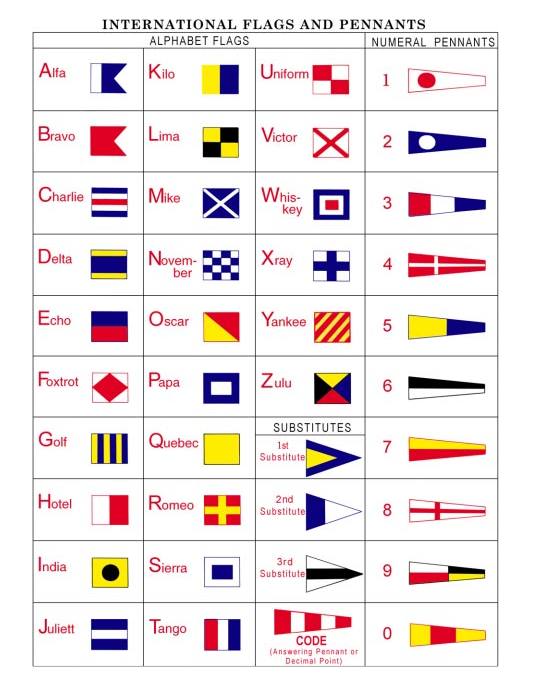

Each flag represents a character. If the ship's call sign is "3EJH2" (Panama Flag) the seamen would not say "Three E J H Two". Instead, they would say "Three Echo Juliet Hotel Two" to avoid misunderstanding as each country's seamen have their own pronunciation of letters and during speech over radio letters can be inaudible.

If the call sign has four characters, the first character (or figure) corresponds to the country code for the ship's flag state. If the call sign has five characters, the first two characters (or figure plus character) correspond to the country code for the ship's flag state. The variations of four or five characters, due to being limited to 36 characters (26 letters + 10 digits) are not enough for all countries. The Soviet Union used the first character "U" in its call signs: the cargo ship Metallurg Anosov had the call sign "USMW". If the ship changes her flag state, she must also change her call sign. For example, the ship Heinrich Arp: Code Letters "RDWL" (1923-34) were changed to Code Letters "DHKV" (1934-45) and from 1946 once more to a Soviet Union call sign. (unknown, but first character was "U").

An up-to-date edition of the book or computer's play-disk "List of Ship Stations and Maritime Mobile Service Identity Assignments", published by ITU, must be kept on board each sea-going ship. The book lists all sea-going ships and their call signs in accordance with Article 19, Section III of the ITU Radio Regulations.

Some canals or narrow places have special requirements for the vessels to hoist their call sign flags during the transit through the area. The Suez Canal was one such place with this requirement. Thanks to technological advances in the navigation abilities of marine craft, this action is no longer compulsory.
