= Mariia Biletska =

Ukrainian teacher

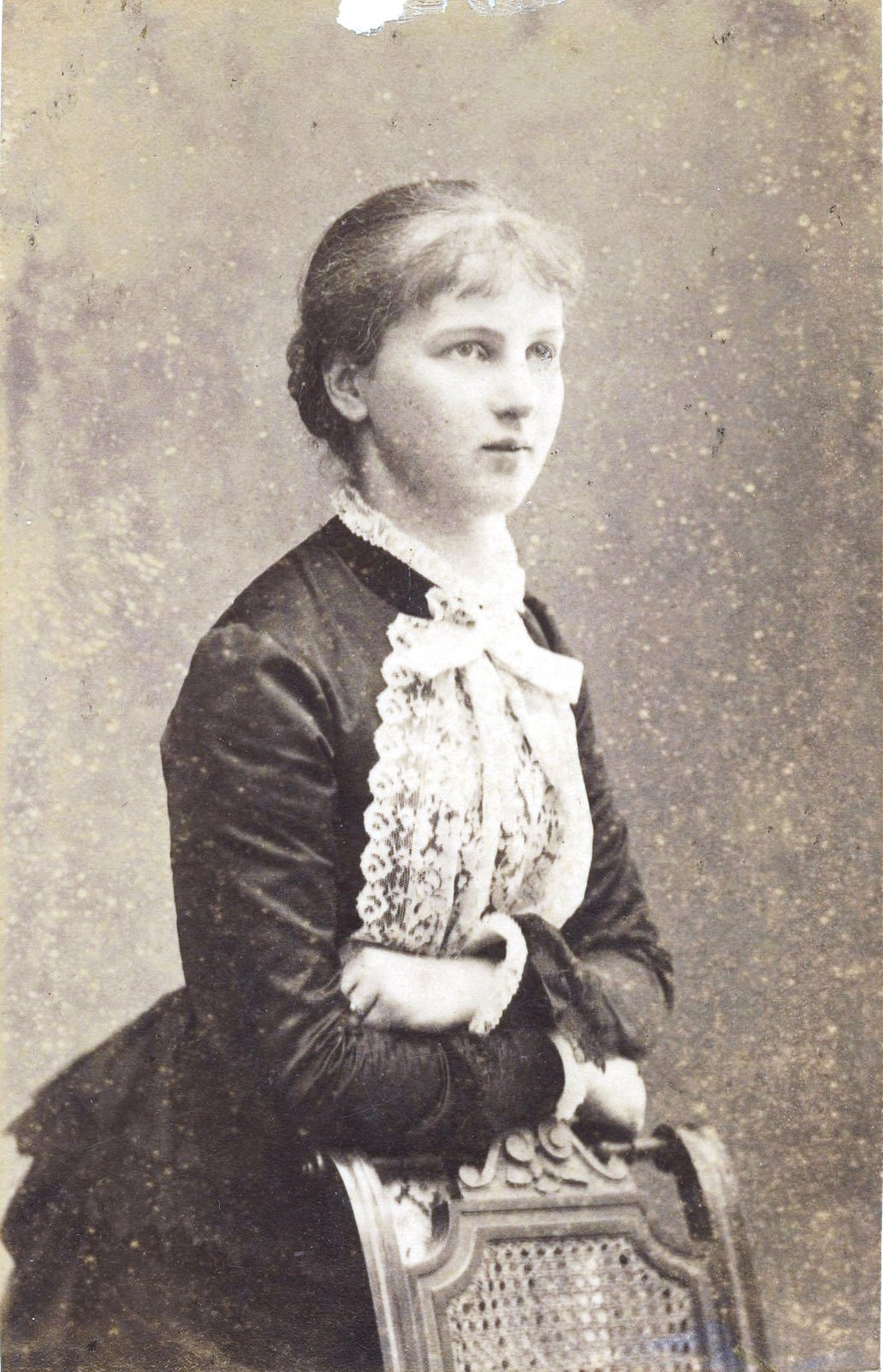
- Maria Biletska, c.1870-80
- Born: 1864; Ternopil
- Died: 30 December 1937 (aged 72–73); Lviv
- Known for: a leader of the Ukrainian women's movement

Mariia Biletska, sometimes Maria Biletska (1864 – 30 December 1937) was a Ukrainian teacher. She ran a house in Lviv, where students could stay. She was a leader of the women's movement.

== Life ==
Biletska was born in 1864 in Ternopil.

In 1899, she and Hermina Shukhevych ran the Institute of St. Olga. The institute provided a place for girls to live while they attended education in Lviv. About half of these girls came from peasant families.

In 1912 she attended a meeting organised by Konstantyna Malytska for the "Women's Committee" in Lviv to prepare for war. Others at the meeting were Olena Zalizniak (1886-1969), Olena Stepaniv and Olha Basarab. The money raised from the "National Combat Fund", they recommended, was used to fund the Ukrainian Sich Riflemen. Stepaniv would serve in that group as a rifleman.

She became the Chair of the Ukrainian Women's Union in 1921 for a year. The following year, she left the St Olga Institute. From 1925 to 1926 she was caring for people with disabilities.

Biletska died in Lviv in 1938.
