= SS Heinrich Arp =

Cargo ship built in 1923

History
- Name: Heinrich Arp (1923-45); Empire Connemara (1945-46); Liza Chaikina (1946- )
- Owner: H F C Arp Dampschiffs Reederei (1923-45); Ministry of War Transport (1945); Ministry of Transport (1945-46); Soviet Government (1946- )
- Operator: S Ollgaard & Thoersen (1923-45); Ministry of War Transport (1945); Ministry of Transport (1945-46); Soviet Government (1946-1963)
- Port of registry: (Weimar Republic) Hamburg (1923-33); (Nazi Germany) Hamburg (1933-45); (United Kingdom) London (1945-46); (Soviet Union) Vladivostok (1946- )
- Builder: Shipyard F Schichau GmbH
- Launched: 1923
- Completed: February, 1924
- Identification: Code Letters RDWL (1923-34); Code Letters DHKV (1934-45); Code Letters UKTO (1946-)
- Fate: Decommissioned late 1963

General characteristics
- Type: Cargo ship
- Tonnage: 1,428 GRT; 813 NRT
- Length: 237 ft 2 in (72.29 m)
- Beam: 37 ft 6 in (11.43 m)
- Draught: Maximum 17 ft 2 in (5.23 m); Light ship 6 ft 6.8 in (2.00 m)
- Depth: 18 ft 4.6 in (5.60 m)
- Installed power: Triple expansion steam engine
- Propulsion: Screw propeller
- Speed: 9.0 knots (16.7 km/h)

Heinrich Arp was a 1,428 GRT cargo ship that was built in 1923 by shipyard F Schichau, Elbling, Weimar Republic for German owners «Heinrich F C Arp» (S. Öllgaard & Thoersen), Hamburg. In May 1945, she was seized by the Allies at Hamburg, passed to the Ministry of War Transport (MoWT) and renamed Empire Connemara. In May 1946, she was transferred to the Soviet Union and renamed Liza Chaikina (Russian: Лиза Чайкина).

== Description ==
The ship was built in 1923 by F Schichau, Elbling.

The ship was 237 feet 2 inches (72.29 m) long, with a beam of 37 feet 6 inches (11.43 m). She had a depth of 16 feet 0 inches (4.88 m). The ship had a GRT of 1,428 and a NRT of 813.

The ship was propelled by a triple expansion steam engine, which had cylinders of 16 9/16 inches (42.1 cm), 27 5/8 inches (70 cm) and 42 9/16 inches (108.1 cm) diameter by 27 5/8 inches (70 cm) stroke. The engine was built by Schichau.

== History ==
=== German period of the ship (1924-1945). ===
Heinrich Arp was built for H F C Arp Dampschiffs Reederei, Hamburg. She was placed under the management of S Ollgaard & Thoersen, Hamburg. Her port of registry was Hamburg and the Code Letters RDWL were allocated.

Since 1933, the ship was registered in the German shipping company «Dampschiffs-Reederei, Heinrich F C Arp». In 1934, her Code Letters were changed to DHKV.

=== Allies period of the ship (1945-1946). ===
In May 1945, Heinrich Arp was seized by the Allies at Hamburg. She was passed to the MoWT and renamed Empire Connemara.

=== Soviet Union period of the ship (1946-1963). ===
==== Name change ====
The ship was in Clyde River when on 3 May 1946 she was transferred, as per repatriation, to the Soviet Union and renamed Liza Chaikina in honor of Soviet Union partisan Liza Chaikina.

German ships were redelivered from Great Britain to the Soviet Union in 1945 and 1946 as per the repatriation program, but only one ship was named in honor of Liza Chaikina, a woman who was not a very famous Soviet partisan. Liza is the Russian short name for Elizabeth. The family name Chaikina (Russian: Чайкина) translated to English is daughter of seagull due to on Russian "Чайка" is a seagull and last letters "ина" means a daughter. It was a Soviet Union reference to the future Queen Elizabeth II and it was also a code nickname for Russian Intelligence services. See the article about the Soviet movie Tamer of Tigers.

==== From Clyde River to new home port Kholmsk. ====
The ship was in port on the Clyde River in 1946 when she was transferred to the Soviet Union on the 3rd as per the terms of repatriation. The Soviet team of transfer took out the ship under new name Лиза Чайкина and finally destination port in the USSR should have been Odessa, Black Sea. During the voyage from Clyde River to Odessa the ship visited the following ports:

- from 20 to 25 May the ship stopped in Swansea;
- from 27 to 30 May the ship stopped in Plymouth;
- on 16 June the ship passed Istanbul, Bosphorus;
- arrived in Odessa in June, 1946.

In Odessa port the ship was sign on Sakhalin State Shipping Company, passed permanent repair, received bunker supply. In September 1946, Лиза Чайкина sailed from Odessa in September and visited following ports during the voyage:

- on 9 September 1946 the ship passed Bosphorus and Istanbul;
- from 15 to 18 September the ship passed Suez Canal;
- from 25 to 28 September the ship visited Aden;
- from 10 to 18 October the ship visited Colombo;
- from 27 to 29 October the ship visited Singapore;
- from 25 to 29 November 1946 the ship visited Hong Kong;
- the ship arrived in Vladivostok where she passed medium repair;
- the ship arrived in new home port Kholmsk as she was sign on Sakhalin State Sea Shipping Company.

==== The ceremony of the christening on the steamer Лиза Чайкина ====
One interesting story Christened regarding the steamer Лиза Чайкина was written by Sergei Vorobyov in Russian language as per story of "granddad", ex-crewmember of this ship. The part of more interesting text from this story is translated here:

Christened

(The story of "granddad")

I started my job in the Far East in 1940s. I was signed on the old riveted steamer «Лиза Чайкина». When I joined the ship I was young alumnus of the Nautical College and was signed off on the staff assistant stoker. Operations are simple and the same as "steamed turnip": it was necessary to feed the steam boiler with coal. During four hours you feed, eight hours in the rest. And, on the circle. Assistant task: to haul the coal to the furnace...

Once my shiftworker, such a healthy "ambal" from Kohtla-Järve, told me (as he was Estonian, he uttered the letters D, G, B, V, Ch as T, K, P, F, T respectively and sometimes lost R): — Pefore we entrust the "Montay" to you, you hafe to pe tristenet, frient. Ant it will pe, as in the sonk: "For a moment he saw a plintink likht, fell - the heat (heart) is not peatink any more."

As per jargon amongst the stokers, the "Monday" was a hefty scrap and not less than one pound of weight, which broke up slag in the furnace before cleaning the boiler. — So, I was christened, - I say - the grandmother told me that a poop christened me in the village when I was four years old.

And his partner immediately corrected: — So, you was christened in the Orthodox faith to be believe in Christ. And here christen in Steamship faith. That you will believe in the power of steam else. It is tradition. Without it you will not survive here. Steam will pull all the juices from you. In short, come tomorrow in the engine room after the daily watch. There all "the clear" will gather in full team.

That he meant the whole engine team of the glorious ship «Лиза Чайкина».

Next day, just after the watch, I climbed down in engine room and there all my "oily belly buttons" brethren headed by "grand-dad", I means the chief engineer, and waiting. Standing grandly and important. "Grand-dad" wore a tunic with wide chevrons on the sleeves for the solemnity even. And, in hand of the second engineer I observed a big white enamel mug, which was filled with not the water, not the alcohol to the brim. But I did not know details of the christening. I was thinking, if it is alcohol, - the trumped deal, due to I did not drink alcohol also and could normally stand on my feet after the watch. The "grand-dad" came solemnly and shouted in my ear as it was noisy in the engine room due to motors run. However, the diesel engine is more noisy now. So, he shouts to me:

— Shura, we are now intend to christen you as per maritime tradition and then you will our spirit man, and no any contagion or trouble will not overtake you easy. For this reason we need to make two sacraments, or possible to say — to perform only two conditions: to kiss a crank bearing of the main engine and then drink a cup of seawater. Are you ready?

— Ready - I reply. And, thank God, I will hope if it is not alcohol.

Regarding crank bearing should be discussed separately. The fact that steam engines connecting rods attached to the pistons, located outside, rather than inside as in modern engines, and they go into the cycle of the piston not reciprocates only, that is up and down, but also too much sweeping to the sides that you have look to avoid its "elbow" does not hurt you if you stand close. The crank bearing is in the lower joint of the elbow and this bearing needs to be lubricated constantly with the machine oil using the oilcans. It is required the highest category skill as a funnel for the pouring was on the rod, which is hopping a dance of death. And a oilcaner, so a motorman was called in that years, was involved unwittingly into the rhythm of this pagan dance, it was independs if he like it or not. And, oilcaner was crouching and twisting when he began to follow movement of the connecting rod, and at the right time he injected the right portion of the oil using big oilcan with a large down-curved nose (outlet pipe). One wrong move, - the oilcan could be struck by the connecting rod and the entire portion of the lubricant will be on your head. So motormen and engineers were unsurpassed dancers in this sense. They were virtuosos of the deal. It is marvel if you look at them from the side. The boogie-woogie is a pathetic parody regarding what they were doing. It is possible to say that their watch passed in the rhythm of this macabre ritual dance with the accompaniment of the romped monster. And an engineer contrives to determine the temperature of a crank some times during the watch also, thus he was controlling its possible overheating. He did it using own palm. A flat of the hand could safely withstand the temperature 70 degrees. And if the temperature is higher, then it begins to burn...

Then I did not know all subtleties, but I felt that I encountered the situation. This bearing was dangerous to catch by hand, but here it was necessary to touch by the lips. I took the position. All engine valetry surrounded me, the second engineer was closest and indicate the direction me by the mug to the crank bearing in front of me. I thought: "How long will I fit in? This crank will hits my teeth with the star effects exactly". I stretched my lips out in the form of a pipe as far as possible and began to approach the "killer". And right now, unfortunately, swayed to the left side, well, and I suddenly kissed the iron elbow so much that my eyes darkened. I woke from a stupor, and immediately the mug was served to me. I swallowed a little water with salt, my eyes climbed up on my forehead, and it burns in my mouth. It turns out, that my two upper teeth had been knocked out and hurt, became painfully due to salt. I wanted to howl. So it turned out, that I did not know who kissed whom - or I kissed the crank bearing or the crank bearing kissed me. But I survived it fully. More finally my forehead was anointed with axle-grease and said to me:

— Well, now you're christened as per all rules, and no any adversities will be able to hurt you. We accept you into our brotherhood of steam, coal and axle-grease, and, be healthy.

And, indeed, after the christening my second breath opened, and the power came from nowhere. I was not tired as before, and was able to beat off and split the outgrowths of slag to pieces by the "monday". I was accustomed to the heat conditions after a week, I did not want to get out from the boiler room. And the fact, that I was christened second time - apparently, this is not in vain, because during my second voyage such situation happened that only a miracle was able to save me.

==== The loss of the screw at sea ====
The same story Christened informs about the loss of the screw during the second voyage of the author on the steamer Лиза Чайкина at sea:

We passed with cargo copra from Bangkok to Yokohama. And farther our route lay to Nakhodka for the overhaul of screw-steering group. For this voyage I changed one "oily belly button" who was signed off for vacation and now I was sign on in rank a motorman of engine room...

Just before entering the Japanese port of Yokohama the sea swell broke out in earnest. Our steamer spanked on the water, like a spoon for the soup. Screw became increasingly denude often on the sea swell and then our compound engine begins to choke on the critical revolutions due to lost the load. The connecting rods had not run to the rhythm of tango more, and fought off the deadly tap dance...

Later understood that we had lost a screw during the second voyage. Well, the engine felt freedom and went galloping...

And a tow boat pulled us in Yokohama. There we have repaired.

==== Лиза Чайкина in Kamchatka-Chukchi State Shipping Company. ====
On 22 March 1949. Glavdalflot issued an order "About measures to organize the Kamchatka-Chukchi Shipping Company and Sovgavan port allocation from structure of Vladivostok port", which included the organization of the Kamchatka-Chukchi Sea Shipping Company in Petropavlovsk-Kamchatsky on 1 May 1949. The Kamchatka-Chukchi State Sea Shipping Company (KChGSCo) was organized on 17 May 1949.

The peaceful atmosphere contributed to the rapid development of the northern regions of the Far East coast. There were new industrial enterprises, developing the old enterprises, residential building was carried out. Population growth in these areas require more intensive delivery of goods supply and expansion of local transportation. In connection with the situation in the spring of 1949, management has made the decision on creation of the Kamchatka-Chukotka Shipping Company. For the practical solution of this problem Glavdalflot created a task force. Following ships were given to new Shipping Company: "Yakutia" (Russian: Якутия), "Sheksna" (Russian: Шексна), "Liza Chaikin" (Russian: Лиза Чайкина), "Alexander Pushkin" (Russian: Адександр Пушкин). Following ships were transferred from the Far Eastern Shipping Company: "Bukhara" Far (Russian: Бухара) and "Krasnoye Znamya" (Russian: Красное Знамя), and in October the ship "Khabarovsk" (Russian: Хабаровск). F.A. Matyushov was appointed as the head (the leader) of the Kamchatka-Chukotka Shipping Company.

On 28 May 1949. The ship was transferred from Sakhalin State Sea Shipping Company to the balance of Kamchatka-Chukchi State Sea Shipping Company. Home port became Petropavlovsk-Kamchatsky. The ship immediately was placed in Petropavlovsk repair yard for the repair. The Kamchatka-Chukchi State Sea Shipping Company put the steamer Лиза Чайкина into operations on 1 June 1949.

The ships of the Kamchatka-Chukchi State Sea Shipping Company commenced voyages in June 1949. On 31 May, the head of the Glavdalflot Mr I. Korobtsov approved the schedule of the ship's voyages. According to the schedule, following ships had to sail with 17,600 tons of food, manufactured goods and salt from Petropavlovsk to the Western and Eastern Kamchatka: "Alexander Pushkin", "Sheksna", "Liza Chaikin", "Bukhara" and "Yakutsk". Overall, in 1949 the ships of Kamchatka-Chukchi State Sea Shipping Company had following plan of trucking industry: "Yakutsk" - 28,000 tons, "Bukhara" - 23,000 tons, "Alexander Pushkin" - 14,000 tons, "Sheksna" and "Red Flag" - for of 12,000 tons, "Liza Chaikin" - 8,000 tons, "Lyubov Shevtsova." - 3,000 tons. If the total lifting capacity of this fleet was 18,140 tons, this fleet had to recycle 100,000 tons before the end of the year. In the fourth quarter of the year the ship "Khabarovsk" was added to this fleet, which had cargo capacity 2,000 tons and the task of which is determined in the amount of 5,000 tons.

Petropavlovsk repair shipyard completed the current repair (maintenance) of the steamer Лиза Чайкмна on 3 October 1949. But it was decided that the ship was put into operation on 1 October 1949. In October, The steamer commenced maiden voyage after repair and was carrying cargo for fishermen. Most of the crewmembers were newcomers and came out at sea for the first time. On the first day the ship entered the gale which did not stop for a few days. The waves flooded the deck, parted the tackle, but the people did not leave their posts. Steering gear was damaged during the storm. The team repaired it immediately and underway. Also other deffects of other mechanisms were mended underway. When the northern areas received supply, the ship went to Ossorsk and Ukinsk combines, where they met a heavy solid ice. Successfully overcoming it, the ship arrived at the scheduled points timely. The annual plan of 1949 year was completed by this voyage anticipatorily. The best crew members received commendation due to excellent voyage management.

On 27 May 1950. The head of the Shipping Company issued order number 81 "About the organization of the cargo lines..." in which was mentioned that the steamers Komsomolets, Lisa Chaikina and motor-ships Lyubov Shevtsova, Korsakov, Nevelsk had to be used on the line Petropavlovsk - West and East Kamchatka to organize the delivery of the industrial and food goods and the coming-out of fishing production. During the navigation in 1950 year the steamer Лиза Чайкина was used on the Petropavlovsk - Eastern Kamchatka cargo line. The ship was converted to economic accounting on 1 August 1950. However, during one of the voyages along the coast on 5 August 1950 the steamer used coal almost entirely, lost speed and maneuverability. By the end of 1950 the ship was in poor condition and was placed in Petropavlovsk shipyard for repairs. The ship was repaired in 175 days. And the quality of repair was low. By early October a new radio station SRKS-008 (Russian: СРКС-008) was installed on the steamer, but it is also required to be changed due to insufficient output for long-distance communication.

In a memorandum about the results of the shipping company, which was noted from the head of the Kamchatka-Chukchi State Sea Shipping Company to the head of the Glavdalflota in 1950, was mentioned that for the improvement of the Kamchatka-Chukchi State Sea Shipping Company operations in 1951, the steamer Лиза Чайкина should be removed from the management of the Kamchatka-Chukchi State Sea Shipping Company, which had prohibition from the Register to make voyages in areas Kamchatka-Chukotka coast due to ship's poor technical condition. But the ship continued to work.

In 1951, during the cargo check on the steamship "Lisa Chaikin" were missing six boxes of alcohol (spirit), 78 bottles and one metric center of confectionery. But there 34 "extra" bag of oats and 162 box of canned fish showed up.

On 31 December 1952. The Kamchatka-Chukchi State Sea Shipping Company had 29 ships and barges including the steamship Лиза Чайкина.

The ship Лиза Чайкина is absent in the list of the Kamchatka-Chukchi State Sea Shipping Company ships dated 31 December 1953. Seems the ship was transferred to other company before 31 December 1953.

==== The voyage in 1953. ====
Viktor Ponamoryev and Yevgeny Goncharevsky wrote the book "Notes of the recidivist", where was described the situation on the steamship Лиза Чайкина in 1953:

The Soviet Union leader Joseph Stalin died on 5 March 1953. There was 27 March, the most joyful day in the zone. The radio broadcast the call sign in the evening: "My native land is broad", and Levitan started to say, "Transmit the Decree of Supreme Soviet of the Soviet Union about amnesty up to five years ..." Zeks silent from the beginning, digested the information, it was not reached immediately the stupefied brains. But then they began to hug, jump on the plank-bed and shouted: "Amnesty! Go at home!.." The liberation commenced and only for the criminal element, but who had the 58th (here is about item of the law) - they were not amnestied. In the morning we, a large batch of zeks, were loaded on a ship and sent to Vladivostok. We were carried out in the holds and on the deck of the cargo ship Лиза Чайкина. What situation happened on the steamship, God forbid, it was nightmare. Day and night game under interest. The pairs sit on the deck, two knives stuck in the deck, the bank (money prize) is in the middle. Some persons lost up to the thread, removed own stuff and jumped overboard. Cargo ship captain had time to give the command only: — Stop engines! Man overboard! The sailors lower the boat into the water and begin to catch the zek. And some persons were specially thrown overboard, but they were dead already. First, slaughtered, and then throw out. These were not found anymore.

Arriver in Vladivostok. Zeks — like a sea, the arrived here from Magadan and other zones (prison areas). Consignments in trains and sent. After the zek's trains, the demobilized military passed as per downsizing of the armed forces...

The steamship Лиза Чайкина was not mentioned for the voyages of the Kamchatka-Chukchi State Sea Shipping Company in 1953 year. The ship was used for the zeks and demobilized military transportation in 1953. The Far East coast and Kamchatka Peninsula have plenty islands and continental places which are inaccessible from the inner continental lands. All these places and islands had prisons, prison camps and military settlements. It was necessary to use some ships for transportation of prisoners, military troops and supply which were separated from other shipping companies for the purpose of secrecy. For this reason "Dalstroy" was created by Soviet NKVD which had its own steamers for above mentioned transportations. According to the Resolution of the Council of Ministers of the Soviet Union number 832-370ss dated 18 March 1953, "due to the Ministry of Internal Affairs of the USSR dismissal from industrial and economic activity," the General Directorate of the Far North development "Dalstroy" was given away to the Ministry of Metallurgical Industry of the USSR, and its prison-camp units to the GULAG and Ministry of Justice of the USSR (except the Coastal Disciplinary-Labor camps, which was given away to the Prison governance of the Ministry of Internal Affairs of the USSR subjection). The steamship Лиза Чайкина is not mentioned in the list of the ships which was under control of "Dalstroy" and which was hired sometimes for the above-mentioned transportation.

It is means that mentioned in the book voyage of the steamship Лиза Чайкина was the first voyage of the ship for above mentioned transportations and it was after the abolition "Dalstroy". It is means also that Лиза Чайкина was not the ship of "Dalstroy" as some investigators suppose. But the same investigators write that the ship's of the abolished "Dalstroy" were subordinated to the Far East State Shipping Company.

==== The fate of the ship between 1954 and 1963 years. ====
During the mentioned period information about the ship Лиза Чайкина is not clear and needs to be confirmed.

One source mentioned that the ship Лиза Чайкина was transferred in the Far East Shipping Company in 1954. But another source mentioned that this ship was not registered in the Far East Shipping Company. Likely, the ship Лиза Чайкина was commissioned by the company or State which was subordinated to the Far East Shipping Company and was involved for secret voyages.

Will describe the situation during the mentioned period.

On 1 January 1955. The Kamchatka-Chukchi State Shipping Companies lost own independence and was subordinated to the Far Eastern Associated Shipping Company in order to "organize the work of the fleet in the Far East basin as per a coordinated schedule." The Far Eastern Associated Shipping Company was created on the base of the Far East State Shipping Company.

To improve the service of the developing economy in the Sakhalin and Kamchatka regions, the Sakhalin and Kamchatka-Chukchi Shipping Companies were separated from the Far Eastern Shipping Company and were subordinated directly to the Ministry of Marine Fleet as per MMF order dated 14 December 1957. From that moment the companies received names: Far East State Shipping Company, Sakhalin State Shipping Company and Kamchatka-Chukchi State Shipping Company.

On 6 January 1958, the Kamchatka-Chukchi State Shipping Company (KChGSCo) was renamed to the Kamchatka State Shipping Company (KGSCo).

The steamship Лиза Чайкина was decommissioned late 1963.

== Other ships with the same name. ==
- The motor tanker ship Лиза Чайкина was built in 1957 and was used by the Caspian Shipping Company. The ship was decommissioned in 1980.
- The tug boat Лиза Чайкина was built in Kherson Shipyard for the river port at Kiev in 1972.

== Photos of the ship ==
- The ship Лиза Чайкина during the repair in Vladivostok shipyard
