= Yelizaveta Chaikina =

Soviet Russian partisan (1918–1941)

Yelizaveta Chaykina
- Елизавета Чайкина
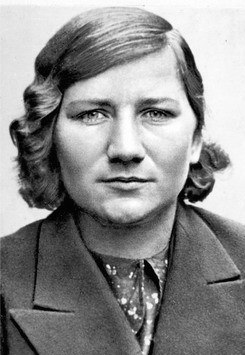
- Born: 28 August 1918; Runo, Tver Oblast, Russian SFSR
- Died: 23 November 1941 (aged 23); Peno, Penovsky District, Russian SFSR, Soviet Union
- Awards: Hero of the Soviet Union

Yelizaveta Ivanovna Chaikina (Russian: Елизавета Ивановна Чайкина; 28 August 1918 – 23 November 1941) often referred to as Liza Chaikina, was the Secretary of the Kalinin Komsomol Penovsky underground committee, a Soviet partisan detachment organizer and posthumous Heroine of the Soviet Union.

== Partisan activities ==
After joining the Communist Party of the Soviet Union in 1939 Chaikina was selected to be the secretary of the Penovsky Komsomol committee. In June 1941 she was sent to the Kalinin regional party courses before leading a partisan detachment beginning on 14 October 1941. Under her leadership, the partisan group took control of small settlements, raided Axis strongholds, and gathered military intelligence from reconnaissance missions.

On 22 November 1941, Liza Chaikina was sent to Peno with the purpose of discovering the size of the enemy garrison. On the way to Peno, she came to the farm "Krasnoye Pokatishche" to visit her friend, the intelligence officer Marusya Kuporova, where she was seen by the praepostor who informed the Germans. The Germans broke into Kuporova's house, shooting the Kuporova family members and taking Chaikina prisoner. Chaikina was subsequently taken to Peno. Even under torture, she refused to give information about the whereabouts of the guerrilla squad and was shot on 23 November 1941.

== Awards and recognition ==
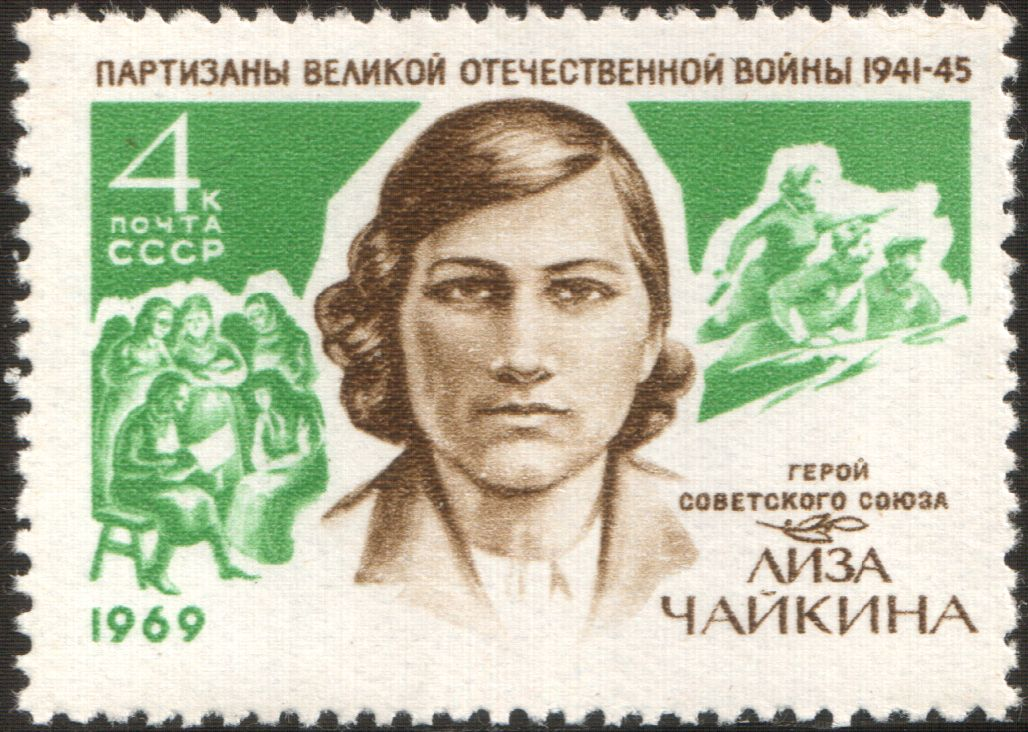
1969 Stamp featuring her portrait

Chaikina was posthumously declared a Hero of the Soviet Union on 6 March 1942 by decree of the Presidium of the Supreme Soviet.

The German ship Heinrich Arp was renamed the SS Liza Chaikina in 1947. Later other ships of the Soviet Union and Russia were named also named in her honor.

The 630th Guards Fighter Aviation Regiment of the Soviet Air Force named a squadron in her honor.

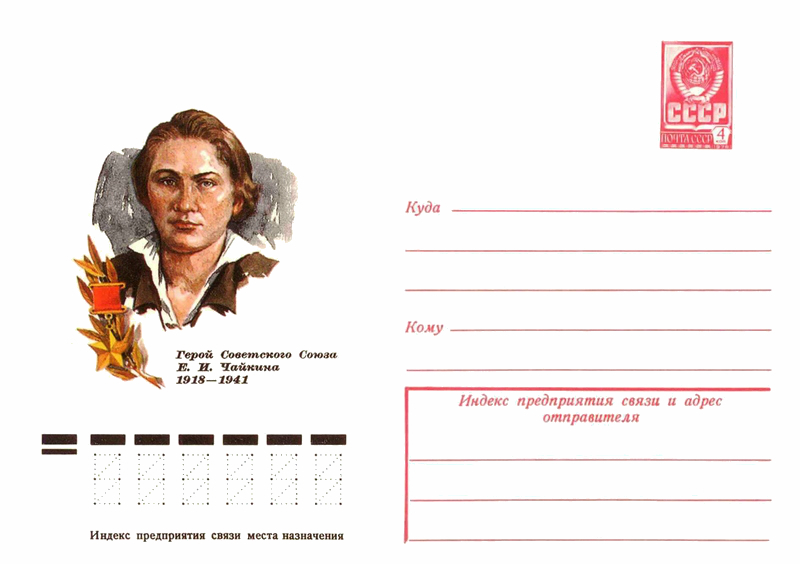
1978 Soviet envelope featuring Chaikina

In philately, her portrait was featured on a 1969 Soviet postage stamp and a 1978 envelope. (both pictured)

In October 2002 the Chaikina street in Ukraine's capital Kyiv was renamed to Olena Stepaniv street.

== See also ==
- List of Female Heroes of the Soviet Union
- Soviet partisans
