= Milena Rudnytska =

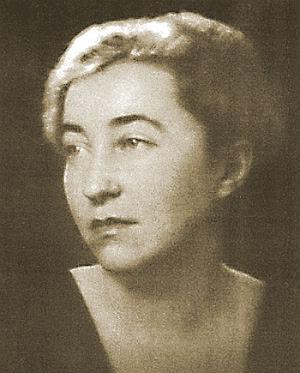
- Born: 15 July 1892; Zboriv, Galicia, Austro-Hungarian Empire
- Died: 29 March 1976 (aged 83); Munich, Germany
- Other name: Milena Rudnycka
- Occupations: educator, politician, women's activist, writer
- Years active: 1918-1971

Milena Ivanivna Rudnytska (Ukrainian: Мілена Іванівна Рудницька: 15 July 1892 – 29 March 1976) was a Ukrainian educator, women's activist, politician and writer. One of the most influential leaders in the interwar period of the Galician women's movement, she published articles in various periodicals. As a member of the Polish Sejm between 1928 and 1935, she brought issues of suppression by government authorities to the world stage, including the Polish regime's efforts to repress the culture of minority Ukrainians and the Soviet regime's denial of starvation in Ukraine during the Holodomor. With the Soviet and Nazi occupations of Ukraine, Rudnytska fled the country and remained an exile for the rest of her life, publishing books and articles as she moved throughout Europe and the United States.

== Early life ==
Milena Rudnytska was born on 15 July 1892 in Zboriv, Galicia in the Austro-Hungarian Empire to Olga (née Ida Spiegel) and Ivan Rudnytsky. The third child and only daughter in the family of intellectuals. Rudnytska's father descended from the Ukrainian gentry and after finishing a law degree at Lviv University, worked as a notary in western Ukraine. Her mother was from a Galician Jewish family of merchants. Their union had been opposed by both of their families and the couple delayed marrying for almost a decade, because one could not marry before age twenty-four without parental consent. When Ida left home, converted to Christianity and changed her name to Olga, the two finally married and subsequently had five children: Mykhailo (1889–1975), a philologist; Volodymyr (1891–1975), a lawyer; Milena; Ivan (1896–1995) a publicist and essayist; and Antin (1902–1975) composer and conductor of the Kyiv opera.

Rudnytska's family spoke Polish at home and her mother never gained proficiency in Ukrainian, though she raised her children as Ukrainian nationals. Close to her father, Rudnytska was profoundly affected by his death in 1906, which precipitated the family move to Lviv. She undertook her primary lessons at home, but then attended the Classical Gymnasium of Lviv and then in 1910 entered Lviv University to study philosophy, later graduating with a teaching degree in philosophy and mathematics. During World War I the family lived in Vienna, where Rudnytska studied at the University of Vienna until 1917 receiving a degree in pedagogy and though she began work on a doctoral program, she did not complete it.

== Career ==
Rudnytska began working as a journalist on the biweekly editorial Наша Мета ("Nasha Meta", "Our goal") in 1918. The following year, she married Pavlo Lysiak a lawyer politician who had also studied at Lviv and was living in Austria. By the end of the year, the couple had their only child, Ivan and their home quickly became a gathering place for leaders of the Ukrainian intellectual community living in Vienna. Back home in Galicia the Polish–Ukrainian War had resulted in a territorial transfer to the Polish state and adoption of policies to suppress minority populations. Though Rudnytska supported the Ukrainian national movement, she felt that women had been assigned inferior roles. She began to focus her attention on organizing women and involving them in raising the civic consciousness of a Ukrainian nation. Returning to Lviv in 1920, Rudnytska and her husband soon separated. Her son, raised among her family, subsequently adopted her surname as his own.

Rudnytska became one of the leading activists of the Ukrainian Women's Union (Ukrainian: Союз українок, Soyuz ukrainok), which she helped found in 1920 and along with other members of the leadership, including Olena Fedak Sheparovych, Iryna Sichynska, Olga Tsipanovska and others, organized women's journals, conferences, and cooperatives. Around the same time, in 1921 she began working in the Teacher's Seminary and later worked at the Higher Pedagogical Institute, both in Lviv, but in 1928, she stopped teaching and turned her focus entirely to social and political issues. Having joined the Ukrainian National Democratic Alliance, Rudnytska was elected to serve in the Polish Sejm in 1928 as a party representative, serving through 1935. That same year, she was elected as president of the Woman's Union and served in that capacity until 1939. Until 1939, she continued her journalistic endeavors as well publishing with several feminist journals like, Woman (Ukrainian: жінка, zhinka), Woman-citizen (Ukrainian: Громадянина, Hromadyanina), Ukrainian Woman (Ukrainian: Українка, Ukrainka) and edited the woman's page of the Ukrainian daily newspaper Action (Ukrainian: газета дію, hazeta diyu).

In Parliament, Rudnytska was a staunch advocate for Ukraine and criticized the Polish authorities for suppressing Ukrainian culture including their schools and religious institutions. Serving on committees for education and foreign affairs, she gave many speeches and was known as a charismatic orator. In 1931, she was one of three delegates from Ukraine to present the case against the Polish officials to the League of Nations, calling the suppression a "pacification campaign" to silence the Ukrainian minority population. She was also invited to speak on the issue at the British House Of Commons. During the 1932-1933 famine she was elected vice chair of the Public Rescue Committee, and organized meetings including politicians, scientists, and educators to address the issue and provide famine relief. Through her international ties with women's organizations, Rudnytska was selected to seek international aid support and bring the situation to the attention of the League of Nations.

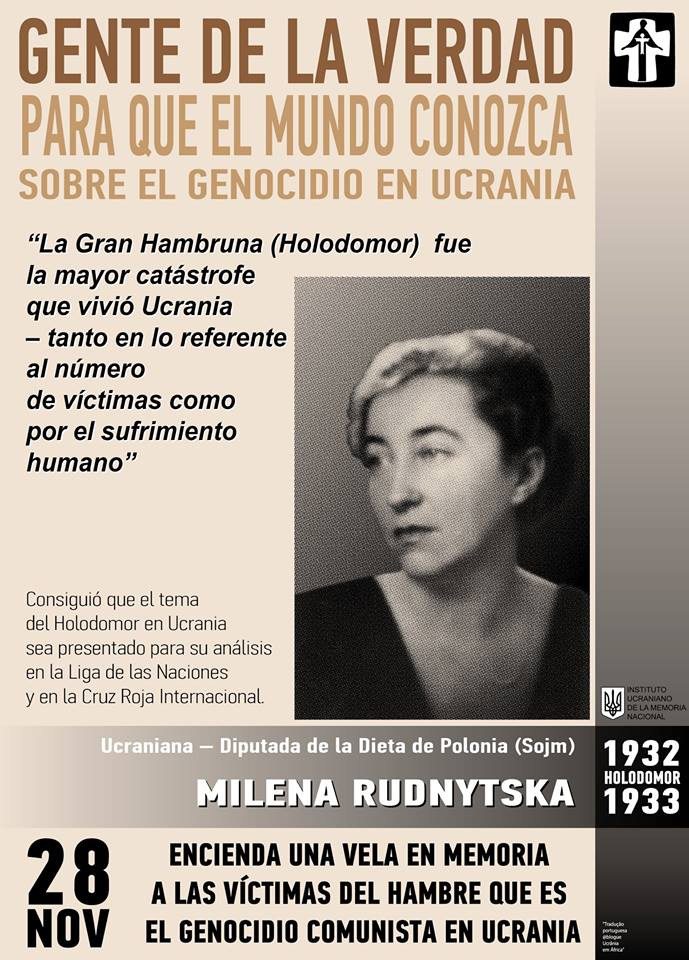
People of truth. There were those who spoke the truth about Holodomor. For the world to know. "The Great Famine (Holodomor) was the biggest catastrophe in Ukraine—both in terms of number of victims and human suffering" ~ Milena Rudnytska, 2015 remembrance of the Holodomor

On 29 September 1933, in Geneva 14 countries met and Rudnytska along with the other members of the Ukrainian delegation presented their findings about the famine and the need for international assistance. After several hours, the League decision was that the famine was an internal problem of the USSR, which was not a member of the League and therefore no help would be forthcoming. The delegation then appealed for help to the International Committee of the Red Cross (ICRC). ICRC officials contacted Soviet officials to gain approval for the Red Cross to organize international aid for Ukraine, but the head of the Soviet Red Crescent Society, Avel Yenukidze denied that there was any famine in Ukraine. Rudnytska spoke at another international conference held in Vienna in December 1933 urging that the international community pressure the Stalinist regime to admit there was a crisis and allow aid. Denial continued and information about the nature and scope of the famine was suppressed. In 1958, Rudnytska's book, Боротьба за правду про Великий Голод ("Borot'ba za pravdu pro Velikiy Holod, Fighting for the truth about the Great Famine) argued that the famine was a result of organized pressure by the Kremlin to "fracture Ukrainian peasants using collectivization to curb the rebellious Ukrainian people".

In the interwar period, Rudnytska was one of the strongest voices in the Ukrainian women's movement. When Hitler came to power in 1933, she evaluated the changes which almost immediately were made restricting women's lives. Laws passed by the Third Reich barred women from employment in the civil service, enacted quotas for the number of women who had access to higher education, refused women admittance to the legal profession, among other changes. In response to these actions, Rudnytska wrote a satirical article which appeared in the magazine Women's Voice characterizing the regime's view of women as monsters, who had no purpose other than to cook, clean and bear children. At a time when Ukrainian women had developed a premise that the ideal woman was one committed to political awareness and social enterprise, who made a conscious choice when or if motherhood should occur, the German view caused serious reservations and attempts to organize motherhood schools in German-occupied territories were resisted. Rudnytska helped organize the First Ukrainian Women's Congress in 1934 which was held in Stanyslaviv and then in 1937 was elected as president of the World Union of Ukrainian Women. During the late 1930s, the Polish government closely watched members of the Women's Union, arresting some of the leadership and trying to ban the organization entirely.

In 1939, during the Soviet invasion of Poland, the regime annexed Galicia forcing national-oriented activists to flee. Fearful of repressions by the Soviet regime Rudnytska moved to Nazi-occupied Kraków. Later, in 1940, she moved on to Berlin, where her son was finishing his studies, begun already in Lviv. In 1943, she arrived in Prague, where she published her book, Zakhidna Ukraina pid bolshevykamy (Western Ukraine under the Bolsheviks) in 1944. Continuing to write in exile, she moved to Berlin and then directed the Ukrainian Relief Committee in Geneva between 1945 and 1950. In 1950 moved to New York City, where she remained for eight years, before returning to Europe, first moving to Rome and finally settling in Munich. Some of her most known publications include: "Ukraïns’ka diisnist’ i zavdannia zhinochoho rukhu (The Ukrainian Reality and the Tasks of the Women's Movement, 1934), Don Bosko: Liudyna, pedahoh, sviatyi (Don Bosco: Man, Pedagogue, and Saint, 1963), and Nevydymi styhmaty (The Invisible Stigmata, 1971)".

== Death and legacy ==
Rudnytska died on 29 March 1976 in Munich and was buried on 2 April 1976 in the Ukrainian section of the Waldfriedhof Cemetery on Lorettoplatz in Munich. Her remains were reburied in Lviv in 1993 in the Lychakiv Cemetery, beside other family members. In 1994, Irene Martyniuk published a book, Milena Rudnytska and Ukrainian Feminism: The Art of the Possible, evaluating Rudnytska's role in the women's movement in Ukraine. In 1998, Мілена Рудницька. Статті. Листи, документи (Milena Rudnytska. Articles. Letters, documents) were edited by Martha Bohachevsky-Chomiak, Miroslava Dyadyuk and Jaroslaw Pelenski and published with the support of the Union of Ukrainian Americans.
