= Yaroslav Dashkevych =

Ukrainian historian and archaeographer (1926–2010)

- Ярослав Дашкевич
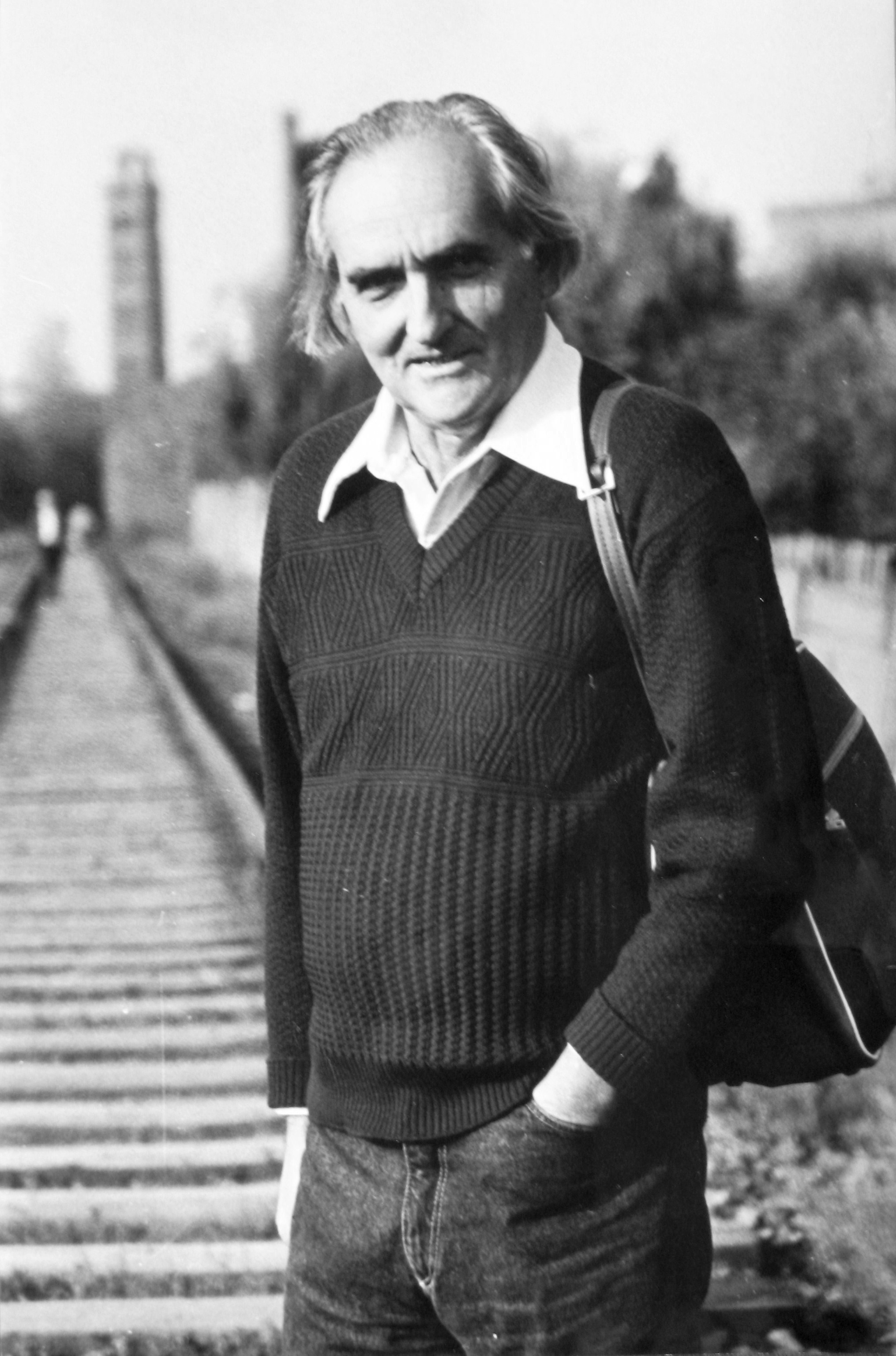
- Dashkevych in Lviv, late 1980s
- Born: Ярослав Іван Ананій Дашкевич; 13 December 1926; Lwów (now Lviv), Poland
- Died: 25 February 2010 (aged 83); Lviv, Ukraine
- Parent(s): Roman Dashkevych, Olena Stepaniv

Academic work
- Discipline: Landscape archaeology, Armenian studies, History of Ukraine

Yaroslav Ivan Romanovych Dashkevych (Ukrainian: Ярослав Романович Дашкевич; 1926–2010) was a Ukrainian historian, archaeographer and Armenologist. He wrote over 1,700 scholarly and publicist works. He was a representative of Hrushevsky's school of history, a victim of Stalinist terror, and a Doctor of Historical Sciences.

== Biography ==
Dashkevych was born on 13 December 1926 in Lviv to a family of war veterans. His father, Roman Dashkevych, was a lawyer, and later a general-khorunzhyi (general ensign) of the Ukrainian People's Army. His mother, Olena Stepaniv, was a teacher, and later chotar (captain) of the Ukrainian Galician Army. Both of his grandfathers were priests. On his father's side, he descended from the Korybut family, and his maternal grandmother belonged to the house of Gineyt-Kuncewicz. Yaroslav received his first name in honour of prince Yaroslav the Wise.

Dashkevych's father left the family and emigrated in 1939 following the Soviet invasion of Poland, and Yaroslav stayed with his mother and maternal grandmother. After graduating from Lviv Academic Gymnasium in 1944, Yaroslav Dashkevych studied at several institutes (Lviv Medical University, Lviv University, and Gubkin Russian State University of Oil and Gas) until 1949. During his studies at Lviv University, he worked as a librarian and bibliographer at the Stefanyk National Science Library.

In December 1949, Dashkevych was arrested by agents of the Soviet Ministry of State Security (MGB) on the accusation of possessing anti-Soviet literature and forged documents. His mother was also arrested soon thereafter. In 1950, Dashkevych was convicted to 10 years of imprisonment and served his time in a number of transitional jails in Lviv, Kharkiv, Petropavlovsk (today Petropavl in Kazakhstan) and in the correctional labor camps of Karabash, Spassk and Karaganda between 1949 and 1956.

After being freed in 1956, Dashkevych returned to Lviv and in 1957 was hired as a bibliographer to the Lviv Institute of Social Sciences of the Academy of Sciences of the Ukrainian SSR, where he worked until 1966. While working at the institute, he defended his candidate thesis on the subject "Armenian colonies in Ukraine in sources and literature of 15th – 19th centuries" in the Yerevan Institute of History of the Academy of Sciences of the Armenian SSR. From 1967 to 1972, Dashkevych worked as a senior research fellow at the Museum of Ethnography and Arts Industries of the Academy of Sciences of the Ukrainian SSR in Lviv. In 1973, he became a head of department of auxiliary historical disciplines. From 1974 to 1978, Dashkevych worked as a senior research fellow at the Central State Historical Archive of Ukraine in Lviv. He was unemployed from 1978 to 1990.

From 1990 to 1991, Dashkevych headed the Lviv branch of the Archaeographic Commission of the Academy of Sciences of the Ukrainian SSR, which later became the Hrushevsky Institute of Archaeography and Sources Studies of the National Academy of Sciences of Ukraine. Dashkevych was a head of the Commission of Eastern Studies of the Shevchenko Scientific Society from 1990 onwards, and since 1991, he was member of the Shevchenko Scientific Society presidium and head of the historical and philosophic section of the society. In 1991, he became a dean of the Lviv University department of Eastern Studies. In 1993, he became a leading research fellow of the Krymskyi Institute of Eastern Studies of the National Academy of Sciences of Ukraine. After Ukraine became independent, Dashkevych was able to return to studies of the history of Ukraine, concentrating on military history.

Yaroslav Dashkevych died on 25 February 2010 in Lviv and was buried with his parents at Lviv's Lychakiv Cemetery.

== Works ==
- Словник польських скорочень [Dictionary of Polish abbreviations]. Kyiv, 1959.
- Армянские колонии на Украине в источниках и литературе XV–XIX веков (Историографический очерк) [Armenian colonies in Ukraine in sources and literature of the 15th–19th centuries (Historical essay)]. Yerevan, 1962.
- Украинско-армянские связи в XVII веке: Сборник документов [Ukrainian–Armenian relations in the 17th century: Collection of documents]. Kyiv, 1969.
- "A Turkish Document in Ukrainian from the Mid-sixteenth Century: On the Origin of the Ukrainian Cossacks." Harvard Ukrainian Studies, 1977, vol. 1, no. 1.
- "Древняя Русь и Армения в общественно-политических связях XI–XIII вв. (Источники исследования темы)." In Древнейшие государства на территории СССР: Материалы и исследования (1982) [Ancient Rus and Armenia in social-political relations of the 11th–13th centuries (Sources for the study of the topic). In: The most ancient states on the territory of the USSR: Materials and research (1982)]. Moscow, 1984.
- "К средневековой сфрагистике армян Украины." In Banber Matenadarani (Вестник Матенадарана), vol. 15 [To the medieval sphragistics of Armenians in Ukraine. In: Banber Matenadarani (Matenadarani Herald)]. Yerevan, 1986.
- "Русь і Вірменія. Конфесійні та культурні контакти IX – першої половини XIII століть." [Rus and Armenia: Confessional and cultural contacts from the 9th to the first half of the 13th centuries]. Shevchenko Scientific Society Notes, 1993, vol. 225.
- Україна вчора і нині: Нариси, виступи, есе [Ukraine yesterday and today: overviews, speeches, and essays]. Kyiv, 1993.
- "Ясир з України (XV – перша половина XVII ст.) як історико-демографічна проблема." [Yesir in Ukraine (15th to the first half of the 17th century) as a historical and demographic problem]. Ukrainian Archaeographic Almanac: Nova seria, 1993, no. 2.
- "Русь і Сирія: взаємозв'язки VIII–XIV століть." [Rus and Syria: mutual relations of the 8th–14th centuries]. Shevchenko Scientific Society Notes, 1994, vol. 228.
- "Боротьба з Грушевським та його школою у Львівському університеті за радянських часів." In Михайло Грушевський і львівська історична школа: Матеріали конференції (Львів, 24–25 жовтня 1994 р.) [Struggle against Hrushevsky and his historical school at Lviv University during the Soviet period. In: Mykhailo Hrushevsky and the Lvivian historical school: Conference materials (Lviv, 24–25 October 1994)]. New York–Lviv, 1995.
- "Павло Тетеря, незрозумілий гетьман (1662–1665)." [Pavlo Teteria, obscure hetman (1662–1665)]. Neopalyma kupyna, 1995, no. 1–2.
- "Україна–Іспанія–Португалія у XVII ст.: контактні зв'язки." In Україна XVII ст. між Заходом і Сходом Європи: Матеріали 1-го Українсько-італійського симпозіуму (13–16 вересня 1994 р.) [Ukraine–Spain–Portugal in the 17th century: contact relations. In: Ukraine in the 17th century between Western and Eastern Europe: Materials of the 1st Ukrainian–Italian symposium (13–16 September 1994)]. Kyiv–Venice, 1996.
- "Постмодернізм та українська історична наука" [Postmodernism and Ukrainian historical science] Ukrayinski problemy, 1999, no. 1–2.
- Вірменія і Україна [Armenia and Ukraine (collection of scientific articles and reviews, 1954–1989)]. Lviv–New York, 2001.
- Dashkevych, Ya. "How Moscow hijacked the history of Kyivan Rus'." Universum, 2011. Online version; original available at Universum.
