= Roman Dachkevitch =

Ukrainian politician

Roman Dashkevych
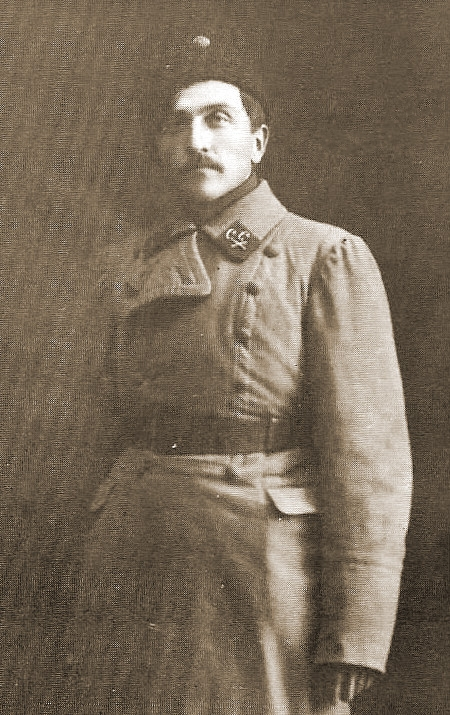
- Dashkevych in 1918
- Born: 6 December 1892 Lviv, Austro-Hungarian Empire
- Died: 11 January 1975 (aged 82) Kufstein, Austria
- Allegiance: Ukrainian People's Republic
- Branch: Artillery
- Conflicts: World War I, Russian Civil War, Ukrainian War of Independence

Roman-Mykola Dashkevych (Ukrainian: Роман-Микола Дашкевич, 6 December 1892 – 11 January 1975) was a Ukrainian politician and soldier, known for his role in the formation of the artillery of the Ukrainian People's Army.

== Biography ==
=== Early life and education ===
Roman-Mykola Dashkevych was born on 6 December 1892 to a noble family from the Korybut clan. His father Ivan Dashkevych served as a priest in the village of Tustanovychi near Drohobych, and his possessions included a number of oil wells, allowing him to provide Roman and his sisters a good education. He attended gymnasium in Peremyshl (now Przemyśl) and later studied law at Lviv University. During his student years, Roman became involved in the Ukrainian political movement in Galicia, and travelled on foot to visit the grave of Taras Shevchenko in Kaniv. With the financial support of his father, Roman organized a branch of the Sich society in Lviv, aiming to prepare local Ukrainian youth for the oncoming war using the freedom struggle of Ukrainian Cossacks as an inspiration. Sich succeeded in attracting into its rows not only members of the intelligentsia, but also suburban workers, which allowed it to attain a mass character.

=== Military career ===
At the outbreak of World War I, Dashkevych was mobilized into the Austro-Hungarian Army as an artillery sergeant. After being captured by the Russians, he began organizing among Ukrainian prisoners of war and encouraged them to support Ukrainian national causes.

Following the February Revolution of 1917, he escaped to Kyiv and became involved in the formation of the Sich Riflemen, composed of Ukrainian soldiers from Bukovina and Galicia. In mid-December 1917, he officially established the unit as part of the Army of Zaporizhzhia with 22 former Austro-Hungarian POWs. In February 1918, he was appointed commander of an artillery battery that defended Kyiv against advancing Soviet troops. Because of this role, he is regarded as the founder of the UNA's artillery forces.

=== Later life and death ===
Following the Soviet occupation of Lviv, Roman emigrated, while his wife and son stayed in Lviv. Dashkevych spent his later years in exile in Europe, expecting an imminent war against the Soviet Union. He died in Kufstein, Austria, in 1975 and was reburied in Lychakiv Cemetery, Lviv in 2006.

== Family ==
During his participation in the Ukrainian student movement, Roman Dashkevych met Olena Stepaniv, an activist of the Plast, who was only one day younger than him. Olena later served in the Ukrainian Sich Riflemen and was promoted to an officer's rank. Captured in one of the battles against the Russian army, between 1915 and 1917 she was imprisoned in the Russian Empire, before returning to Galicia. The couple married on 14 July 1920 in Vienna, where Olena studied to attain her PhD. In 1926 they had a son Yaroslav, who would become a notable Ukrainian historian.

== Legacy ==
Dashkevych is commemorated as one of the key figures in the early development of the Ukrainian military. His role in founding the artillery branch of the Sich Riflemen is particularly noted in modern Ukrainian military history.

After Ukraine regained its independence, a memorial plaque to Roman Dashkevych was installed in Lviv. The modern 26th Artillery Brigade of Ukraine is named in his honor.

== Gallery ==
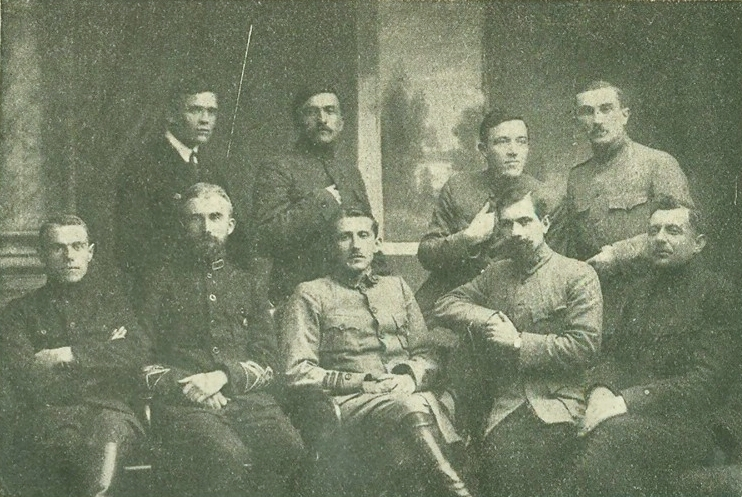
The staff of the Sich Riflemen around 1920 - seated left to right are Mykhailo Matchak, Andriy Melnyk, Yevhen Konovalets, Roman Sushko, Ivan Dankiv and standing left to right are Ivan Andrukh, Roman Dashkevych, Vasyl Kuchabskyi, Yaroslav Tchyj.

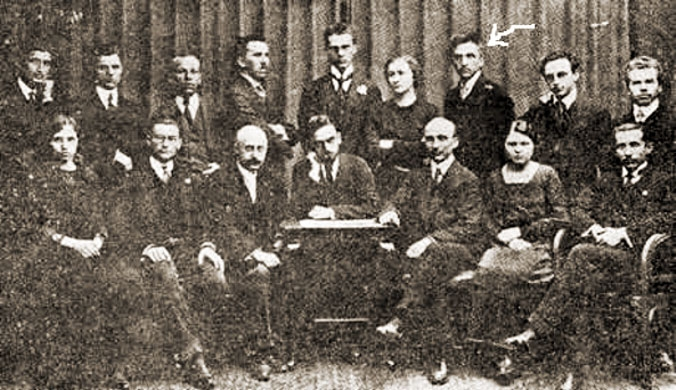
The staff of the Sich Riflemen around 1920. Seated (L–R): Mykhailo Matchak, Andriy Melnyk, Yevhen Konovalets, Roman Sushko, Ivan Dankiv. Standing (L–R): Ivan Andrukh, Roman Dashkevych, Vassyl Kuchabskyi, Yaroslav Tchyj.

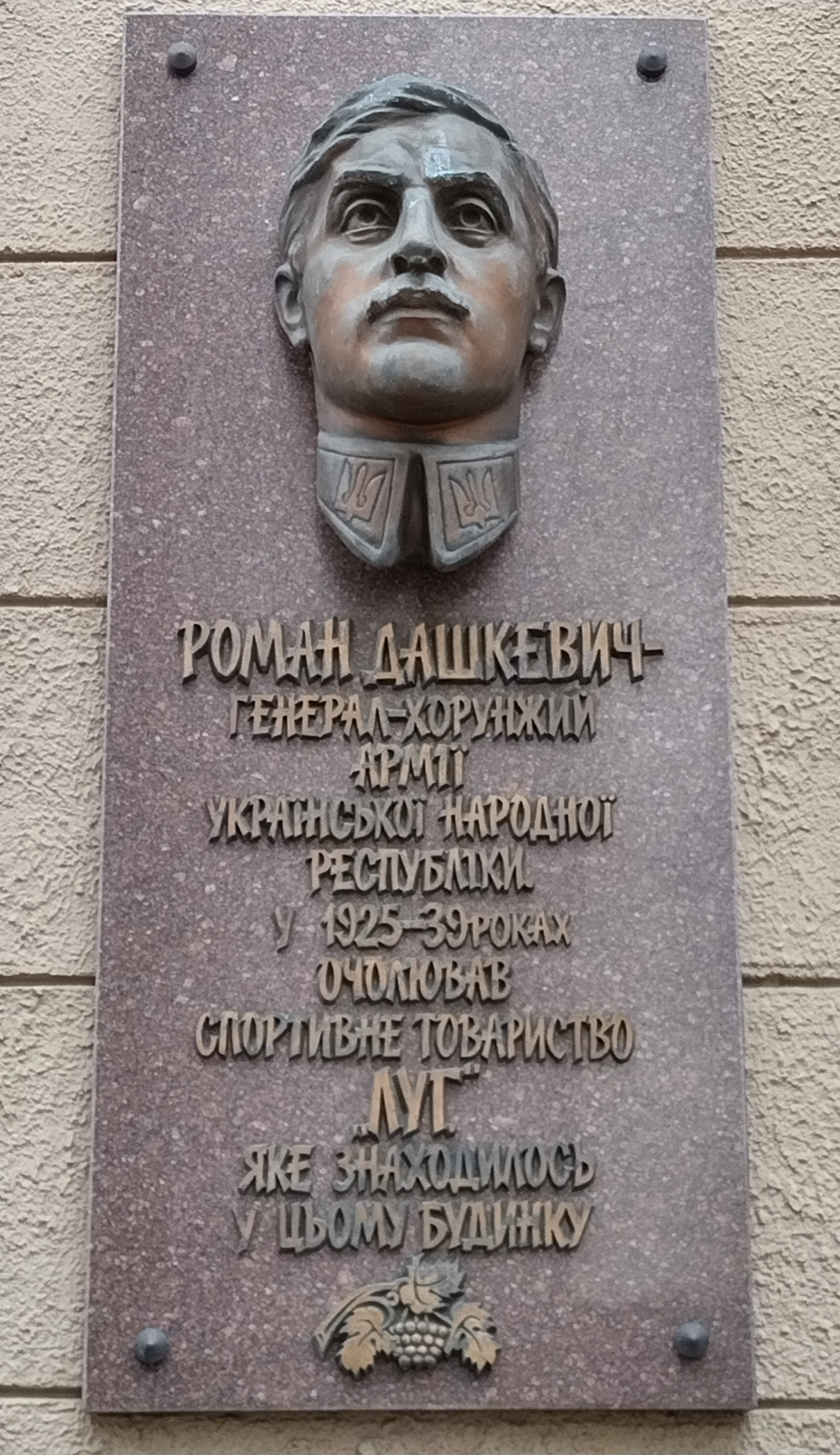
Memorial plaque at 5 Kopernyka Street in Lviv

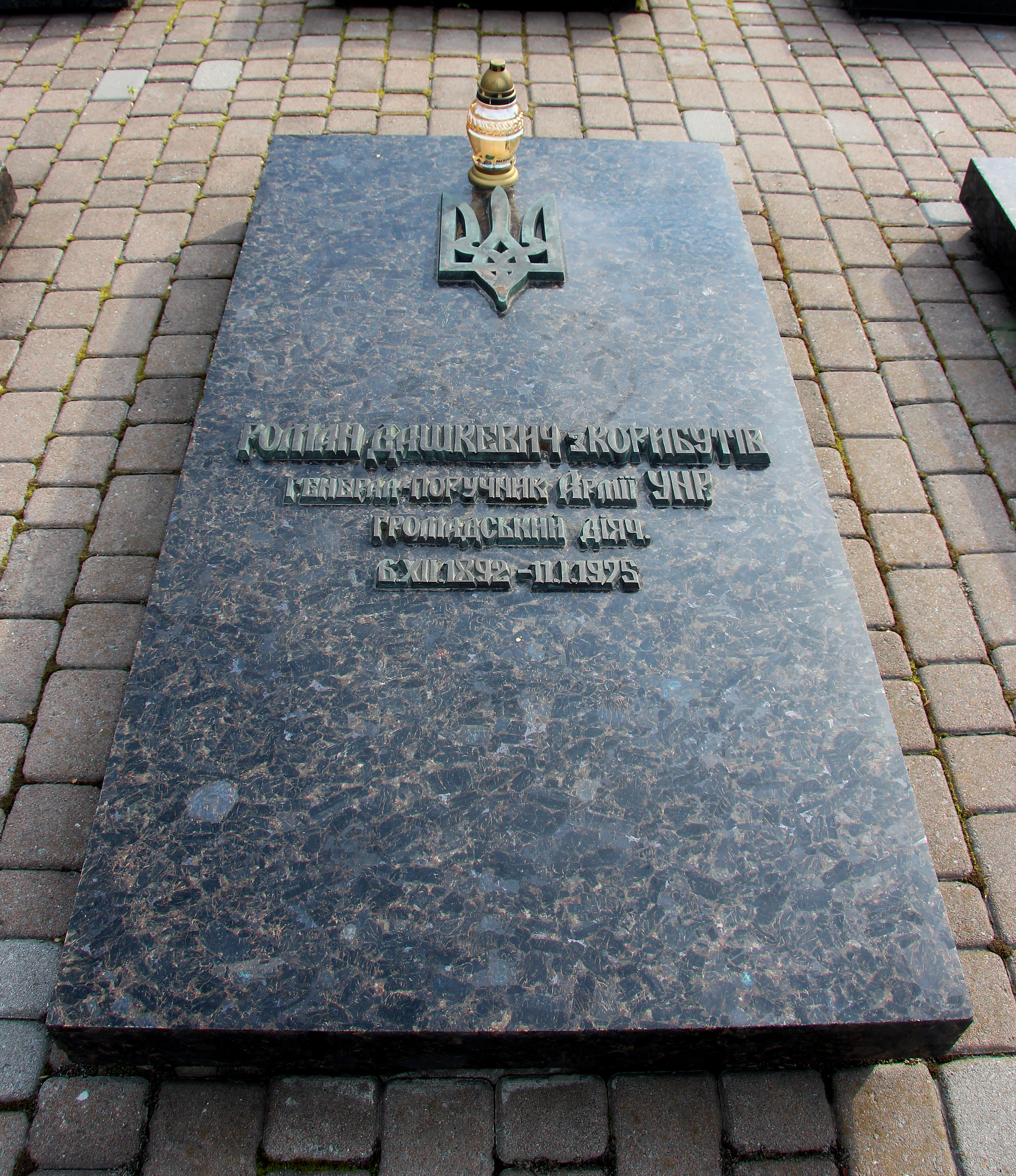
Grave of Roman Dashkevych in Field 67 of the Lychakiv Cemetery in Lviv
