= Olena Stepaniv =

Ukrainian military, public figure, and economist

- Олена Степанів
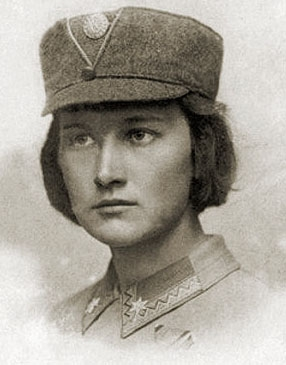
- Stepaniv in Ukrainian Sich Riflemen uniform
- Born: Олена-Марія Степанів; 7 December 1892; Vyshnivchyk, Kingdom of Galicia and Lodomeria, Austria-Hungary (now Lviv Raion, Lviv Oblast, Ukraine)
- Died: 11 July 1963 (aged 70); Lviv, Ukrainian SSR, Soviet Union
- Other names: Olena Iwaniwna Stepaniw; Olena Stepaniw-Dachkevitch
- Citizenship: Austria-Hungary; West Ukrainian People's Republic; Second Polish Republic; Soviet Union
- Education: Lviv University
- Occupations: Soldier, teacher, economist
- Known for: First female soldier of the Ukrainian Army
- Spouse: Roman Dashkevych
- Children: Yaroslav Dashkevych

Olena Ivanivna Stepaniv (Ukrainian: Оле́на Іванівна Степа́нів; 7 December 1892 – 11 July 1963; also known as Olena Stepanivna, Olena Iwaniwna Stepaniw or Olena Stepaniw-Dashkevych) was an Austro-Hungarian and Ukrainian soldier, public figure and economist. She is popularly known as the first female officer in the Ukrainian army.

== Life ==
=== Early years ===
Olena-Mariya Stepaniv was born on 7 December 1892 in Vyshnivchyk, Austria-Hungary (now Lviv Raion, Lviv Oblast, Ukraine) Olena's father Ivan Stepaniv served as the village priest, and his ancestors were said to have moved to the locality from Podillia fleeing religious persecution. Ivan was active in civic life of the Ukrainian community, promoting the creation of Prosvita reading halls and participating in the Sich, Sokil and Plast societies. Olena's mother Mariya-Mynodora descended from the noble Gineyt-Kuncewicz family.

Olena's elder brother Ananiy was active in sports, and Olena followed his steps, joining a Plast scouting group led by Ivan Chmola. Together with several other girl activists such as Olha Basarab, Stefaniya Pashkevych and Mariyka Bachynska, Olena formed an all-female squad of the Plast and became its head. In 1912, she attended a meeting organised by Konstantyna Malytska for the "Women's Committee" in Lviv to prepare for war. Others at the meeting were Olena Zalizniak, Mariia Biletska and Olha Basarab. They recommended that the money raised from the "National Combat Fund" be used to fund the Ukrainian Sich Riflemen.

=== Military service ===
During the First World War she was a student at Lviv University. While still a student she was given the command of a platoon. She claimed that she joined the Ukrainian Sich Riflemen by dressing as a man. Her disguise was spotted and it was debated as to whether she should be detained; she was saved when Volodymyr Starosolsky intervened and persuaded the recruiters to enroll her. Initially, Olena was mentioned in the legion's acts under the male name Oleh, but by the time of her first award in November 1914 her real name had become publicly known. It has been estimated that only 34 Ukrainian women made it to the front including Stepaniv and her friend Hanna Dmyterko. Some of the details of Olena's military service would change in her later retellings.

Stepaniv was present at the battle for Makivka with the Legion of Ukrainian Sich Riflemen and was rewarded by being promoted to second lieutenant and awarded a medal for bravery. In January 1915 an interview with Stepaniv was published by Neues Wiener Tagblatt, and she became the best-known female Ukrainian soldier. Women soldiers at the time were reported on internationally, and postcards of them were distributed, but it was Stepaniv who gained the greatest profile. Ferenc Molnár, a journalist and playwright, reported seeing female riflemen serving alongside men, wearing uniforms and gaining medals and promotions. Italian press of the time compared Olena to an Amazon, and her portraits became popular around Europe and even in America. According to one source, Stepaniv, Sofia Halechko and Iryna Kuz were the first women to fight on equal terms with men in the 20th century, but another source cites other examples.

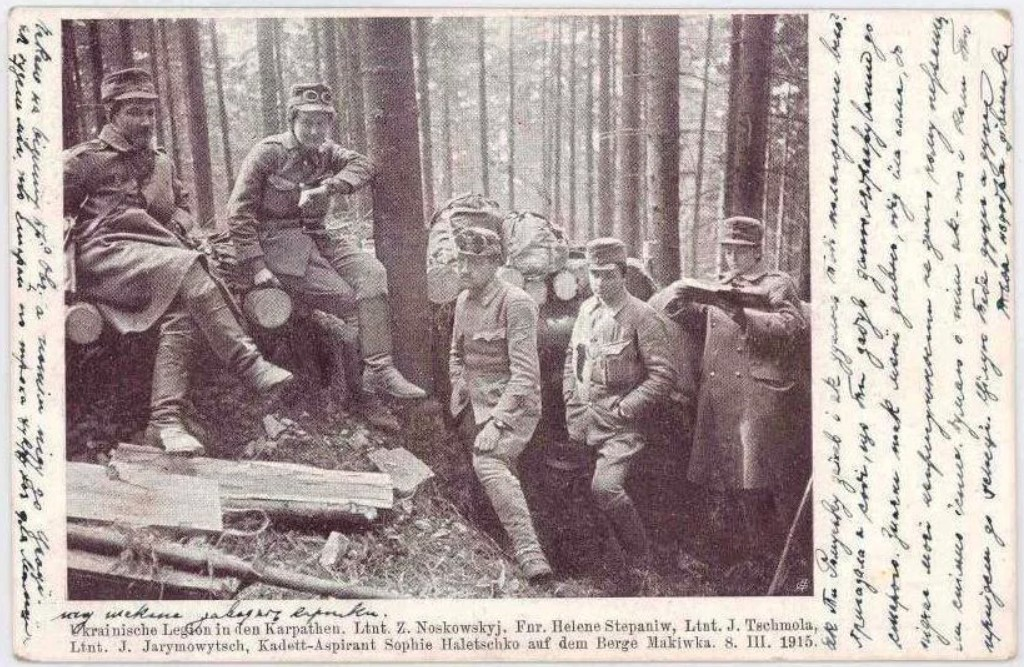
A used postcard showing USS officers Zenon Noskovskyi, Olena Stepaniv, Ivan Chmola, Osyp Yarymovych, and Sofia Halechko on Mount Makivka

On 30 May 1915, near Lisovychi Stepaniv was taken prisoner by the Russians after she, and others, stayed behind to cover a retreat at Bolekhiv. She was held in Tashkent as a prisoner of war until 1917. She helped organise the 1918 uprising in Tashkent, as a member of the legion's Supreme Military Board. Stepaniv's return to Galicia through Finland and Sweden in 1917 was widely publicized by the press, and she even became a hero of a number of Ukrainian folk songs. After her return she was awarded with Karl Troop Cross. In September 1918 photos of Stepaniv and other female Sich Riflemen were exhibited at the National Museum in Lviv, and a portrait of her (lost in 1952) was created by painter Osyp Kurylas. From 1918 to 1919 she again commanded a platoon, this time in the Ukrainian Galician Army, the military force of the West Ukrainian People's Republic. Her brother Ananiy, who also served in the Galician Army, fell in battle in 1919.

=== Postwar career ===
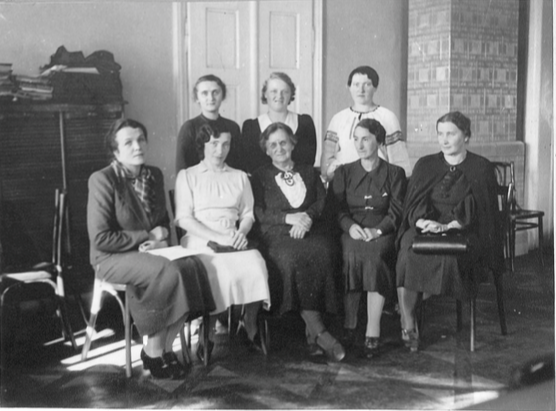
Stepaniv (seated right) with other activists of the Ukrainian cooperative movement, 1937

When the war was over, Stepaniv returned to education and in 1921 gained a doctorate at Vienna University. In 1927, she attended the 2nd Congress of Ukrainian natural scientists and physicians. In 1930, she published a book recording the years 1912–14. This was one of the 75 publications she made during her life.

Stepaniv began teaching at a gymnasium established by the Basilian sisters in Lviv; she remained there until 1935, when the Polish leaders of the order stopped her teaching. She then took a job with the Ridna Shkola society, which had championed the Ukrainian language since 1881. She also worked for the Audit Union of Ukrainian Co-operatives and was a well-known personality.

=== Occupation, imprisonment and later years ===
Following the Soviet invasion of Poland in 1939, Stepaniv's husband Roman emigrated. Olena, then aged 47, refused to leave her own people and stayed with her teenage son and elderly mother. Under German occupation, in 1942 Stepaniv led the statistics department in Lviv. She gathered and published data and it was said that the publications were intended to embarrass the country's occupiers. During the war she was working at Lviv University. After the end of the war, in 1947 she was accused by Yaroslav Halan and other supporters of the Soviet regime of collaboration with the Nazis.

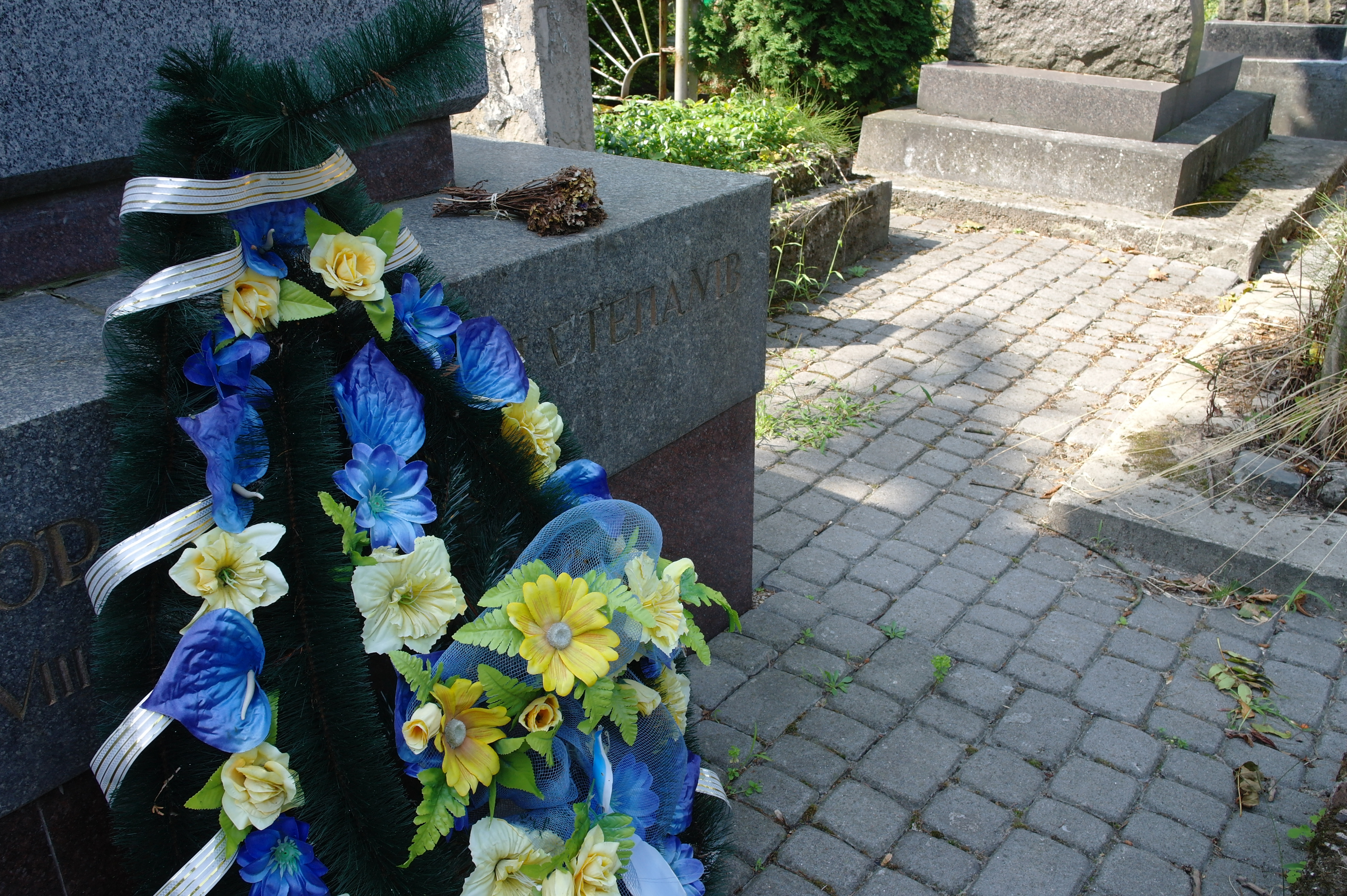
Olena Stepaniv's grave in Lviv

In 1949 Olena was arrested sent to a labour camp in Mordovia because of her patriotism and connections with the Ukrainian nationalist movement. Her property was confiscated, and all of her documents destroyed together with her and her husband's military awards. She was held there until 1956. After returning from imprisonment Stepaniv reunited with her son, who had also spent years in labour camps, and settled in a house on the outskirts of Lviv. Due to her previous conviction, Olena was barred from scientific work. Suffering from cancer, she died on 11 July 1963 and was buried at the Lychakiv Cemetery in presence of many visitors. Her husband Roman, who died in Austria in 1975, was reburied at the same cemetery in 2006.

== Private life ==
During a meeting of the Ukrainian Students' Union Stepaniv met Roman Dashkevych, who would later become a lawyer and a general-khorunzhyi (general-ensign) of the Ukrainian People's Army. The couple married in 1920. In 1926, their son, Yaroslav Dashkevych, was born.

== Legacy ==
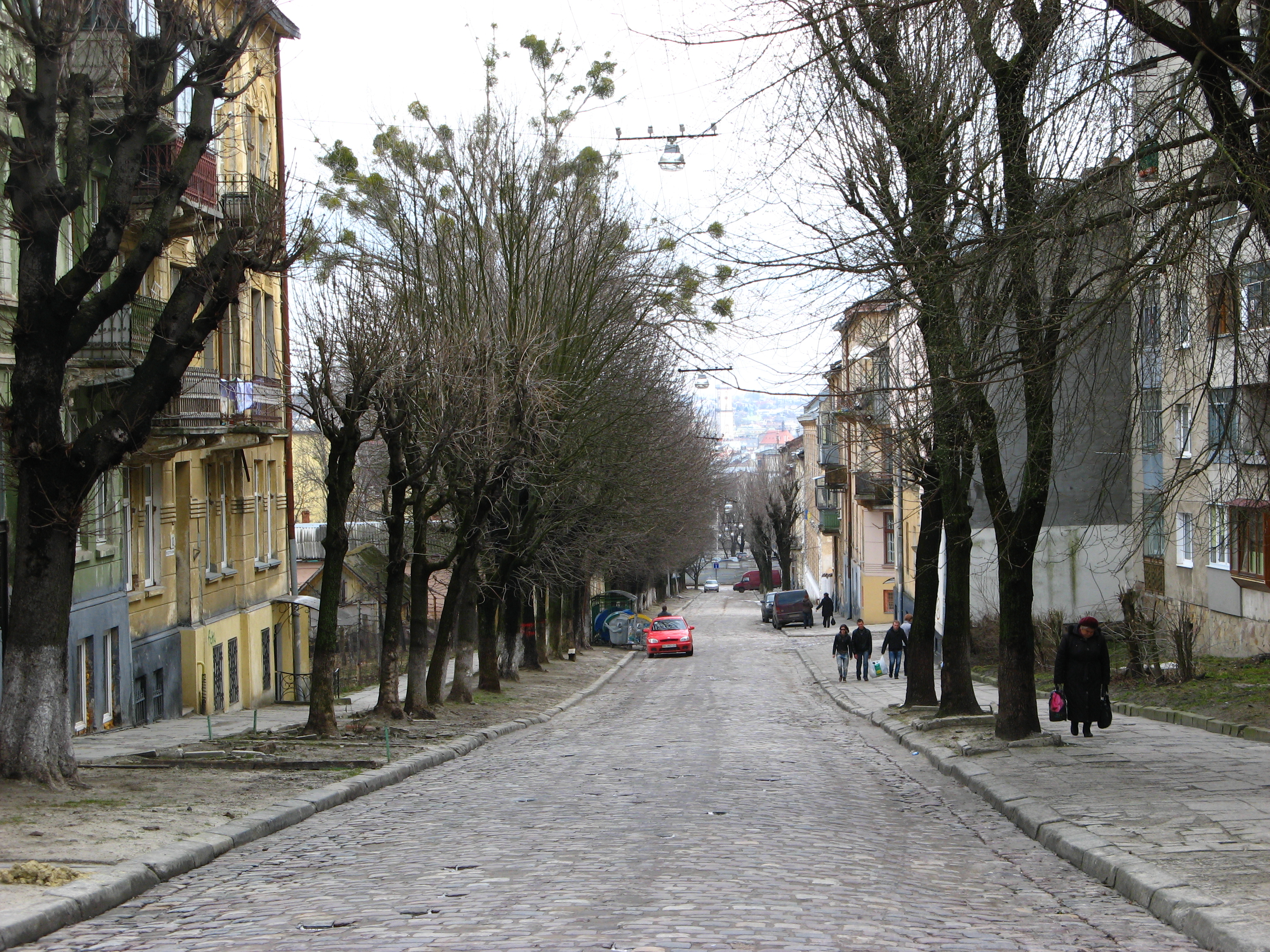
Stepanivny Street in Lviv in 2013

Stepaniv's life has been depicted in fictionalized biographies.

In 1991, a street in Lviv, Oleny Stepanivny Street, was renamed after her, citing her as the first woman to become a commissioned officer in the Ukrainian army. In 1992 centenary of her birth was celebrated, and a local award for female educators, scientists and activists in Lviv was named in her honour.

In October 2022, the Yelizaveta Chaikina street in Ukraine's capital Kyiv was renamed to Olena Stepaniv street.
