= Konstantyna Malytska =

Ukrainian educator, writer, and feminist leader (1872–1947)

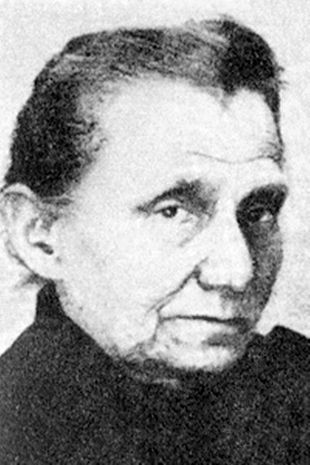
- Born: 30 May 1872; Kropyvnyk, Galicia, Austria-Hungary (now Ukraine)
- Died: 17 March 1947 (aged 74); Lviv, Ukrainian SSR, Soviet Union (now Ukraine)

Konstantyna Ivanivna Malytska or Rastyk; Vira Lebedova; Chaika Dnistrova (Ukrainian: Костянтина Іванівна Малицька; 30 May 1872 – 17 March 1947) was a Ukrainian educator, writer, and activist.

== Biography ==
Malytska was born in Kropyvnyk in Kalush Raion in 1872. She studied to be a teacher and graduated in 1892. She taught elementary education in Halych, Luzhany, and Lviv at the Shevchenko Girls' School.

In 1912, she organized a meeting for the "Women's Committee" in Lviv to prepare for the war that she saw as inevitable. Others at the meeting were Olena Stepaniv, Maria Biletska (1864-1937) and Olha Basarab. The money raised from the "National Combat Fund", they created, was used to fund the Ukrainian Sich Riflemen. and Stepaniv would be its first female officer.

In 1938, the Second Polish Republic declared the Ukrainian Women's Union illegal. As a result, another women's organization, the Druzhyna Kniahyni Olhy (Friends of Princess Ohla), was formed and Marytska became one of its leaders. The organisation's new existence was brief, as it disappeared when the Soviets occupied Galicia in 1939.

In the summer of 1941, she initiated the founding of the Women's Service of Ukraine society, and headed it until September 1941.

== Writing ==
Malytska wrote children's plays, songs, and magazine contributions. In 1899, she published children's stories in Mali druzi (Little Friends, 1899, 1906) and her articles about education in Maty (Mother, 1902) and Z trahedii dytiachykh dush (From the Tragedies of Children's Souls, 1907).

== Death ==
Malytska died in Lviv in 1947.
