= Sofia Halechko =

Austro-Hungarian soldier (1891–1918)

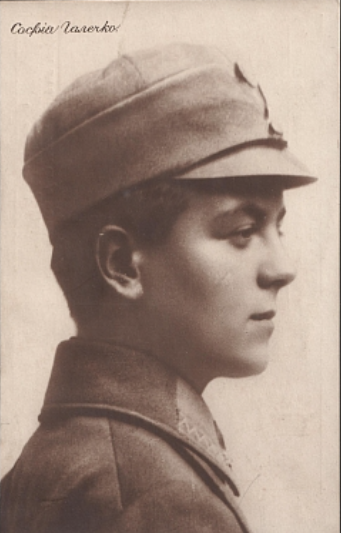
- Halechko c. 1917
- Born: 3 May 1891; Austria-Hungary
- Died: 31 August 1918 (aged 27); Pasichna, Ivano-Frankivsk Oblast, Ukrainian State
- Other name: Sophia Halechko
- Occupation: Soldier
- Known for: Ukrainian Sich Riflemen
- Partner: Andriy Kurovets

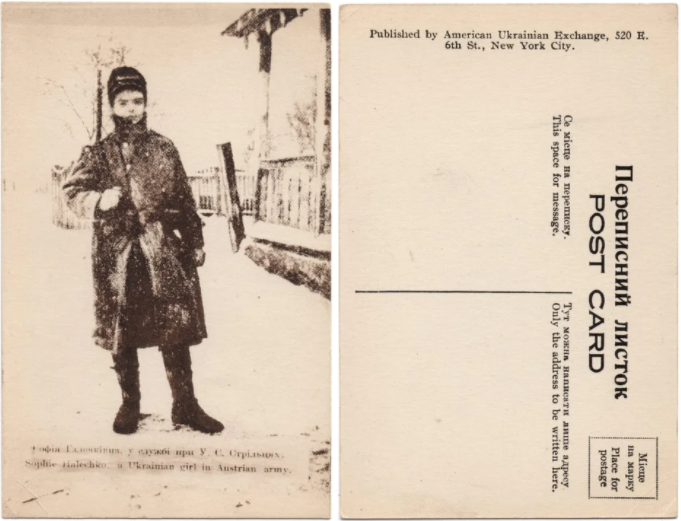
Halechko on a 1915 postcard

Sofia Halechko (3 May 1891 – 31 August 1918) was an Austro-Hungarian soldier and Ukrainian nationalist that was a member of the Ukrainian Sich Riflemen during World War I. Her first language was Polish but she hoped to achieve independence for Ukrainians and joined the riflemen to do so.

== Life ==
Halechko was born in 1891. Her first language was Polish, and her family's culture was Ukrainian-Polish. She was schooled at the Polish-speaking Juliusz Słowacki Girls Gymnasium in Lviv. She went on to study philosophy in Graz, where she became involved with the Sich Society. When her boyfriend Andriy Kurovets died, she decided to join the Ukrainian Sich Riflemen. She and Pavlyna Mychailyshyn joined to fight for the Austro-Hungarians against Russia because they hoped that the war would lead to independence for the Ukrainian people.

The riflemen were formed in 1914 out of volunteers from the Ukrainian-speaking part of Austria-Hungary. A number of these recruits had previously been university students. The Austro-Hungarians allowed this new regiment of Ukrainians, but they limited its size to 2,000 soldiers and only 60 officers. This was not because of a lack of volunteers but because they were concerned that they would be creating an independent army loyal to a Ukrainian nationalist cause. The regiment was armed with decades-old single-loading muskets. The volunteer riflemen were mainly all men, with an estimated 34 women also being a part of the regiment. Hanna Dmyterko, Pavlyna Mychailyshyn, Iryna Kus, Sofia Halechko, Olha Basarab, and Olena Stepaniv are among those noted as being in the regiment.

Women in the regiment were renowned, and among them, Olena Stepaniv became the most famous. Others like Halechko appeared on postcards. Both Halechko and Stepaniv were notably put in charge of detachments of riflemen. Halechko and Pavlyna Mychailyshyn were assigned relatively safer posts to reduce the possibility of them being captured by the Russians.

Halechko drowned in August 1918 after being caught in a whirlpool while swimming. Sixty years later, the fourth conference of Ukrainian seniors at Soyuzivka noted her contributions to the riflemen and the Ukrainian people.

== See also ==
- Sich Riflemen
- Sich (scouting)
