= Hanna Dmyterko =

Ukrainian soldier (1893 – 1981)

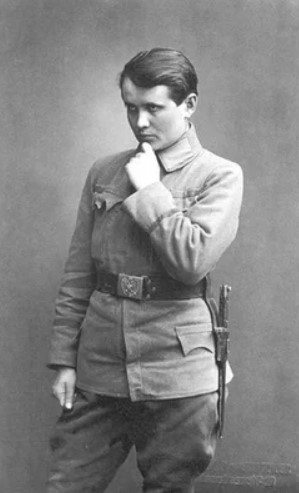
- Born: 9 February 1893; Senechiv, Dolyna, Ivano-Frankivsk Oblast, Austria-Hungary
- Died: 3 April 1981 (aged 88); Edison, New Jersey, United States
- Other name: Anna Ratych
- Occupation: Soldier
- Known for: Being a female Ukrainian Sich Rifleman
- Spouse: Vasyl Ratych (m. 1919)
- Children: 4

Hanna Dmyterko (Ukrainian: Ганна Дмитерко) or Anna Dmiterko and later also known as Hanna Ratych (9 February 1893 – 3 April 1981), was a Ukrainian soldier during World War I. She became a sergeant in the Ukrainian Sich Riflemen, a unit in the Austro-Hungarian Army. Her exploits were reported in the press, and she was decorated.

== Life ==
Dmyterko was born in 1893.

In 1914, Dmyterko was among 2,000 Ukrainians who made up the newly created Ukrainian Sich Riflemen. The Great War was starting and she saw this combat as an opportunity to create a Ukrainian nation. 28,000 Ukrainians had volunteered to join the new force but the Austrian authorities limited the size of the force and the scope of their weaponry to ensure that they did not become a full-fledged Ukrainian army. They were armed with muskets that dated from before she was born. The volunteer riflemen had 34 women including Dmyterko, Iryna Kus, Sofia Halechko, Dmyterko's friend Olena Stepaniv, and Olha Basarab. They, like many of the chosen recruits, were former university students. The new force was limited to 60 officers.

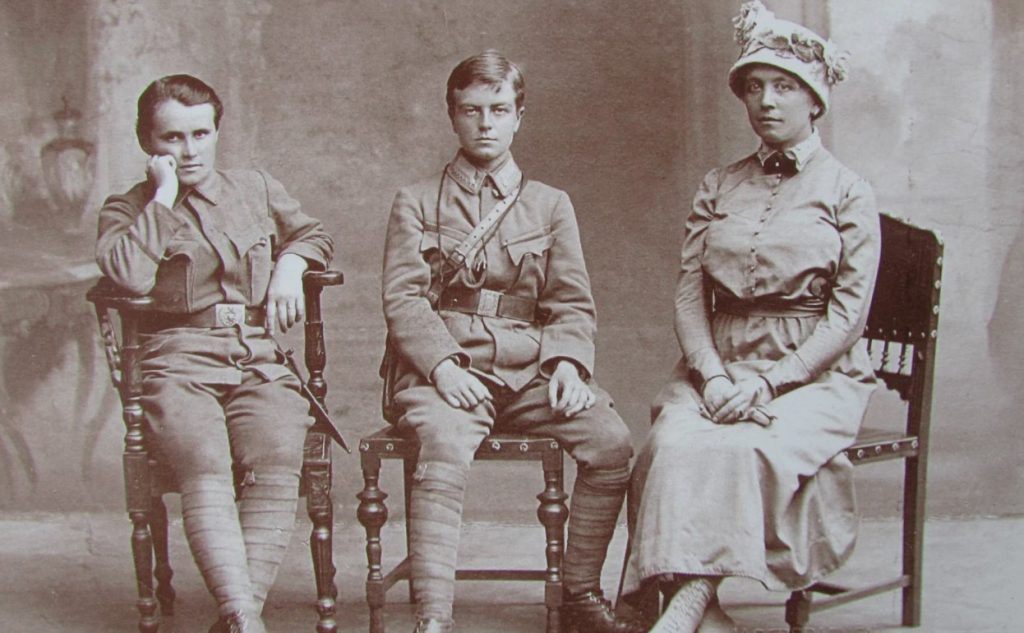
Three riflemen: Dmyterko, Sofia Halechko, and Olha Basarab in Vienna in 1917

Dmyterko left her family in the village of Pidberizka with only the support of her father, as her mother and grandmother disapproved of her fighting. Unusually, her unit was assigned to fight nearby, unlike the majority of the 100,000 Galician volunteers, who were assigned to battles in Italy.

The new force fought in September 1914 as part of the 55th Austrian division. A myth emerged that women served under assumed male names, which is unsubstantiated. When Dmyterko was awarded a medal for her service, her full name was listed in the military records. Foreign newspapers reported Dmyterko and her fellow women soldiers' exploits.

During her six years of service, she prepared food for the riflemen and cared for them as a nurse before being assigned to the command headquarters, where she worked as a clerk. She became a sergeant and met fellow soldier Vasyl Ratych. They married in 1919 and lived in Rohatyn. They had four sons and, in time, emigrated to North America.

== Death and legacy ==
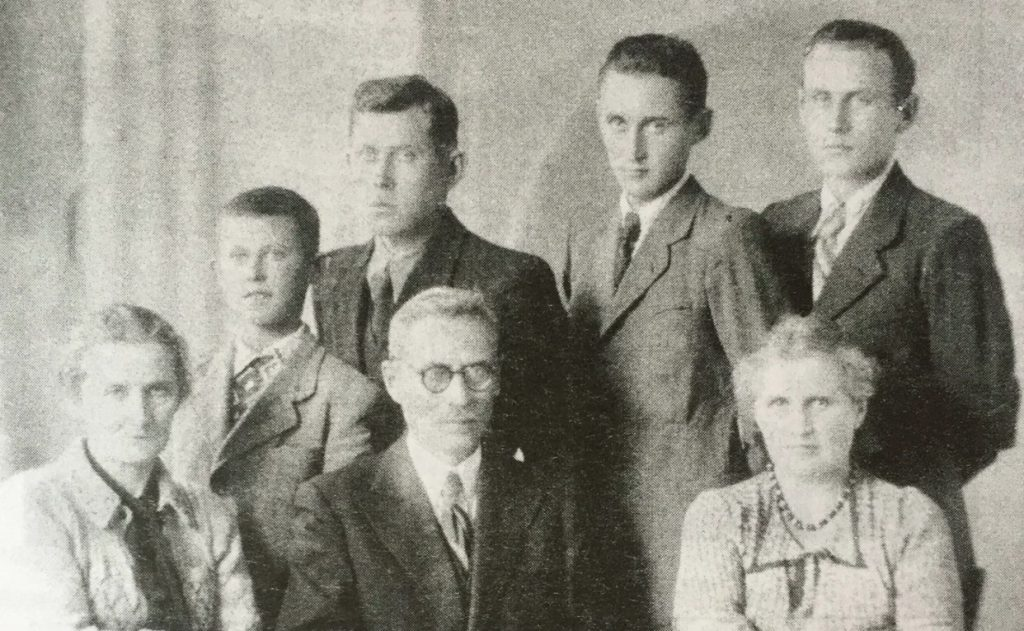
Left to right: Olena Stepaniv, Vasyl Ratych, Hanna Dmyterko Standing: Sons of the Ratyches

Dmyterko was known in her lifetime as a Ukrainian heroine together with Sofia Galechko, Olena Stepaniv, and Olha Pidvysotska. One of her sons, Volodar Ratych, died in World War II while serving in the Galicia Division, but Rostislav, Lubomyr and Bohdan survived.

In 1978, Dmyterko was invited (as Mrs. Ratych) to the fourth conference of Ukrainian seniors at the Ukrainian centre near New York, known as Soyuzivka, where she was honored at a veteran's lunch. She lived in Edison, New Jersey with her son Rostislav. She died in New Jersey in 1981. Her memoirs are second only to those of Olena Stepaniv as a source for those studying Ukrainian women's experiences in World War I.
