= Hipolit Terlecki =

Polish theologian

Hipolit Terlecki (1806–1890) was a Polish theologian. Terlecki was a Roman Catholic in the Latin Rite, an Eastern-rite Catholic, and an Orthodox.
