= Women in Ukraine =

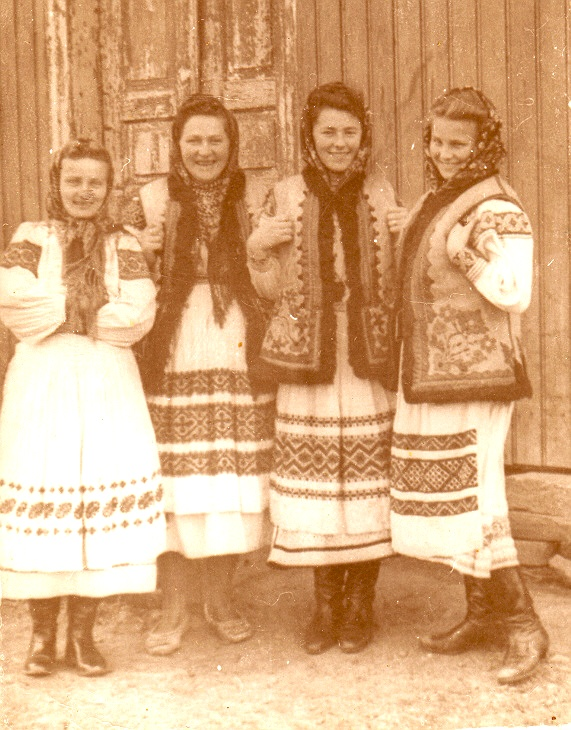
- Boyko women, c. late 1930s

General statistics
- Maternal mortality (per 100,000): 32 (2010)
- Women in parliament: 20.8% (2019)
- Women over 25 with secondary education: 91.5% (2012)
- Women in labour force: 62% [M:74%] (2016)

Gender Inequality Index
- Value: 0.200 (2021)
- Rank: 49th out of 191

Global Gender Gap Index
- Value: 0.707 (2022)
- Rank: 81st out of 146

Women in Ukraine have equal constitutional rights as men in the economic, political, cultural, and social fields, as well as in the family. At the same time, most of the around 45 percent of Ukraine's population who suffer from violence are females. Every fifth Ukrainian parliamentarian is a woman, while among major companies only 2% are managed by women.

The history of Ukraine during the past two centuries is closely connected to that of the Russian Empire and later on the Soviet Union. Ukraine gained independence in 1991, and is now a state with more than 40 million inhabitants, most of whom are Christian Orthodox, and 70% of the population is urban. The women's rights movement in Ukraine had its beginnings in the mid-19th century, but for most of the following period its activities were centered around the struggle for general national emancipation, avoiding the reinterpretation of traditional gender roles.

The rise in feminist activism started during the latter part of 2000s, and was significantly influenced by the 2014 Revolution of Dignity and the following Russo-Ukrainian War, which once again brought women to the forefront of struggle for democracy and national sovereignty. Those events produced unique challenges for women, but at the same time gave them a possibility to enter the country's armed forces on par with men.

== History ==
=== Early history ===
==== Kyivan Rus' ====
Personal signature of French queen Anna (Anne), daughter of Kyivan prince Yaroslav the Wise

Ruska Pravda, the legal code of Kyivan Rus', recognized the equality of genders, establishing the same responsibility for the murder of a woman as for that of a man. Legal rights of women were not limited, and a widow would automatically take the place of her deceased husband as head of the family. If division of inheritance between several sons had not been mentioned in a man's will, his widow had the right to decide it herself. Part of the inheritance remained property of the widow, and she had the right to transfer it to one of her children. Daughters were excluded from inheritance and could only receive dowry. If a female slave had common issue with her owner, she was excluded from his inheritance, but received freedom along with her children. Relatively broad rights of women in comparison to the contemporary Roman and Germanic Law could result from the influence of Slavic common law.

Wives of Rus' princes could rise to important positions in the society, serving as regents and managing princely property after their husbands' deaths. They could also serve as hegumenes, heading monasteries. Several Rus' princesses entered the ranks of European nobility by marrying foreign rulers: Anna Yaroslavna, who became Queen of France; Anastasia Yaroslavna, spouse of Andrew I of Hungary; Eupraxia, daughter of Vsevolod, who became a Holy Roman Empress; Euphrosyne, daughter of Mstislav, wife of Géza II of Hungary. In 1087 a school for girls was established by princess Anna Vsevolodovna in Kyiv.

==== Early Modern era ====
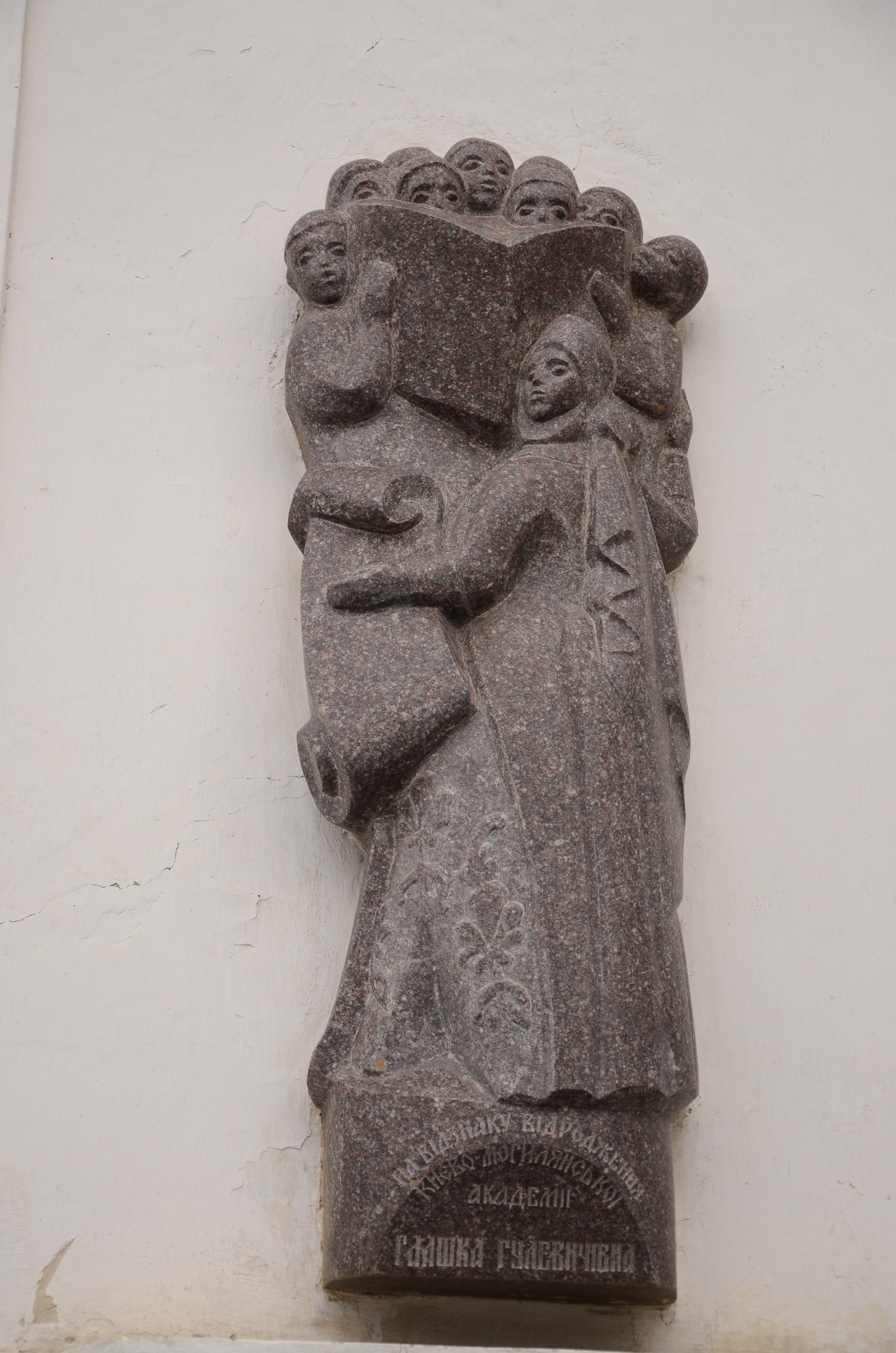
Commemorative plaque to Halshka Hulevychivna in Kyiv Mohyla Academy, to the foundation of which she contributed

According to the Statutes of Lithuania, women could be subjects of rights and duties and had no general limitations in their legal actions. Pregnant women were provided special protection by the law. Daughters were deprived of the right to inherit land, but marriage contracts involved a special clause, which provided the wife one-third of her husband's estate, which she could manage on her own. Among the lower classes, the process of enserfment led to the obligation for many women to participate in corvée labour. Many Ukrainian noblewomen of the time were active in the religious and cultural sphere, most notably Anastasia Olshanska, Halshka Hulevychivna, Raina Vyshnevetska, Sofia Chortoryiska and Anna Hojska. Numerous women from Ukraine were captured and enslaved as a result of Tatar raids, ending up in Ottoman harems. Since that time, the images of female captives such as Roxelana and Marusia Bohuslavka have taken an important place in Ukrainian culture.

The Statutes of Lithuania in combination with local common law continued to define the legal status of women under the Cossack Hetmanate. According to a 1743 book of law, stricter punishment was introduced for the murder of women in comparison to men. At the same time, unmarried women were to receive less severe sanctions for committed crimes. During the Cossack era, the living conditions of female serfs were as a rule harder than those of men, many of whom could migrate to Zaporizhia. Wives of Zaporozhian Cossacks would take over the management of their husbands' estates while the latter were at war, and in some cases women would even take part in military engagements themselves. Among Cossack women who played an important role in Ukrainian politics of the era were Hanna Zolotarenko, the wife of Bohdan Khmelnytsky; Maria Mokiyevska, the mother of Ivan Mazepa; the wife of Semen Paliy; Hanna Hertsyk and Anastasia Markovych, the wives of hetmans Pylyp Orlyk and Ivan Skoropadsky respectively. During his travels through Ukraine, Paul of Aleppo marked the high educational level of local women, and mentioned the existence of a school at the Ascension Monastery in Kyiv.

Women were disproportionately affected by accusations of witchcraft, which were widespread in Ukrainian lands under the rule of the Polish-Lithuanian Commonwealth and the Hetmanate. According to modern research, almost 80% of all people accused of witchcraft in Ukraine during the 17th and 18th centuries were females. Evidence of application of torture to suspected witches is contained in 17th and 18th-century records from Lviv, Kamianets-Podilskyi and Kremenets. In Left-bank Ukraine, six women were burned in 1667 after being accused of employing magic against hetman Ivan Briukhovetsky and his wife Daria Dolgorukova, which supposedly resulted in a miscarriage. However, in total only around 5% of the accused were tortured, mostly due to the lack of hangmen and the generally milder character of judiciary in comparison to Western countries. Only a small part of accused were sentenced to death, and in more than half of cases the courts refused to investigate witchcraft accusations. Persecution of witches in Poland-Lithuania was officially stopped in 1776, one year after a ban on witch trials had been introduced in the Russian Empire. Despite this, accusations of witchcraft continued to be present in Ukrainian court records into the 19th century.

==== Early to mid-19th century ====
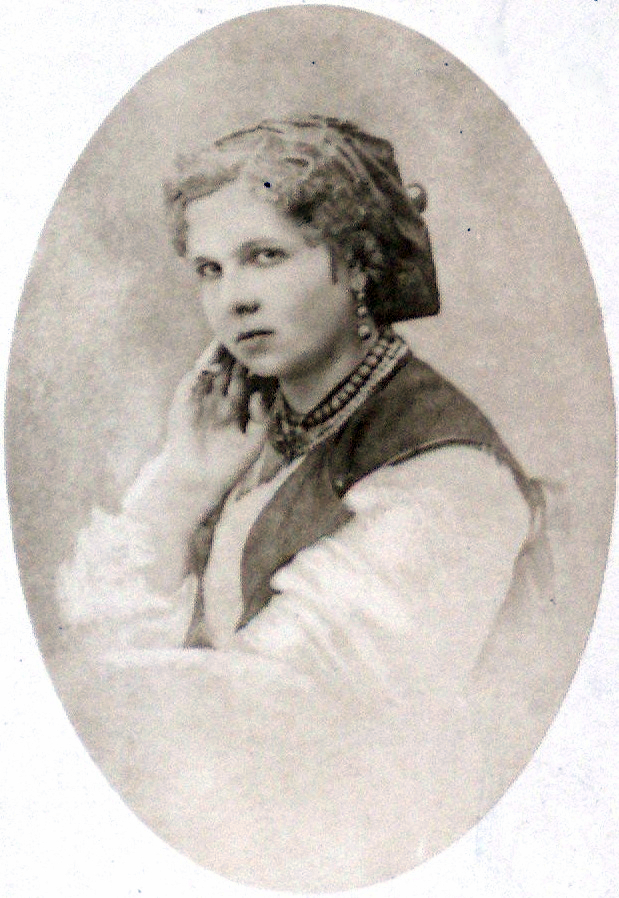
Yelyzaveta Myloradovych, a Ukrainian noblewoman who co-founded the Shevchenko Scientific Society

Following the incorporation of Ukrainian lands by the Russian and Austrian empires in the late 18th century, women's rights were defined by the civil law of the respective states. For the first time, noblewomen received the right to inherit land. However, the status of women from lower strata of the society didn't undergo any significant change, and they remained dependent from their families, lacking legal protection. During that time, many women in Left-bank Ukraine engage in production of handicrafts.

In the early 19th century Institutes for Noble Maidens were established in Kharkiv and Poltava (1818), Odesa (1829) and Kyiv (1833). In 1850 the first girls' gymnasium opened in Kyiv. In 1853 and 1868-1870 two magazines for educated women were published in Lviv.

Following the start of the Ukrainian national revival, many Ukrainian women became famous as literary figures, actresses and social activists. Women made a big contribution to the development of education, and some, like Yelyzaveta Myloradovych, served as patrons of science. During the 1850s and 1860s, numerous Sunday schools were established by members of Ukrainian intelligentsia, with some of them providing education specifically to women.

=== Beginnings of the feminist movement ===
==== Under Russian rule ====
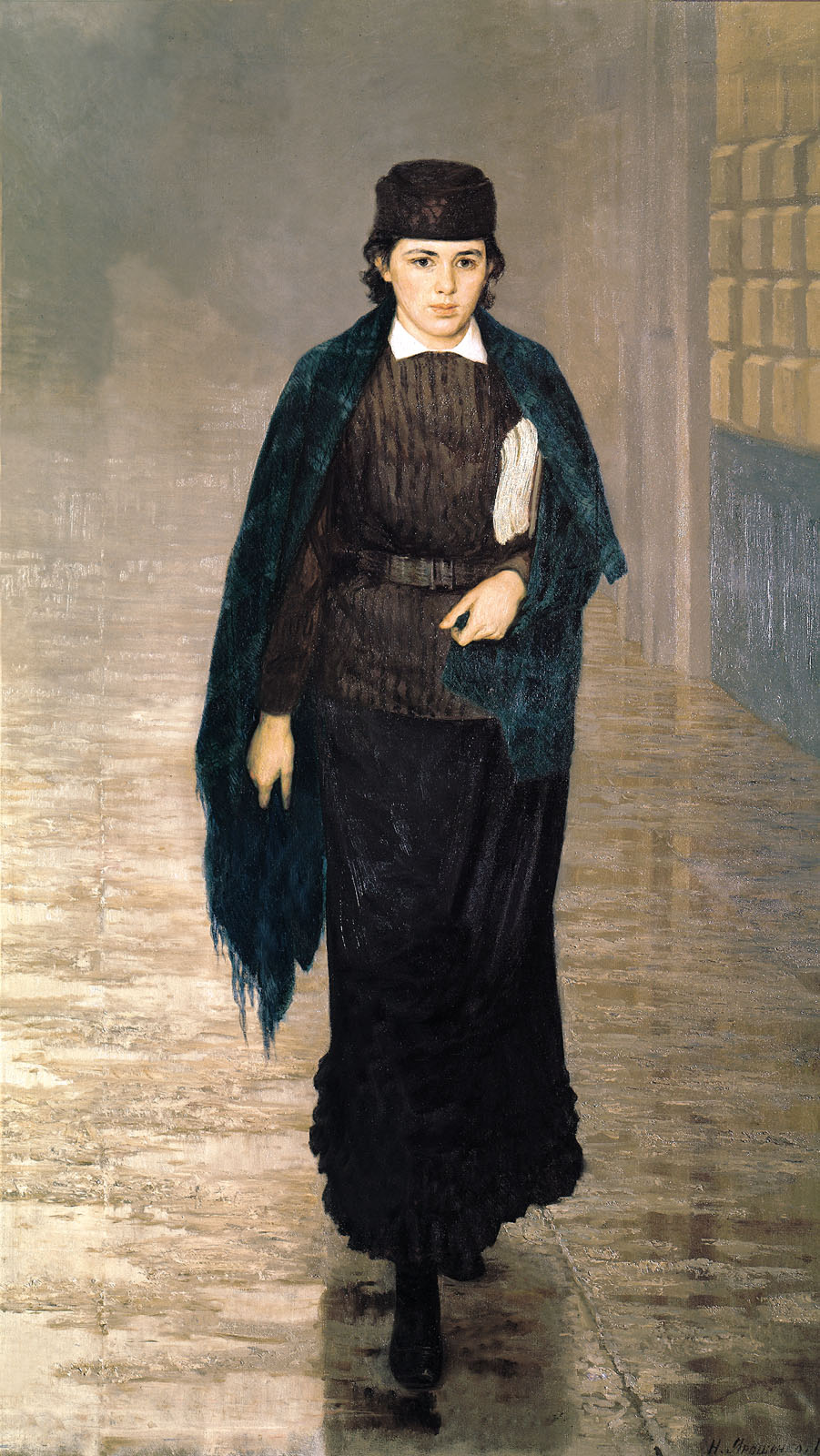
A Student Girl, 1883 painting by Ukrainian-born artist Mykola Yaroshenko

The beginnings of the Ukrainian women's movement can be found in the mid-19th century, and are connected with the 1860 educational reform, which allowed women in the Russian Empire to enter universities. Although soon aborted, this decision contributed to the establishment of Ukraine's first women's organization, the Society for Help in Women's Higher Education, in Kharkiv. The movement also involved members of the Old Hromada. In 1878 Higher Women's Courses were opened in Kyiv, and in 1880 in Kharkiv. The first exclusively Ukrainian women's circle was established in 1884 in Kyiv.

Several prominent women of Ukrainian origin were active in the narodnik movement in the Russian Empire. Most prominent among them were educator Khrystyna Alchevska and revolutionaries Sophia Perovskaya and Olga Zhelyabova. During the 1900s several women were members of the Revolutionary Ukrainian Party, among them Anastasia Hrinchenko. At the same time, the Women's Hromada and the Society for Protection of Working Women were established in Kyiv and Kharkiv. Among their notable activists were Nadia Dovnar-Zapolska and Olha Kosach. The Kharkiv society, which was active between 1903 and 1919, supported a kindergarten, a girls' gymnasium and organized Higher Women's Courses with a program equivalent to one of a university.

In general, women's movement in Ukrainian lands under the Russian Empire was characterized with its members' concentration on common popular struggle for emancipation, limiting themselves with support of women's rights for work and education, and not opposing cooperation with male activists.

==== Under Austrian rule ====
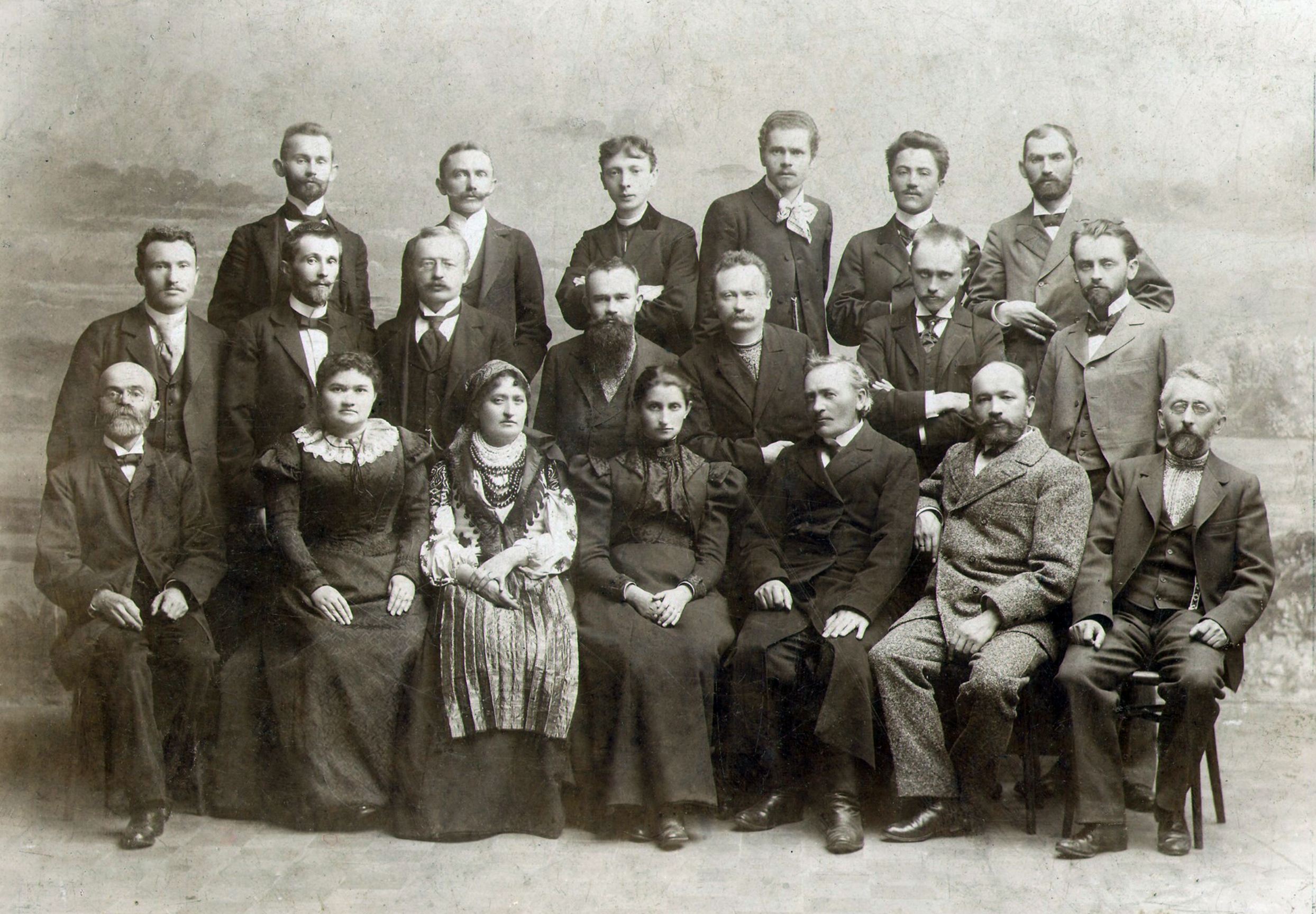
1898 photo of the members of Shevchenko Scientific Society in Lviv, including Yevheniya Yaroshynska, Natalia Kobrynska and Olha Kobylianska

Women's movement in Austrian-ruled Western Ukrainian lands began in 1884 with the foundation of the Society of Ruthenian Women by Natalia Kobrynska in Stanislaviv. In 1887 the organization published its almanac. In 1890 Ukrainian women of Galicia petitioned the Vienna Parliament to provide them with rights to receive higher education, and in 1891 the first female viche was organized in Stryi. A prominent women's organization in Galicia was the Club of Ruthenian Women, founded in 1893. In 1906, the Women's Hromada was established in Bukovyna.

An important figure in the Ukrainian women's movement was Sofia Okunevska, the first female university graduate and the first woman to serve as a doctor under Austrian rule. In 1900, women in Austria-Hungary finally received rights to attain higher education. During the early 20th century, Ukrainian women's organizations in the area engaged in social activities, which included foundations of girls' schools, workshops, kindergartens, vacation homes and protection of maidservants. In Lviv and Chernivtsi student societies for Ukrainian girls were created, and in 1908 the first magazine for young women started publishing.

In 1909 two women's organizations in Lviv merged, creating the Women's Hromada headed by Konstantyna Malytska. In 1906 and 1910 major female congresses (viche) were organized in support of women's political rights. Several women were active in the Social Democratic and Radical parties, most prominently Anna Pavlyk. Religious women's organizations were represented in Lviv by the Marian Society of Women (1904), and in Chernivtsi by the Catholic Myrrhbearers Society and the Society of Orthodox Ruthenian Women (1908). Such groups usually engaged in philanthropic and educational activities.

=== First World War and Interwar Era ===
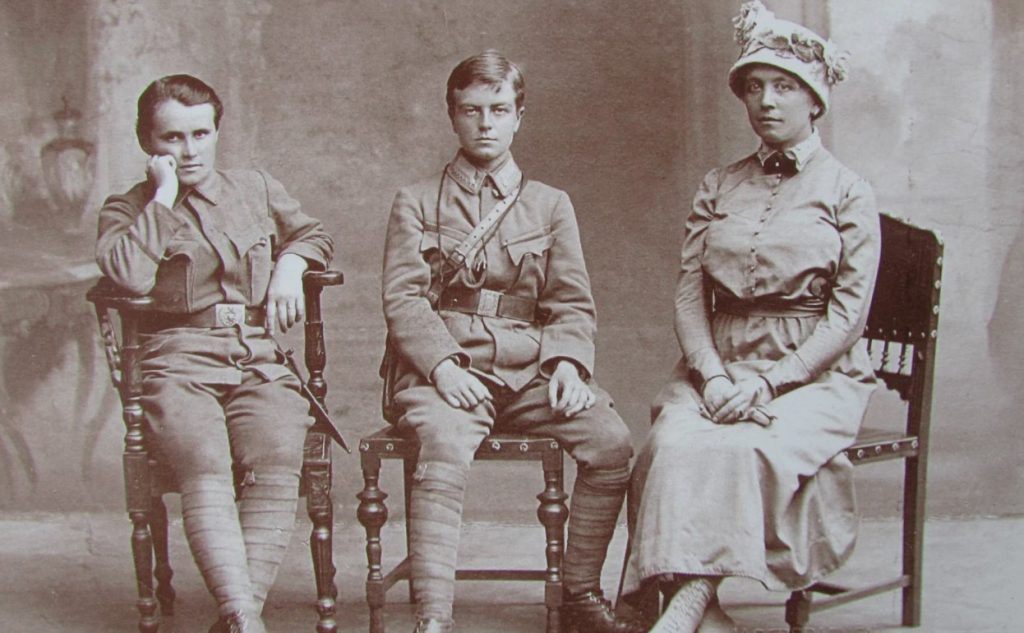
Hanna Dmyterko, Sofia Halechko and Olha Basarab serving in the ranks of Ukrainian Sich Riflemen, in 1917

==== First World War and War of Independence ====
During the First World War women's organizations in Ukrainian lands engaged in charity work, helping the sick, refugees, hostages and prisoners of war. Kyiv's Ukrainian Club was transferred into a hospital, where many women were employed. Important work in providing help to war orphans and prisoners of war from Galicia and Bukovyna deported to Siberia was performed by Liudmyla Starytska-Cherniakhivska. On the Austrian side of the frontline, a Committee for Help to Wounded Soldiers was founded by Ukrainian women in Vienna. Many Ukrainian women worked as nurses in the Austro-Hungarian Army, and some even volunteered to the military. Among notable female members of the Ukrainian Sich Riflemen were Olena Stepaniv, Sofia Halechko and Hanna Dmyterko. Even more women served in the Ukrainian People's Army and various guerrilla units, most prominently Marusya Sokolovska.

Following the Revolution of 1917, Ukrainian women actively participated in political and civic activities. Among female members of the Ukrainian Central Rada and the Ukrainian National Council were Liudmyla Starytska-Cherkniakhivska, Sofia Rusova and Natalia Kobrynska. In September 1917 the Ukrainian Women's Union was established at a congress in Kyiv, and in 1918 the publication of Women's Herald started. In order to represent women of the Ukrainian People's Republic on the international stage, in 1919 the Ukrainian Women's National Council was founded in Kamianets-Podilskyi. Its members took part in congresses of the International Council of Women, International Women's Union and the International League for Peace and Freedom.

The 1918 Constitution of the Ukrainian People's Republic recognized women as fully equal to men in terms of rights. The temporary constitution of the West Ukrainian People's Republic, which was adopted later during the same year, provided electoral rights to all citizens irespective of gender.

==== Early Soviet rule ====
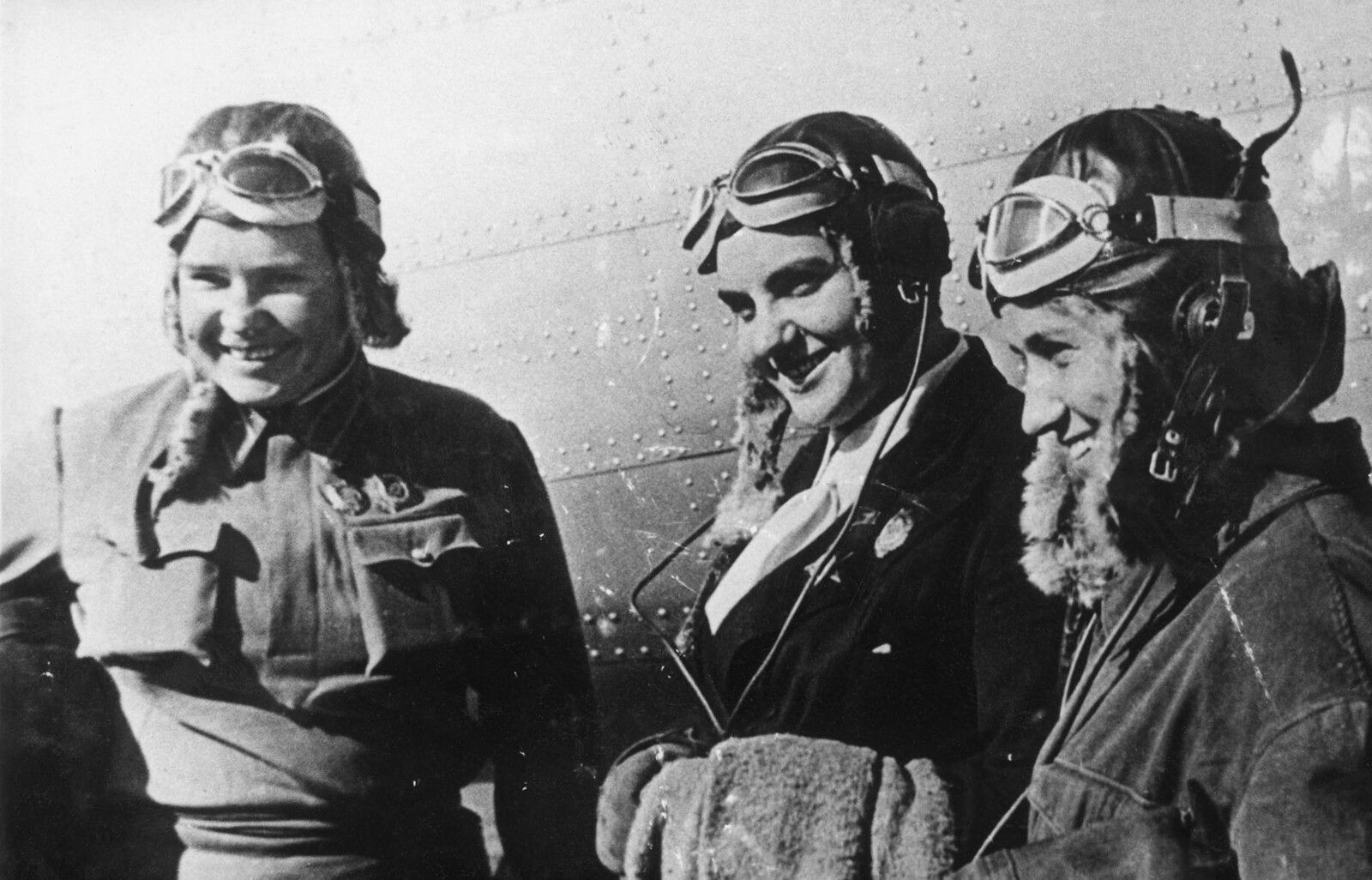
Ukrainian-born aviators Polina Osipenko and Valentina Grizodubova posing with their colleague Marina Raskova in 1938; all three were promoted by Soviet media as examples of "new Soviet women".

A notable promoter of feminist ideas in the Bolshevik party was Alexandra Kollontai, a revolutionary of Ukrainian origin, who for a short period of time served as Soviet Ukraine's People's Commissar of Propaganda. Kollontai played a leading role in the introduction of International Women's Day as a state holiday.

During the Interwar period, the Ukrainian women's movement could freely develop only outside the borders of the Soviet Union. In the Ukrainian SSR formal proclamation of gender equality by authorities resulted in the ban on all women's civic organizations. Those were initially replaced by "women's departments" inside of the Communist Party, which mobilized women for political campaigns of the government, but were disbanded in 1930. At the same time, women continued to play an important role in the scientific and cultural life of Soviet Ukraine. Several notable Ukrainian women's activists were accused of oppositional activities and persecuted during show trials, such as the Union for the Freedom of Ukraine trial.

During the collectivization and Holodomor famine in the Ukrainian SSR, authorities practiced the recruitment of peasant women in order to execute the policies of dekulakization and confiscation of grain from private owners. Some female activists who joined the regime's campaigns were motivated by their belief in Communist ideology and personal opposition to the older generation's conservatism, while others wanted to enrich themselves at the cost of their neighbours deemed to be "kulaks", or acted out of fear, conformism and sadistic tendencies. On the other hand, many women took part in active resistance against the collectivization.

The 1937 Constitution of Ukrainian SSR formally recognized the equality of men and women. However, its declarations created a disadvantage to the female part of the population, as women could now be employed in hard labour on par with men. Soviet authorities worked to involve women into the Stakhanovite movement, leading to increasing exploitation of female workforce in the absence of functioning trade unions. At the same time, new employment possibilities led to an increase in number of women receiving secondary and higher education, with females comprising more than half of all students in Soviet medical and pedagogical schools. Female candidates were also given a chance to run during elections.

==== Western Ukraine ====
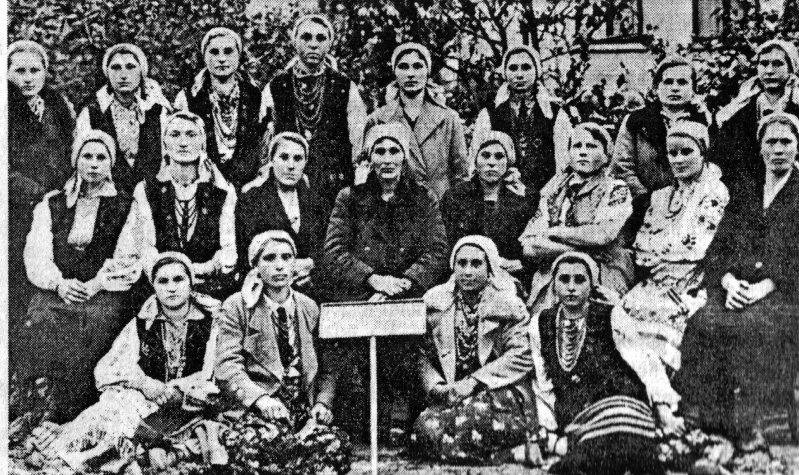
Members of the Ukrainian Women's Union in 1932

One of the biggest feminist organizations in Europe was founded during the 1920s in modern western Ukrainian region of Galicia. The organization was called the Ukrainian Women's Union and was led by Milena Rudnytska. Polish authorities banned a women's congress called up by the organization in 1921 in Lviv, but despite government repression Ukrainian women's political activities in the region continued. A big role in this process was played by women's press publications. In Rivne, the Union of Ukrainian Women of Volhynia started operation, and during the 1930s women's professional unions became active around Ukrainian cooperatives. In 1931 members of the Ukrainian Radical Party established the Women's Hromada, and starting from 1934 female circles started to emerge in the Ukrainian Catholic Union. Following the disbandment of the Ukrainian Women's Union by Polish authorities, in 1938 another women's political organization, Druzhyna of Princess Olga, was founded in Lviv.

Ukrainian women in Poland were also active on the parliamentary level, with several representatives from among their number being elected to the Senate of Poland and Sejm. Many female students also joined the activities of the Ukrainian Military Organization and Organization of Ukrainian Nationalists (OUN). Olha Basarab's death in police custody in 1924 made her a popular figure among the patriotic youth, and many women were later subjected to trials for supporting the nationalist movement. A special committee was formed by Ukrainian women in Lviv in order to help the political prisoners.

In Bukovyna and Transcarpathia activities of Ukrainian women's organizations became more widespread after 1930. In 1934 the first women's congress of Transcarpathia was created by the female section of local Prosvita and the Women's Union. In 1938-1939 many young women joined the ranks of Carpathian Sich.

==== In emigration ====
UNWLA logo

During the 1920s, women's organizations emerged among the Ukrainian diaspora in Austria, Poland, Germany and Czechoslovakia. In 1925 the Ukrainian National Women's League of America (UNWLA) was established in New York City, followed by the Union of Ukrainian Women of Canada in Saskatoon one year later. In 1930 the Organization of Ukrainian Women of Canada was created by Canadian Ukrainians. In the USA, Ukrainian nationalist women founded the Golden Cross society. In 1944 the League of Ukrainian Catholic Women of Canada started its operations. In the same year, several Ukrainian female organizations united into the Committee of Ukrainian Women of Canada. Female sections were also active at Ukrainian community organizations in Argentina and Brazil. These organizations were active in preserving Ukrainian culture in emigration, providing informational support about the Ukrainian cause and providing help to Ukrainians in their native land.

Many women from the Ukrainian diaspora took part in international congresses, promoting women's rights, supporting education and cooperative activities. The 1934 women's congress in Stanislaviv, which also involved many diaspora activists, contributed to the establishment of the Lviv-based World Union of Ukrainian Women in 1937.

=== World War II and aftermath ===
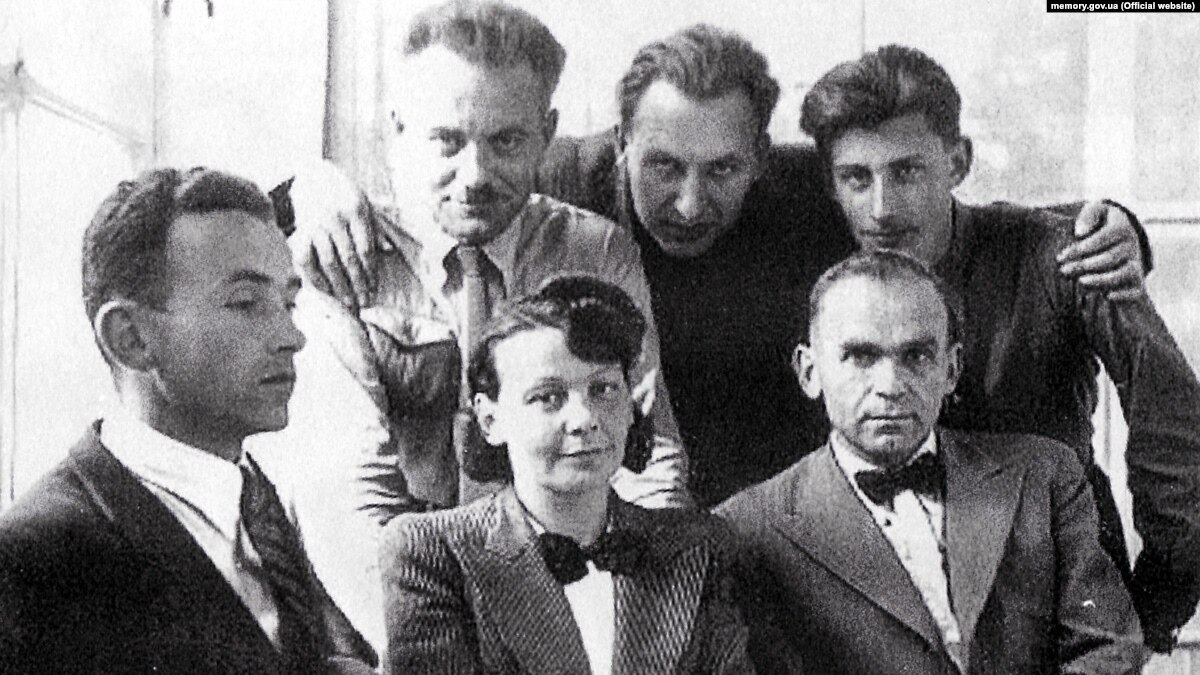
OUN activists in 1941, with Olena Teliha sitting in the middle

Following the retreat of Bolshevik forces from parts of Ukraine in 1941, Ukrainian women organized help to prisoners and war victims, taking part in organizations such as Ukrainian Red Cross, but those were swiftly banned by Nazi occupiers. Only a women's section at the Ukrainian Central Committee was permitted to continue its activities. Many female Ukrainian activists fell victim to German repressions, most prominently Olena Teliha. Numerous women joined the ranks of the Ukrainian Insurgent Army, providing medical aid, communication and serving on the battlefield.

Following the end of the war, all Ukrainian lands were occupied by the USSR. During the Soviet era, feminism was classified as a bourgeois ideology, hence counterrevolutionary and anti-Soviet. As a result, civil society and feminism were virtually nonexistent in the Soviet times.

During the first postwar years, many Ukrainian women became prioners of Soviet GULAG camps, where they were forced to perform hard labour on par with men. Tough living conditions in the camps, as well as widespread practice of humiliation and rape by guards and male prisoners led to mass mortality among female inmates. Those who survived claimed that artistic activities, such as creation of embroidery, singing, writing of poetry or retelling the plots of literary works and films helped them cope with the situation. Not all resistance was passive though: in 1953-1954 women from Ukraine were among the participants of uprisings in Norilsk and Karaganda prison camps..

Ukrainian women's organizations continued their activities in emigration, with main centres of their activities being Western Europe and the Americas. In 1948 the World Federation of Ukrainian Women's Organizations was established in Philadelphia. These organizations played a big role in help to Ukrainian emigrants, promoted Ukrainian art, organized educational activities for the youth and took part in international congresses. Many Ukrainian women in the diaspora were also active in the Plast and Ukrainian Youth Association.

=== Independent Ukraine ===
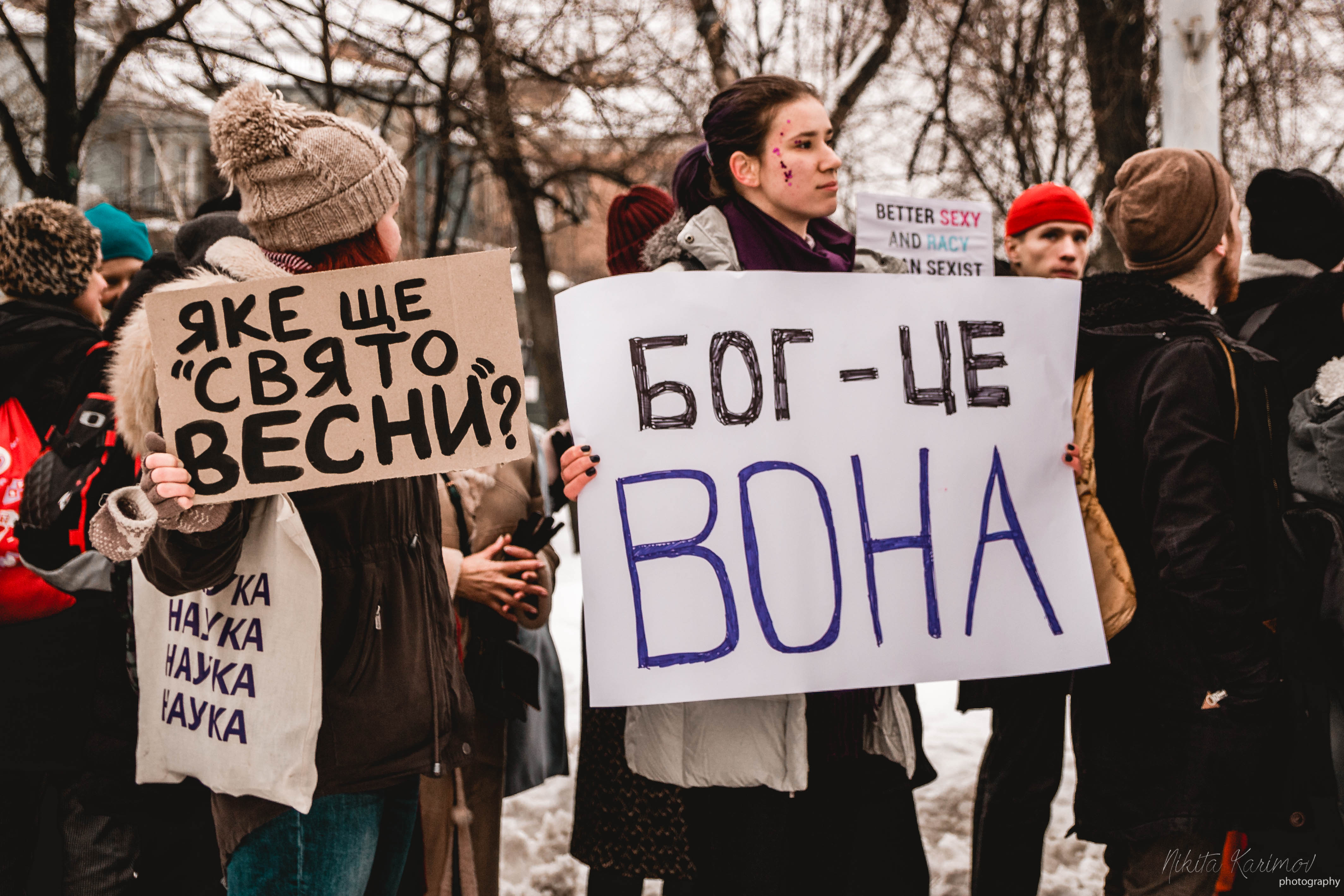
2018 Women's March participants in Kyiv

After Ukraine regained independence in 1991, a feminist movement began taking root. The 1990s saw the emergence of important studies on the history of Ukrainian feminism, with prominent works being published among others by Martha Bohachevsky-Chomiak and Solomiia Pavlychko.

During the early years of Ukraine's existence as a sovereign state, the ideology of the country's feminist movement was greatly influenced by ideas prioritizing support for national statehood, inherited from the diaspora, and was characterized as "national feminism". Genuine feminist discourse remained a minority phenomenon during that period. The situation started changing between 2007 and 2010, when radical feminist movements, representing anarcho-feminism and feminist separatism, spread their activities in the country.

Starting from at least 2010, annual feminist marches have been organized on International Women's Day in Ukraine. During that period, several women's rights groups were active in the country, including Feminist Ofenzyva and Ukrainian Women's Union. FEMEN, the most active women's rights group in Kyiv, was officially closed in 2013. The organization left Ukraine because the leadership feared "for their lives and freedom".

The Euromaidan protests also involved several feminist organizations, but led to frictions and attacks by right-wing participants of the movement. A group of female activists of the campaign eventually organized themselves into a "Female Sotnia" named after Olha Kobylianska. Some critics considered the group's activities a symptom of a right-wing turn of the Ukrainian feminist movement.

During the war in Donbas that started in 2014, a "huge volunteer movement of women organizing humanitarian action and community dialogue" developed, according to Oksana Potapova, a feminist and peacebuilding researcher and activist who created Theatre for Dialogue, a non-governmental organization in support of the women's volunteer movement.

==== Russian invasion of Ukraine ====
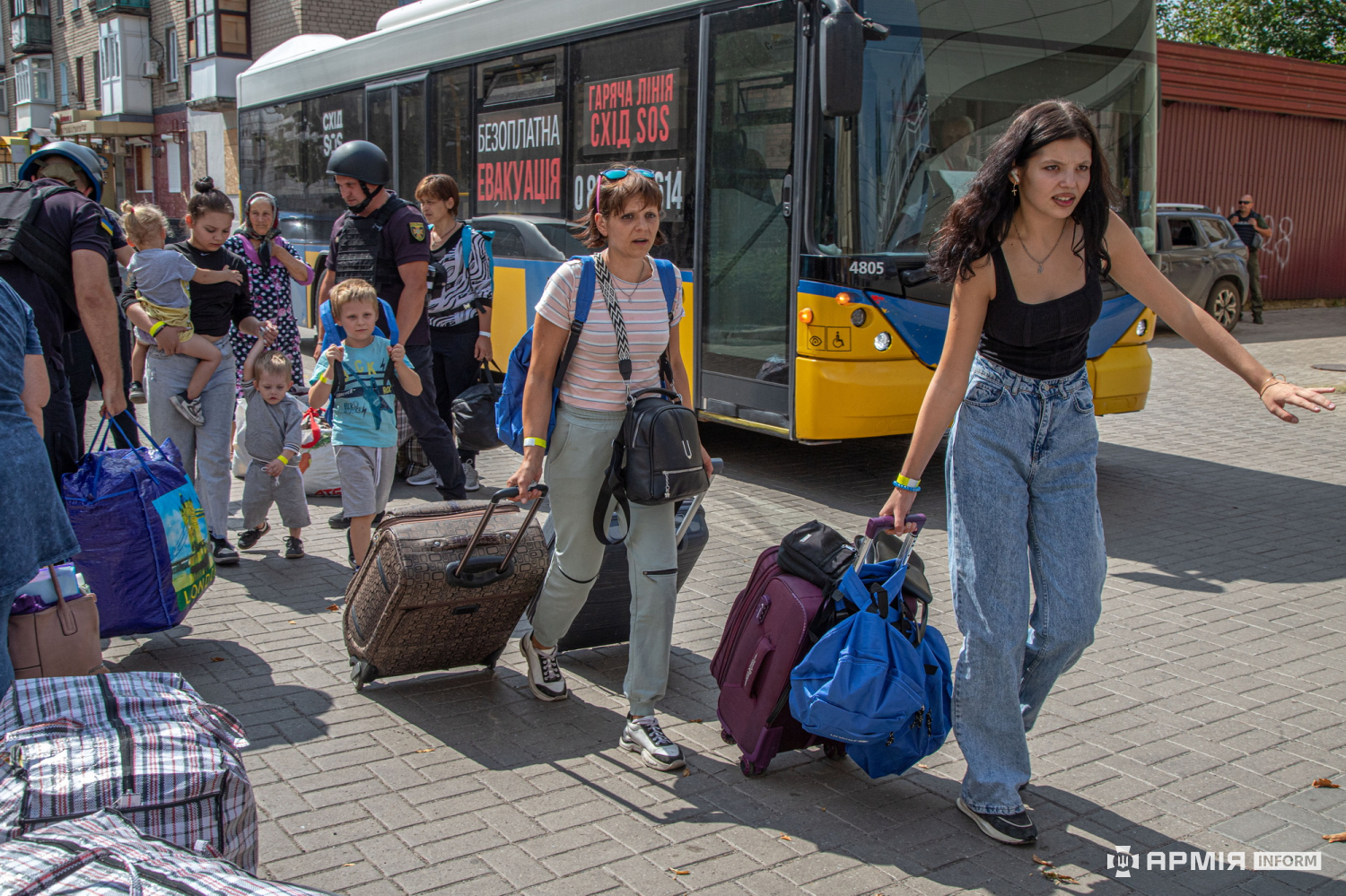
Women with children evacuating from Pokrovsk during the Russian invasion in 2024

UN Human Women reports higher rates of trafficking and gender-based violence in Ukraine since the start of the full-scale invasion by Russia. Ukrainian women who are pregnant and postpartum face unique challenges, like giving birth in shelters. U.N. High Commissioner for Human Rights verified 75 attacks on medical centers. A pregnant woman was photographed being carried out on a stretcher from a children's hospital in Mariupol, after a targeted attack. Mothers who have three or more children are able to leave the country with their husband for safety; men with 1 or 2 children are not allowed to leave the country.

== Violence against women ==
Around 45 percent of Ukraine's population (45 million) suffer violence – physical, sexual, or mental – and most of them are women. Street women are the most vulnerable category; around 40 percent of them suffer from sexual violence, with 25 percent being under 18. In 2001, Ukraine enacted the Domestic Violence (Prevention) Act 2001. Article 173-2 of the Code of Administrative Offences of Ukraine also deals with "violence over family". Nuzhat Ehsan, the UN Population Fund representative in Ukraine, stated in February 2013 "Ukraine really has an unacceptable level of violence, mainly by men and mainly due to high level of alcohol consumption". She also blamed loopholes in the legislation for contributing to the problem of domestic violence, "You can violate women and still if you are a high-level official or from a high-level official family, you can get away with it".

== Women in the labor force ==
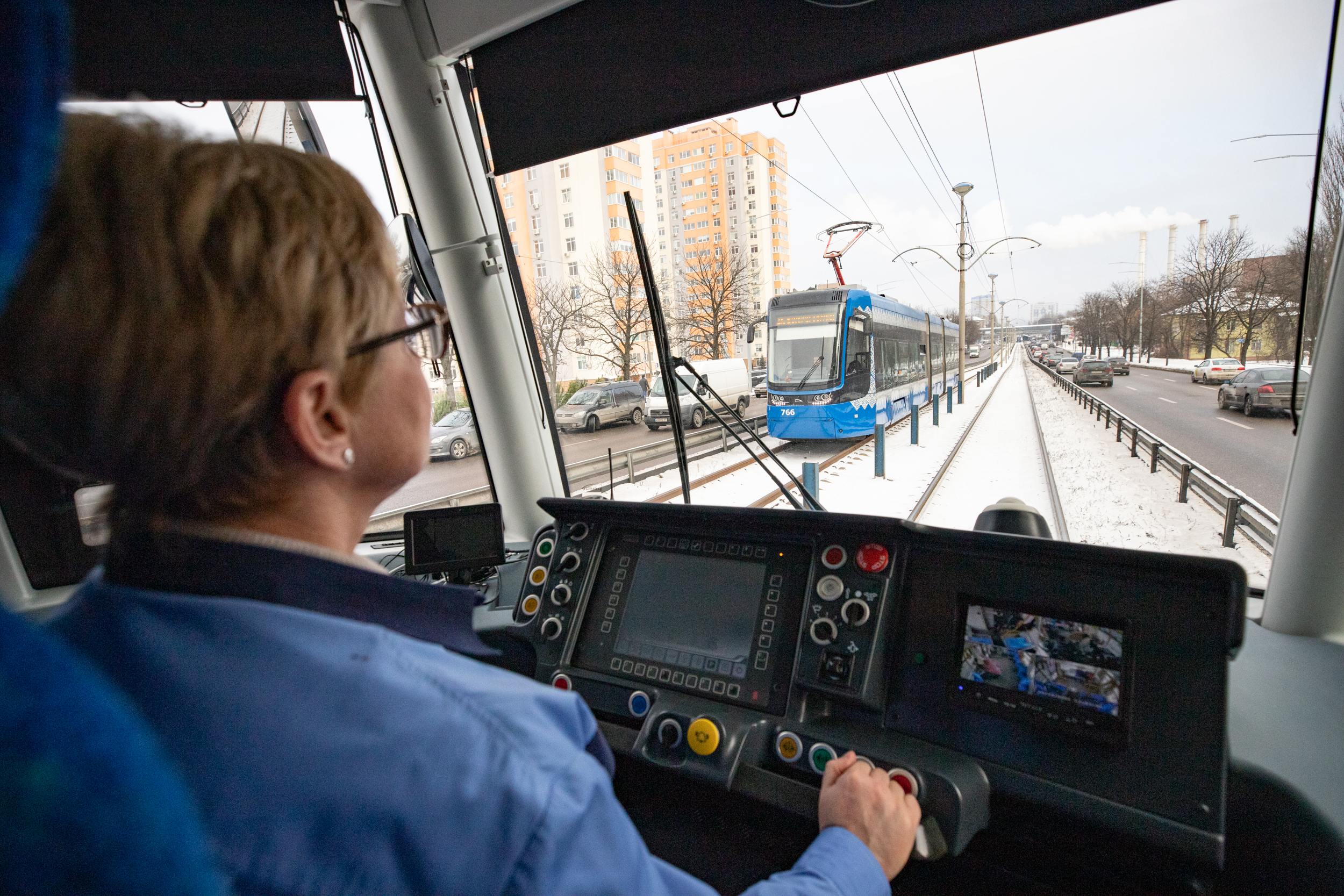
A female tram driver in Kyiv

Women make up 54% of the population of Ukraine and 47.4% of its labor force. Over 60% of all Ukrainian women have higher education (college level and above). However, the unemployment rate of women is very high compared to men with the same educational background (80% of all unemployed in Ukraine are women), not to mention the extensive hidden unemployment among women.

Labor laws establish the legal equality of men and women, including equal pay for equal work, a principle that generally was observed. However, industries dominated by female workers had the lowest relative wages and were the ones most likely to be affected by wage arrears. The retirement age is in the process of being gradually increased, to 60 years for women and 62 years for men-civil servants by 2021 (the original age was 55 for women and 60 for men). There were reports of some employers refusing to hire younger women likely to become pregnant or women over 35. Women also received lower salaries and had limited opportunity for career advancement. Few women held top managerial positions in the government or in state- owned or private industry.

== Women in Ukrainian business ==
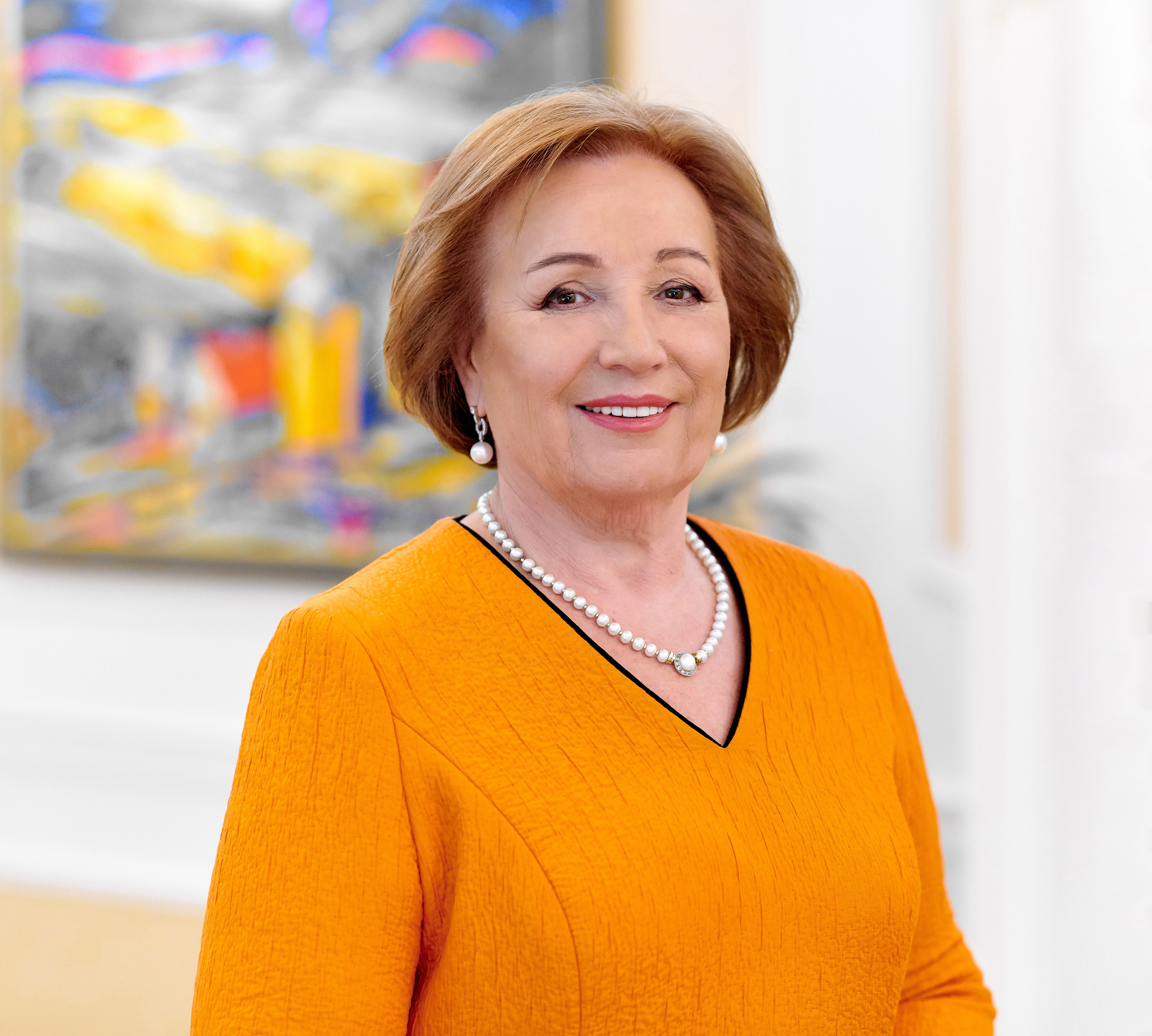
Filia Zhebrovska, Ukrainian businesswoman, head of Farmak supervisory board

On average women earn 30% less than men occupying similar posts.

About 50% of all enterprises without employees are woman owned. Enterprises with 1 to 5 employees are 27% woman owned. Enterprises with less than 50 employees are 30% woman owned. These numbers are similar to those in other Western economies. Women tend to lead small business in retail, wholesale trade and catering. 2% of large companies are headed by women.

In 2008, the women's labour participation rate (LPR) was approximately 62%.

== Women in Ukrainian politics ==
In the 2019 Ukrainian parliamentary election 87 women were elected to parliament, a record for Ukraine, 20.52% of the total number of deputies. In the election about 50% of elected Voice deputies were women, 37% of the elected European Solidarity MP's were women; the least places for women was in Opposition Platform – For Life with 11.4%. In 2014, about 12.1% the Verkhovna Rada (the Ukrainian parliament) were women. From the 2014 parliamentary election to the 2019 election this number increased to 53, that is, 12.6%. The percentage of female lawmakers fluctuates per election. Of the 47 women elected in 2014 to parliament, only 2 achieved this by winning a constituency (the election used a mixed electoral system with 53.2% MP's elected under party lists and 46.8% in 198 constituencies). In 2019, 26 women won a constituency seat. In the parliament elected in the 2012 Ukrainian parliamentary election women made up 9.9% of the parliament. In the first parliamentary election held after 1991's Ukrainian independence held in 1994, only 11 women (2.3% of the parliament) were elected. An Ukrayinska Pravda research published on 12 November 2014 revealed that globally on average 22% of parliament consists of women, while in European Union countries this figure is 25%. According to a study (published on 1 November 2014) by Inter-Parliamentary Union Ukraine is ranked 112th among 189 countries in terms of political representation of women in parliament. Laws to re-implement Soviet-era quota for women in parliament (30% or 35%) have been debated in parliament but not approved.

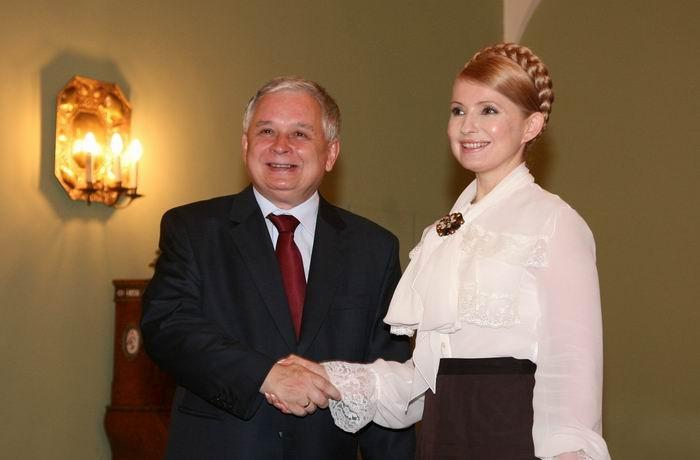
Prime Minister of Ukraine Yulia Tymoshenko and President of Poland Lech Kaczyński (July 2008)

Bloc Yulia Tymoshenko and its successor Batkivshchyna have been the only woman-led party to make it into parliament. Hanna Hopko was first on the party list of Self Reliance, which finished third in the October 2014 Ukrainian parliamentary election. In the same election Nadiya Savchenko was placed first on the party list of Batkivshchyna (the party finished sixth in the election). There have been more woman-led parties in Ukraine and even a few "woman issue" parties (analyst's have described these as "virtual parties designed to steal votes from opposition parties").

The second Yatsenyuk Government (appointed 2 December 2014) had two female ministers. Its predecessor first Yatsenyuk Government (appointed 27 February 2014) had one female minister. The 2016–2019 Groysman government ended his tenure with five female members.

So far the only government that had no female ministers (and was Europe's only government that had no female members in its composition at the time) was the 11 March 2010 appointed first Azarov Government until Raisa Bohatyryova was appointed Minister of Healthcare and Vice Prime Minister of Ukraine on 14 February 2012. Prime Minister Mykola Azarov stated in March 2010 there were no female ministers in this government because "Reforms do not fall into women's competence", while adding that he greatly respects women. Women's groups in Ukraine reported Azarov to the country's ombudsman following this remarks. They accuse him of gender discrimination and holding neanderthal views and did file different Court cases against him. Azorov's consecutive second Azarov Government (that lasted from 24 December 2012 until 27 February 2014) had three female ministers.

During the presidential election of 2010, then candidate Viktor Yanukovych refused to debate his female opponent prime minister Yulia Tymoshenko and justified it by saying that "a woman's place is in the kitchen". (Former) Verkhovna Rada Chairman Volodymyr Lytvyn have also made comments that could be seen as insolent towards women.

A bill banning abortion (written by Andriy Shkil) was registered in the Verkhovna Rada at the request of the clergy of the Greek Catholic Church and the Vatican on 12 March 2012.

== Women in the Ukrainian military ==
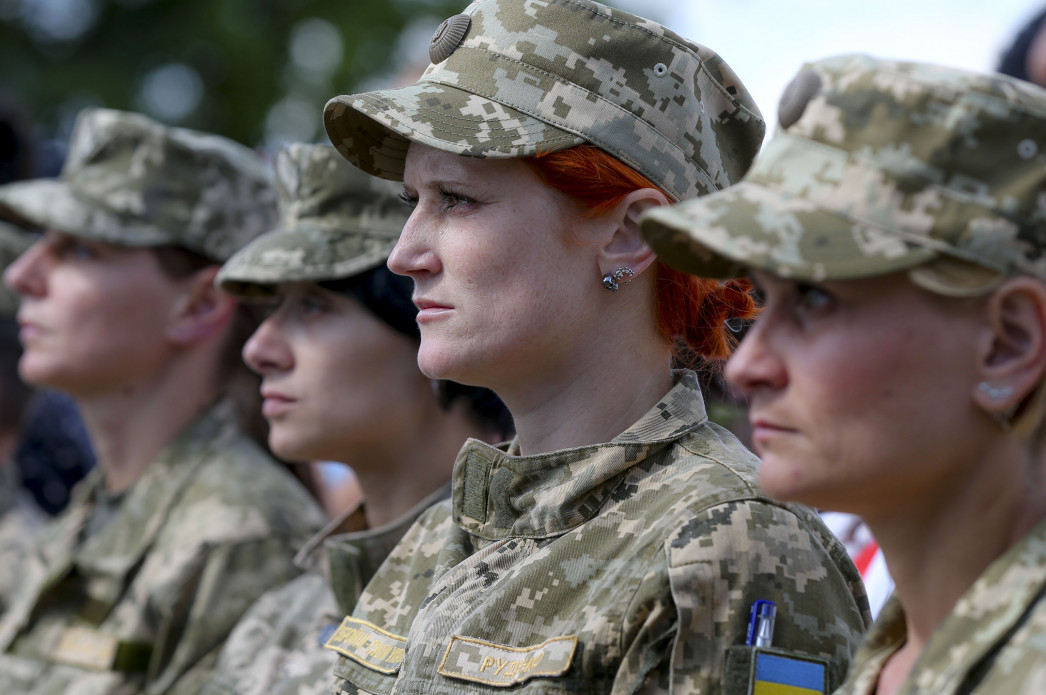
Servicewomen of the Armed Forces of Ukraine

Women in Ukraine are allowed to join the military, but historically this has been limited to non-combatant roles: medic, cook, accountant, etc. As of July 2016, Ukrainian military forces began allowing women to participate in combatant roles including, but not limited to, machine gunner, military scout, and sniper.

== See also ==
- Women in the military by country#Ukraine
- Women in Europe
