= Society of Ukrainian Women =

Ukrainian women's organisation founded in 1884

The Society of Ruthenian Women (Ukrainian: Товариство руських женщин, romanized: Tovarystvo ruskykh zhenshchyn), (Note: Ruthenians was the official designation of ethnic Ukrainians under Austro-Hungarian rule.) since 1922 known as Society of Ukrainian Women (Ukrainian: Товариство українських жінок), was a women's organization in Ukraine, founded in 1884.

The organization was founded by Natalya Kobrynska in Stanislaviv in November 1884. It was essentially a literary discussion club for women. Among the subjects discussed were women's position and rights. It is known as the first women's organization in Ukraine.

== History ==
In November 1884, with the support of Anna Pavlyk and Liudmyla Drahomanova, feminist movement activist and writer Nataliya Kobrynska held the founding meeting of the Society of Ruthenian Women in the "Ruska Besida" (Ukrainian: Руська бесіда) building, Stanislaviv. Olena Kysilevska, Yevhen Zhelekhivsky, and Ivan Franko also attend the founding meeting. At the founding meeting, Ivan Franko delivered a speech, and Dilo published a detailed report of the meeting titled "The First General Meeting of the Ruthenian Women's Society in Stanislaviv" (Ukrainian: Перші загальні збори руського жіночого товариства в Станиславові). The Society aimed to involve intelligent women in literature and popularize new social ideas.

On December 8, 1884, the first general meeting of the Society was held in Stanislaviv. At the meeting, Nataliya Kobrynska was elected the first chairwoman of the Society, and Adelya Zhelekhivska, wife of Yevhen Zhelekhivsky, was elected her deputy. Yevhen Zhelekhivsky was the first chairman of "Prosvita" (Ukrainian: Просвіта, lit. 'Enlightenment').

In 1932 the society became part of the Ukrainian Women's Union.

== Members ==
The list of members of the "Society of Ruthenian Women" as of 1884 is presented with the original spelling preserved:

1. Nataliya Kobrynska
2. Zhelekhivska Adelya
3. Ostermanova Ivanna
4. Nychaivna Emilia
5. Abrysovska Yulia
6. Abrysovska Ivanna
7. Buchynska Minodora
8. Buchynska Zofia
9. Burachynska Maria
10. Tsetsyliia Kurovets
11. Chernetska Olena
12. Chernetska Vlada
13. Tselevicheva Vanda
14. Dombchevska Leontyna Stanislaviv
15. Hromadkova Pavlina
16. Hankevich Olga
17. Horodyska Anastasia
18. Horodyska Teodora
19. Goshovska Olga
20. Yatsykevicheva Evgenia
21. Kurylovich Klyavdiya
22. Krasitska Olga
23. Klyuchenkova
24. Litvynovych Kamilla
25. Litvynovych Natalia
26. Lazarska Ivanna
27. Lopushynska Mykhailyna
28. Levytska Ivanna
29. Levytska Maria
30. Levytska Olga
31. Levytska Anna
32. Levytska Olga
33. Malytska Olena
34. Navrocka Teklia
35. Ozarkevich Olga
36. Ozarkevich Jeronima
37. Okunevska Emilia
38. Porayko Yevheniya
39. Rakovska Yosyfa
40. Rainerovicheva Matilda
41. Shankovska Yosyfa
42. Shankovska Elena
43. Shankovska Favstina
44. Stefanovicheva Teodora
45. Semenova Yevheniya
46. Olena Kysilevska
47. Sosnovska Maria
48. Shchurovska Stefaniya
49. Shukhevych Olga
50. Tovsta Teklia
51. Tretyakivna Olga
52. Tracheva Natalia
53. Vinnytska Kateryna
54. Vytoshynska Euphrosyne
55. Vytoshynska Sabina
56. Vretsona Julia
57. Zarytska Pavlina
58. Hamorak Anna
59. Popovych Maria
60. Popovych Klementyna-Boyarska
61. Kalynovych Antona
62. Tanchakivska Yevheniya
63. Sovanska Pavlina
64. Hrytsey Natalia
65. Levytska Yevheniya
66. Navrocka Elena
67. Navrocka Karolina
68. Dudykevych Evgeniya
69. Dudykevych Elena
70. Novosad Maria
71. Lysynetska Klementyna
72. Luchakivska Amalia
73. Shankovska Agrippina
74. Sabatova Emilia
75. Navrocka Maria
76. Navrocka Ivanna
77. Navrocka Oleksandra
78. Kocherkevych Emilia
79. Kysilevska Elena
80. Korzhanska Olga-Milana
81. Morovyk Anna
82. Zbudowska Maria
83. Zbudowska Leontina
84. Konyska Yevgeniya
85. Konstantinovych Antonina
86. Konstantinovych Anna
87. Bobykevych Amalia
88. Bodnar Maria
89. Vengrinovych Yosyfa
90. Lukasevich Elena
91. Hamorak Olena
92. Luhova Cetsiliya
93. Yanovych Klementyna
94. Odizhynska Olena
