= Olena Kysilevska =

Ukrainian journalist, senator

Olena Lvivna Kysilevska
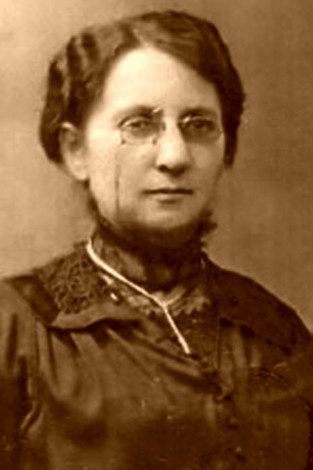
- Born: Olena Simenovych; 24 March 1869; Monastyryska, Austro-Hungarian Empire
- Died: 29 March 1956 (aged 93); Ottawa, Ontario, Canada
- Occupations: Activist, journalist, writer, senator
- Children: Vladimir Kaye-Kysilewsky (son)
- Father: Lev Simenovich

Olena Kysilevska or Olena Kysilewska (1869–1956) was a Ukrainian social activist, journalist and writer. She was a senator (1928-1935) on behalf of the Ukrainian National Democratic Union (UNDO) party.

== Life and work ==
Olena was born 24 March 1869 in Monastyryska, Buchach County, Galicia, Austro-Hungarian Empire, into the family of a priest of the Ukrainian Greek Catholic Church Fr. Lev Simenovich. She spent her childhood in the village of Filvarky (now Pidhorodne), which is now united with the town of Monastyryska. After the death of her father-priest, she entered the Vidylov School in Stanislaviv (now Ivano-Frankivsk) in 1884. She became active in the women's movement in Galicia, joining the Tovarystvo Rus'kykh Zhinok (Association of Ukrainian Women) which had been founded in 1884 by Natalia Kobrynska.

=== Writer ===
Kysilevska began publishing short stories and articles on education and women's rights in almanacs and journals in 1910, and from 1912 she edited a women's page in the newspaper Dilo. During World War I, she was a member of the Red Cross relief committee for prisoners of war and the wounded in Vienna, Austria. After the war, she became a member of the executive of the Union of Ukrainian Women in Lviv.

For many years, (1925–1939) she published and edited the semimonthly Zhinocha dolia in Kolomyia. She traveled extensively throughout Western Europe and North America (1924), participating in the international women's movement and organizing Ukrainian women's organizations. Several of these trips were described in her travelogues Letters from the Black Sea Coast (1939) and Around My Native Land (1951).

=== Senator ===
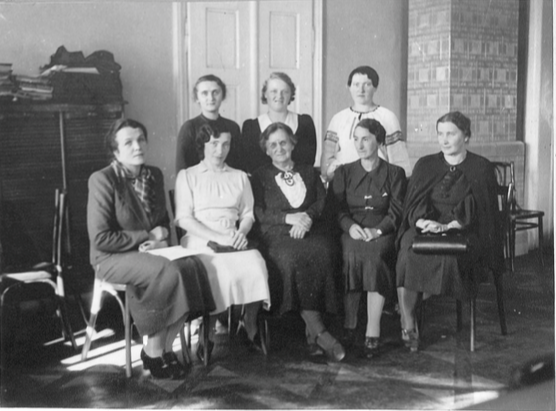
The agricultural instructors. Standing at rear left to right: Oksana Duchyminska, Kharytya Kononenko, Maria [?]. Seated in front from left to right: Irena Pavlykovska, Olena Shtogryn (from America), Olena Kiselivska, Irena Dombchevska and Olena Stepaniv-Dashkevych.

Kysilevska was an active member of the Ukrainian National Democratic Alliance and was elected to two terms in the Polish Senate (1928–1935). From 1935 on, she headed the women's section of the Silskyi Hospodar society in Lviv. Silskyi Hospodar had been founded in 1899 and it was the most important agriculture organisation in Galicia. Others involved were Iryna Pavlykovska, Kharyta Kononenko and I. Dombchevska.

As a result of the Second World War, Kysilevska lived as a displaced person in Northern Europe until she immigrated to Canada in 1948 to join her son Vladimir Kaye-Kysilewsky, a historian, journalist and publisher. That same year Olena was elected the first president of the World Federation of Ukrainian Women's Organizations, a position she held until her death. The organisation created the first links of women's organisations across the Ukrainian diaspora. The 1948 list was the UNWLA, the Ukrainian Gold Cross, the Olha Basarab Organization of Ukrainian Women in Canada; the League of Ukrainian Catholic Women in Canada; the Association of Ukrainian Women in Germany; the Organization of Ukrainian Women of Great Britain; the Union of Ukrainian Women in Belgium; the Soiuz Ukrainok in France; the Women's Organization of Brazil; the Soiuz Ukrainok of Argentina; the Union of Ukrainian Women of Venezuela and the Soiuz Ukrainok.

=== Death ===
Kysilevska died 29 March 1956 in Ottawa, Ontario, Canada.

== Archives ==
- Kysilevska's personal archives (works of art, articles, sketches and memoirs) are held at the Library and Archives Canada in Ottawa as The Olena Kysilevska Collection (1985), published by the Canadian Institute of Ukrainian Studies.
- Her work can also be found at Harvard's Ukrainian Research Institute within the archives, HOLLIS 009497096. Correspondence found there "sheds light on the publishing activities of Olena Kysilevska, president of the World Federation of Ukrainian Women’s Organizations (1948-1956)."
