= Martha Bohachevsky-Chomiak =

Ukrainian-born American writer, historian

- Марта Богачевська-Хомяк
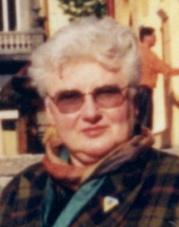
- Bohachevsky-Chomiak in 1999
- Born: 24 June 1938; Sokal, Poland (now Ukraine)
- Occupations: historian, feminist activist
- Known for: research on Ukrainian feminesm
- Awards: Order of Princess Olga, 3rd Class

Martha Bohachevsky-Chomiak (Ukrainian: Марта Богаче́вська-Хомя́к; born 1938 in Sokal, Second Polish Republic) is a Ukrainian and American historian and Ukrainian feminist activist.

== Personal life ==
Martha Danylivna Bohachevsky-Chomiak was born on 24 June 1938 in Sokal in Poland, now Lviv Oblast of Ukraine.

== Academic career and activism ==
Since the 1940s, she has lived in the United States. She graduated from college in New York. In 1960, she graduated from the University of Pennsylvania and in 1961 she graduated from Columbia University with a doctorate in the history of Russian philosophical thought of the nineteenth century.

From 1964 to 1968, she taught Eastern European history at leading US universities; later, she became a professor of history at universities in New York, New Jersey, Washington, and Harvard University. Since 1968, she has been a professor at Manhattanville College. She was on a research trip to Poland (1976–1977), then to Kyiv, researching the history of the Ukrainian feminist movement.

She taught history in universities in New York, Washington, New Jersey, Harvard as well as the National University of Kyiv-Mohyla Academy. She was a director of the Fulbright Program at George Washington University. For scientific achievements, she received the Heldt Prize (1988) and the Antonovich Foundation Prize (1990). She is a member of the Shevchenko Scientific Society in Lviv and former vice-president of the Ukrainian National Women's League of America. On 28 November 2006, Bohachevsky-Chomiak received the Order of Princess Olga, 3rd Class.
