= Beleluia =

Rural locality in Ivano-Frankivsk Oblast, Ukraine

Beleluia Белелуя
- Village
- Location in Ivano-Frankivsk Oblast
- Coordinates: 48°29′55″N 25°28′39″E
- Country: Ukraine
- Oblast: Ivano-Frankivsk Oblast
- Raion: Kolomyia Raion
- Hromada: Sniatyn urban hromada
- Time zone: UTC+2 (EET)
  - Summer (DST): UTC+3 (EEST)
- Postal code: 78332

Beleluia (Ukrainian: Белелуя) is a village in the Sniatyn urban hromada of the Kolomyia Raion of Ivano-Frankivsk Oblast in Ukraine.

The traditional Malanka ritual of the village of Beleluia is inscribed on the National Register of Elements of Intangible Cultural Heritage of Ukraine.

== History ==
On 19 July 2020, as a result of the administrative-territorial reform and liquidation of the Sniatyn Raion, the village became part of the Kolomyia Raion.

== Notable residents ==
- Nataliya Kobrynska (1851–1920), Ukrainian writer, socialist feminist, and activist from Austria-Hungary

== Sources ==
- "Bełełuja". Geographical Dictionary of the Kingdom of Poland (in Polish). 1. Warszawa: Kasa im. Józefa Mianowskiego. 1880. p. 128.
