= Volodymyr Hnatiuk =

Ukrainian ethnographer (1871–1926)

Volodymyr Hnatiuk Володимир Гнатюк
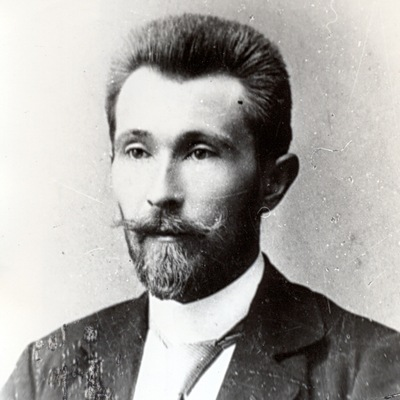
- Volodymyr Hnatiuk
- Born: May 9, 1871; Velesniv, Galicia, Austria-Hungary
- Died: October 6, 1926 (aged 55); Lwów, Poland (now Lviv, Ukraine)
- Occupations: ethnographer, writer, literary scholar, translator, and journalist
- Writing career
- Language: Ukrainian
- Notable awards: Kotliarevsky’ Award of the Russian Academy of Sciences

Volodymyr Mykhailovych Hnatiuk (Ukrainian: Володимир Михайлович Гнатюк; 9 May 1871 – 6 October 1926) was a writer, literary scholar, translator, journalist, and one of the most influential and notable Ukrainian ethnographers. He was a close companion of Mykhailo Hrushevsky and Ivan Franko. Hnatiuk focused primarily on West Ukraine, gathering information about folk songs, legends, customs and dialects. He served as secretary of the Shevchenko Scientific Society (1899), editing “The Ukrainian Historical Journal”, and was a member of the Russian Academy of Sciences (1902) and National Academy of Sciences of Ukraine (1924). He was also the director of the Ukrainian Union of publishing.

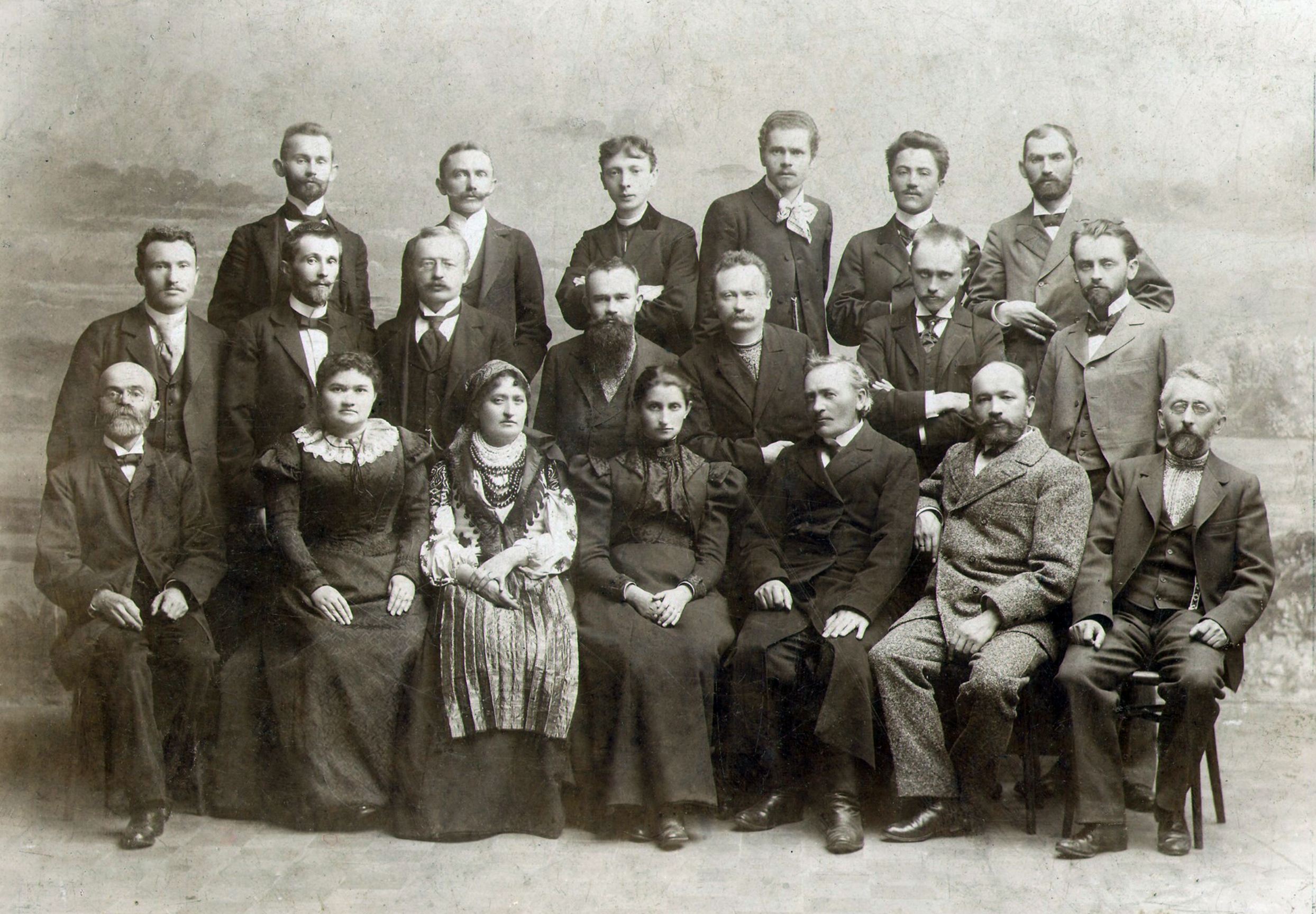
The board and members of the Shevchenko Scientific Society celebrating the 100th anniversary of the publication of Ivan Kotliarevsky's Eneida, Lviv, 31 October 1898: Sitting in the first row: Mykhaylo Pavlyk, Yevheniya Yaroshynska, Natalia Kobrynska, Olha Kobylianska, Sylvester Lepky, Andriy Chaykovsky, Kost Pankivsky. In the second row: Ivan Kopach, Volodymyr Hnatiuk, Osyp Makovej, Mykhailo Hrushevsky, Ivan Franko, Oleksander Kolessa, Bohdan Lepky. Standing in the third row: Ivan Petrushevych, Filaret Kolessa, Yossyp Kyshakevych, Ivan Trush, Denys Lukianovych, Mykola Ivasyuk.

== Biography ==
Volodymyr Hnatiuk was born on May 9, 1871, in Velesniv, Buchach powiat, Galicia (now located in Ternopil Oblast, Ukraine). He studied in the Buchach and Stanislavska high school and University of Lviv.

Even in the years of training he to study seriously folklore and ethnography. His first scientific works were published in the magazine "Life and Word", "The Nation", and other, in those period.

He studied folk art in close contact with the socio-economic conditions of workers. Hnatiuk systematically made a note of folklore in Eastern Galicia from 1893 to 1902. In 1859-1903 he investigated six folklore and ethnographic expeditions to Transcarpathian Ukraine. He wrote down about 1500 folk songs, composed a few selected works such as “Kolomiyka” (Ukrainian dance and song) in 3 parts, 1905-1907, "Hayivka" (1909), and "Carols and songs" (1914).

Hnatiuk died in Lviv on October 6, 1926. He was buried at the Lychakiv Cemetery in Lviv.

== Research activities ==
When he was a freshman at University of Lviv he took an interest in the folklore of residents of the southern slopes of the Carpathians.

The first study "Lyrists: lyrist, prayers, words, news and others facts about lyrists of Buchach district" was published in 1896.

Personally conducted by Ivan Franko he edited the ethnographic collection "Materials for Ukrainian Ethnology". He published a number of scientific publications about Lemkos and Ruthenians.

There were further works such as:

- «Ruski in Bachtsya» (1898),
- «Ruthenians in Hungary» (1899),
- «Ruthenians of the Pryashiv eparchy and their dialect» (1900),
- «Slovaks or Ruthenians» (1901).

He edited the works of the Ukrainian and foreign authors, translated into Ukrainian, Bulgarian, Polish, Russian, Serbian, Czech, Swedish and other literatures. The collected materials are celebrated for accuracy of record and have great importance for the further study of culture and life of Ukrainian, especially of Carpathian residents.

A regular network for the collection of ethnographic and folkloristic materials was created by him.

Numerous works on comparative ethnography, linguistics, literary criticism, organizing and publishing folkloristic materials, were also created by Volodymyr Hnatiuk.

He actively corresponded with Ivan Franko, Borys Hrinchenko, Mykola Voronyi, Bohdan Lepky, Mykhailo Pavlyk, Antin Krushelnytskyi, Ivan Nechuy-Levytsky, and others.

In 30 years of researching and publishing, Volodymyr Hnatiuk published about a thousand different works. He was the first to push the Ukrainian folklore on the wide path of European science.

I. Franko named Volodymyr Hnatiuk a "phenomenally lucky collector of all ethnographic material in which, among our older collectors, apparently, no one did believe."

== Works ==
Among the works of Hnatiuk are:

- "Ethnographic material from Hungarian Ruthenia"
- "Galician-Ruthenian folk legend"
- "Kolomyyky"
- "Hayivkas"
- "People's stories about opryshky»
- "Carols and songs"
- "Ukrainian folk tales"
- "National revival of Austro-Hungarian Ukrainian"
- "People's stories"
- "Folk tales"
- "How the world was BC. Folk legends from the history of nature and human life "
- "Burning and swimming of witches in Galicia "

== Honouring ==
- The Volodymyr Hnatiuk Museum in Velesniv.
- Ternopil Volodymyr Hnatiuk National Pedagogical University in Ternopil is named after him.
- A gymnasium in Buchach was named after him.

== Sources ==
- Mykola Mushynka. Hnatiuk, Volodymyr: Encyclopedia of Ukraine, vol. 2 (1989).
