= Mykola Ivasyuk =

Ukrainian painter

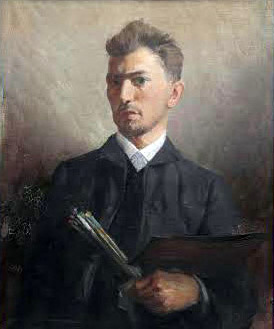
Self-portrait (1887)

Mykola Ivanovych Ivasyuk (Ukrainian: Мико́ла Іва́нович Івасю́к: 28 July 1865, Zastavna, Duchy of Bukovina, Austrian Empire — 25 November 1937, Kyiv, Soviet Union) was a Ukrainian realist painter from Bukovina. He specialized in history painting, but is also known for his postage stamp designs. After moving to Soviet Ukraine during the 1920s, Ivasyuk became a victim of political repressions and was executed during the Great Purge.

== Biography ==
His father was a carpenter. At the time of his birth, Zastavna, Duchy of Bukovina was part of Austrian Empire (the Austro-Hungarian Empire two years later). Due to this his primary education was conducted in German and Romanian. For his secondary studies, he went to Chernivtsi. One of his instructors there was the Ukrainian artist Yustyn Pigulyak, who discovered and encouraged his talent for art by giving him free lessons. Before long, he had decided to become a history painter. In 1884, he was able to gain admission to the Academy of Fine Arts, Vienna.

While there, he participated in student excursions to the Ternopil region, where he became acquainted with the nobleman, Volodyslav Fyodorovych and painted portraits of his family. After graduating, he was recommended to the Academy of Fine Arts, Munich, to complete his education. While there, he met the Russian artist, Ilya Repin, who advised him to establish himself in Kyiv.

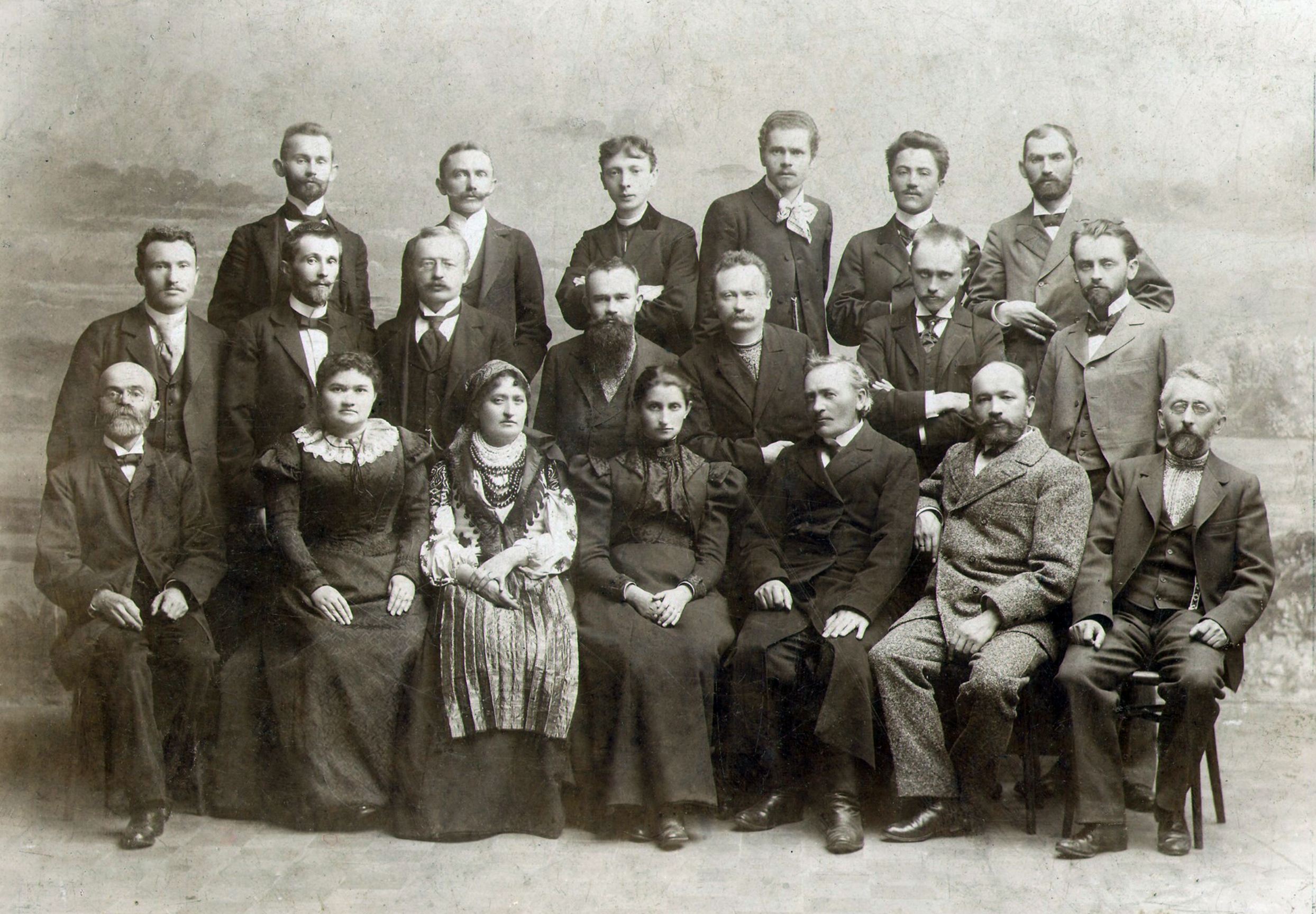
The board and members of the Shevchenko Scientific Society celebrating the 100th anniversary of the publication of Ivan Kotliarevsky's Eneida, Lviv, 31 October 1898: Sitting in the first row: Mykhaylo Pavlyk, Yevheniya Yaroshynska, Natalia Kobrynska, Olha Kobylianska, Sylvester Lepky, Andriy Chaykovsky, Kost Pankivsky. In the second row: Ivan Kopach, Volodymyr Hnatiuk, Osyp Makovej, Mykhailo Hrushevsky, Ivan Franko, Oleksander Kolessa, Bohdan Lepky. Standing in the third row: Ivan Petrushevych, Filaret Kolessa, Yossyp Kyshakevych, Ivan Trush, Denys Lukianovych, Mykola Ivasyuk.

He held his first exhibition in Chernivtsi, where he displayed genre works as well as historical scenes. In 1899, he established a school there for "talented but poor youth", which he operated until 1908, when he took Repin's advice about Kyiv. Just prior to World War I, however, the government of Bukovina offered him the sum of 1000 Crowns to establish another art school in Chernivtsi, so he returned. He also opened a workshop for icon painting. It was there that he executed his most famous work, The Entrance of Bohdan Khmelnytsky to Kyiv in 1649, a reproduction of which was once a common sight in Ukrainian homes. As a supporter of Ukrainian independence, he created many similar paintings, but most of them were lost years later when he once again went to Kyiv.

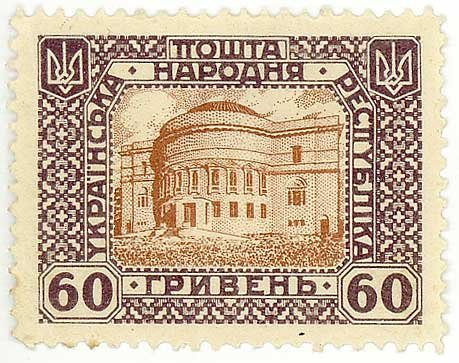
₴60 postage stamp

In 1919, the Directorate of Ukraine commissioned him to design postage stamps for the Ukrainian People's Republic. He produced fourteen designs altogether and they were printed in 1921 but, shortly after, the Soviets took control of Ukraine and they were never used.

In 1926 Vlas Chubar, Chairman of the People's Commissariat of Ukraine, invited him and his student, Evzebiy Lipetskiy, to become professors at the Kyiv Art Institute. Lipetskiy was wary of the Soviets and refused the offer; advising Ivasyuk to do the same. He accepted, however, and moved his family there the same year. They were immediately granted Soviet citizenship.

At first, he was honored and praised but soon, following instructions from Moscow, he began to be criticized; initially for small things, then for more serious matters. Eventually, he was transferred to Odessa, where he came under harsh criticism for "bourgeois deviations". Finally, it was forbidden to mention his name. In September, 1937, the NKVD conducted a search of his apartment and found nothing incriminating. He was arrested, nevertheless, and taken to Lukyanivska Prison.

The following month, he was formally accused of being a terrorist and an agent of German intelligence. He refused to confess. In November, he was convicted and, eleven days later, executed by firing squad. All of his personal property was confiscated and destroyed. His remains were returned to Bukovina. He was rehabilitated in 1980.

== Selected paintings ==
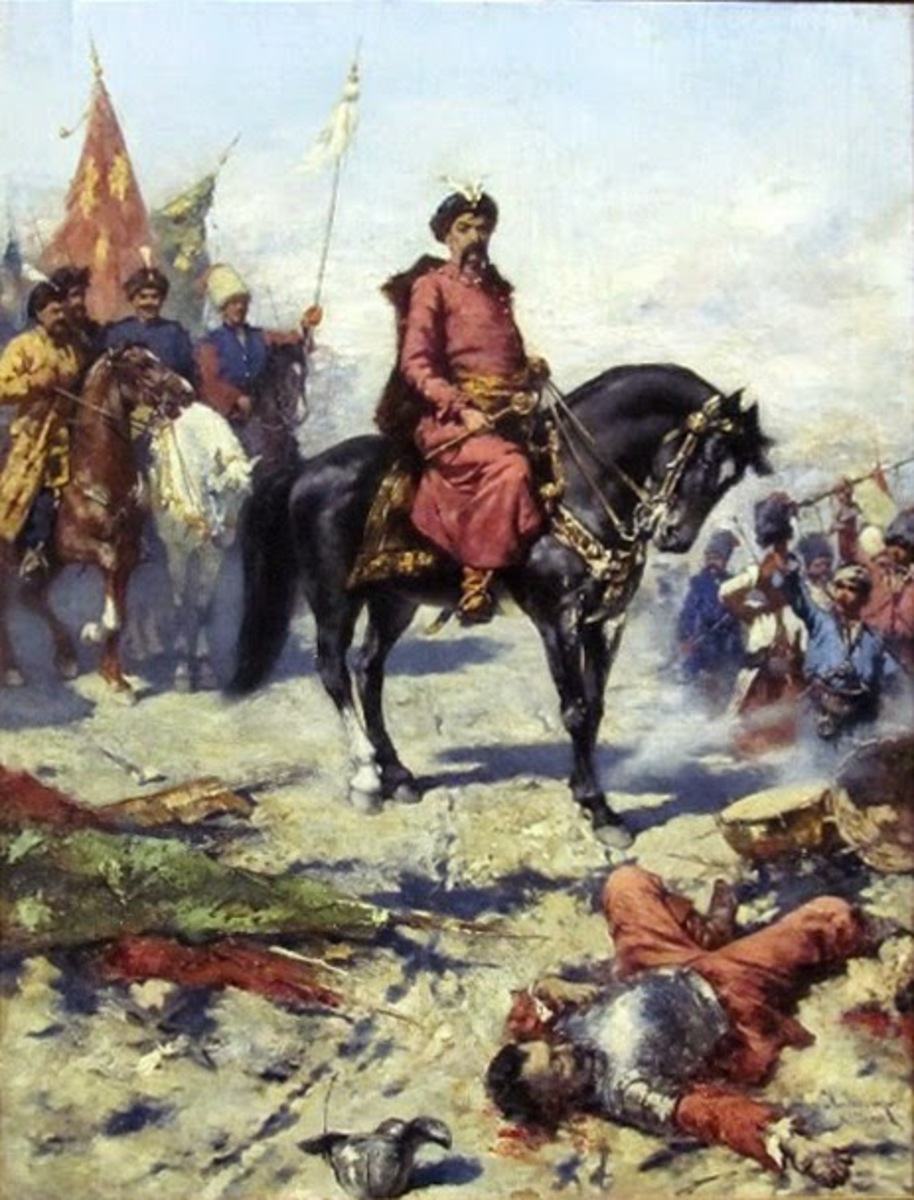
Bohdan Khmelnytsky
in Battle

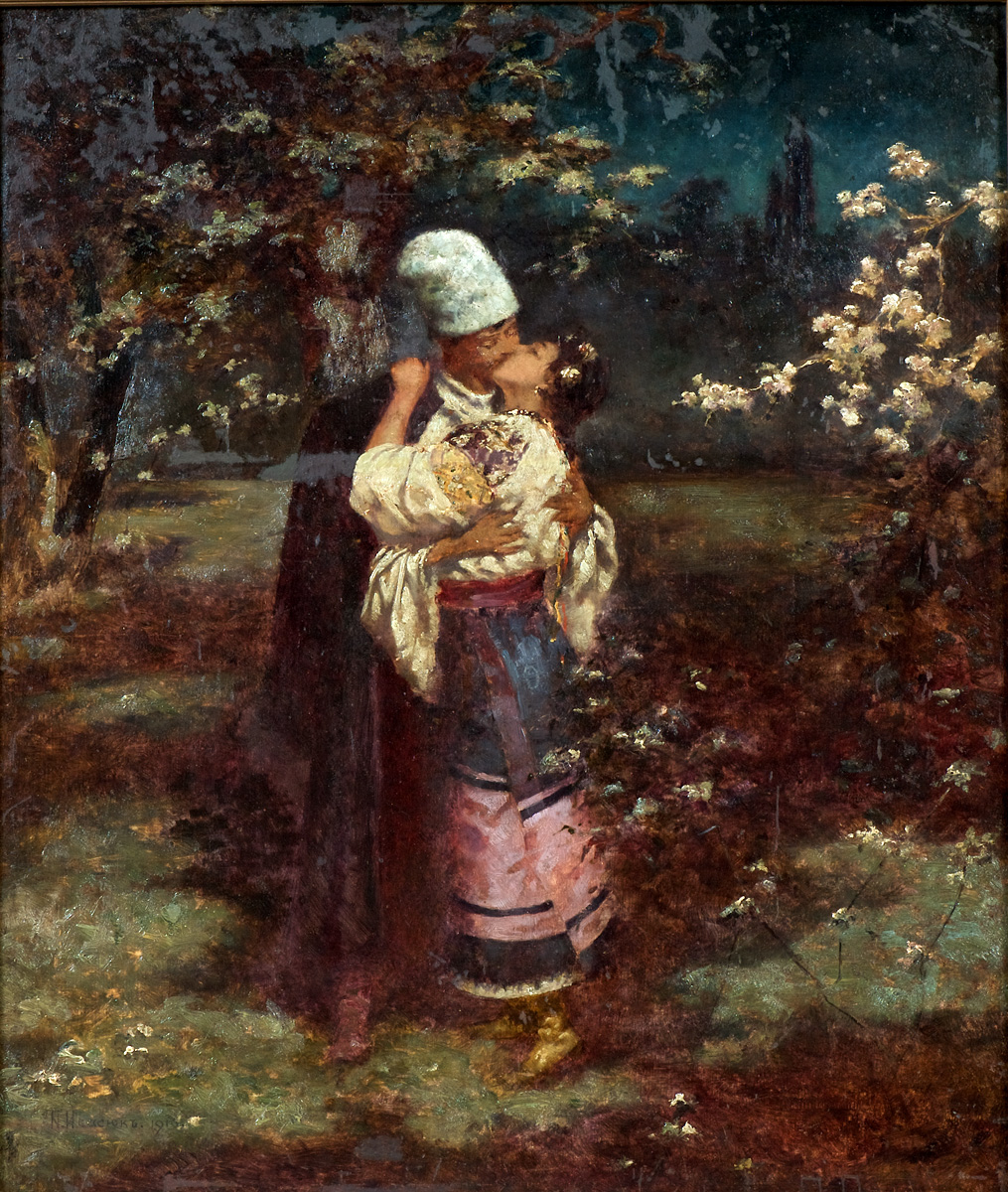
The Kiss

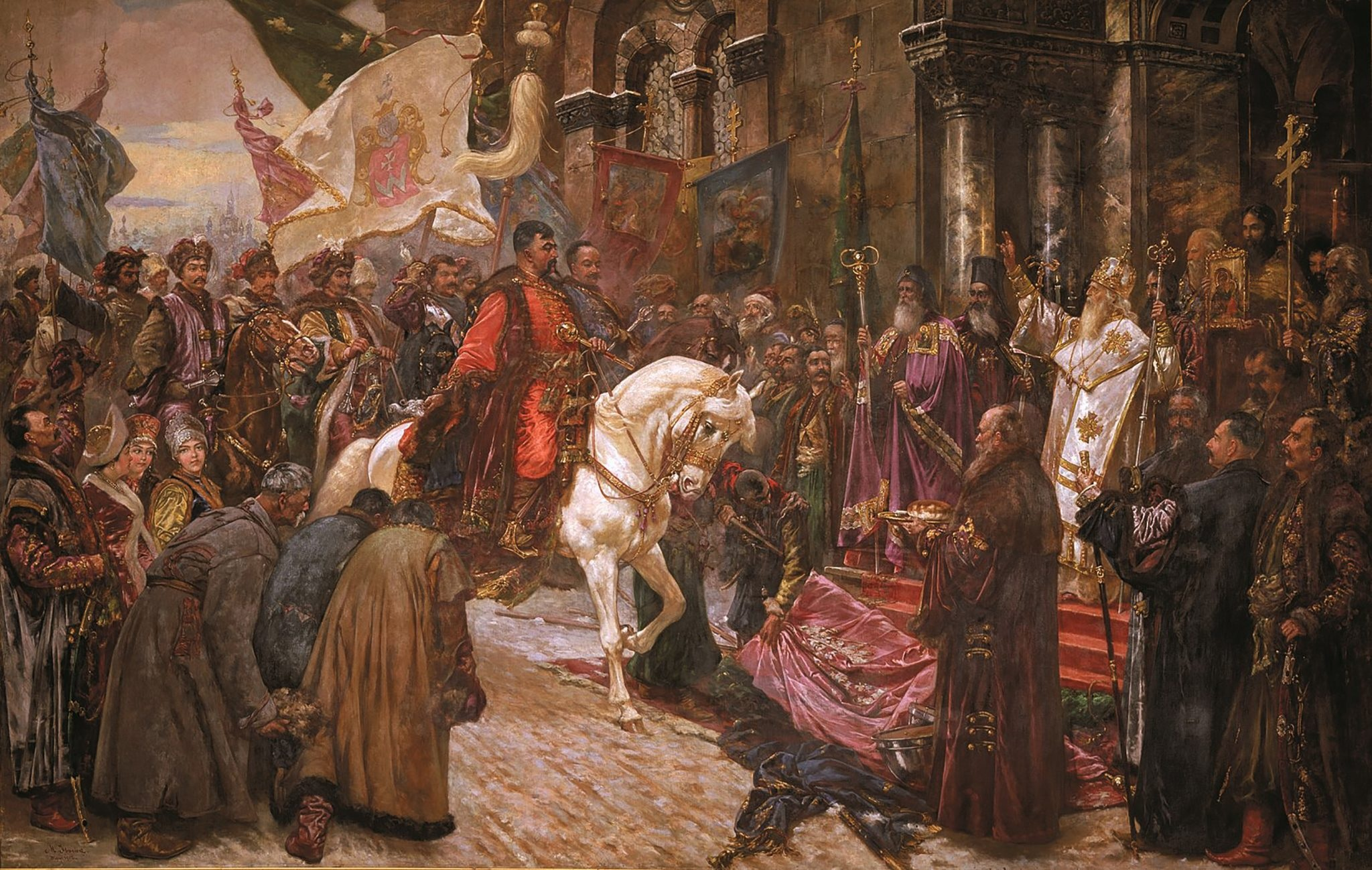
The Entrance of Bohdan Khmelnytsky
to Kyiv in 1649

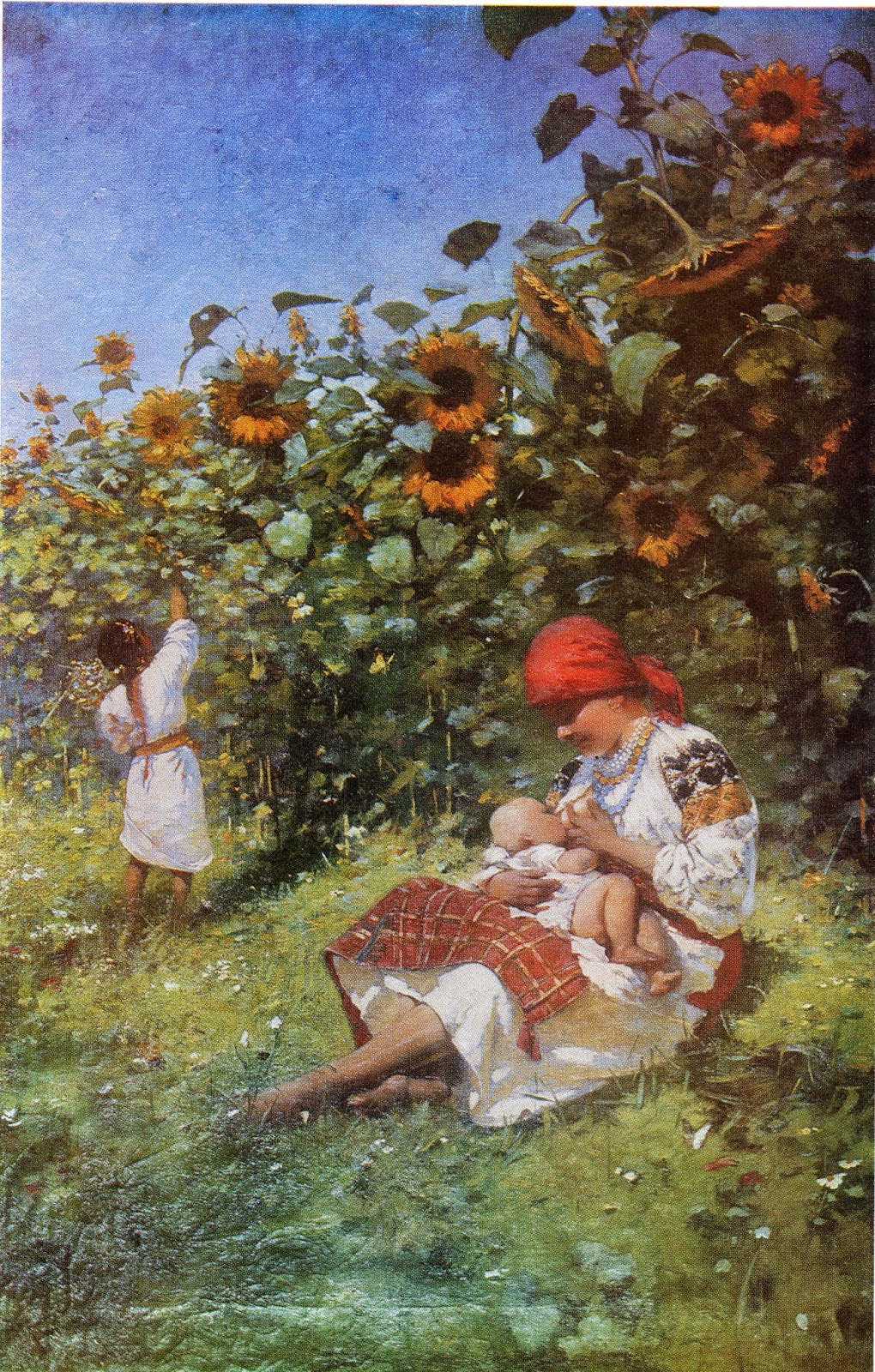
The Mother

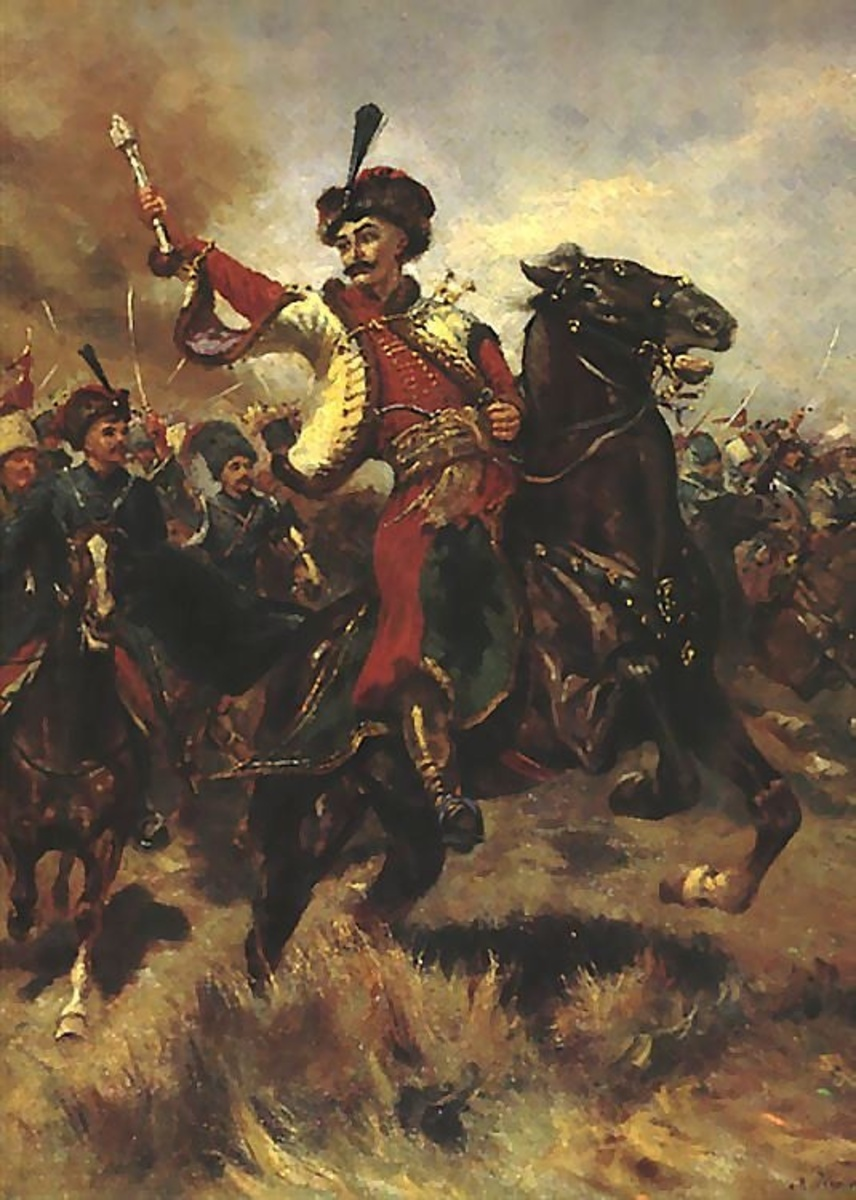
Ivan Bohun at the Battle of Beresteczko
