= Yevheniya Yaroshynska =

Ukrainian educator, writer and activist

- Євгенія Іванівна Ярошинська
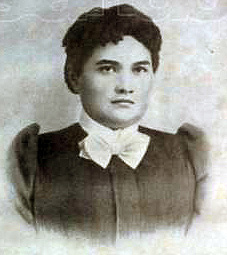
- Born: 1868; Bukovina province, Austria-Hungary
- Died: 1904 (aged 35–36)
- Occupations: Educator, writer, activist
- Notable work: Bukovinian folk songs, articles on Ukrainian culture, stories

Yevheniya Yaroshynska (Ukrainian: Євгенія Іванівна Ярошинська; 1868–1904) was a Ukrainian educator, writer and activist.

== Biography ==
She was born in Bukovina, in Western Ukraine, at that time part of Austria-Hungary. Because German was the official language at the time, her first stories were written in German. After a Ukrainian newspaper was established in her region, she began to read Ukrainian authors and to study the local folklore. She wrote down the lyrics to 450 Bukovinian folk songs. In 1888, she began writing articles on Ukrainian culture for Ukrainian, German and Czech periodicals. Two years later, she began writing stories in Ukrainian and translating literature into Ukrainian. She studied to become a teacher and received her certificate in 1896. She also became involved in the women's movement in Ukraine.

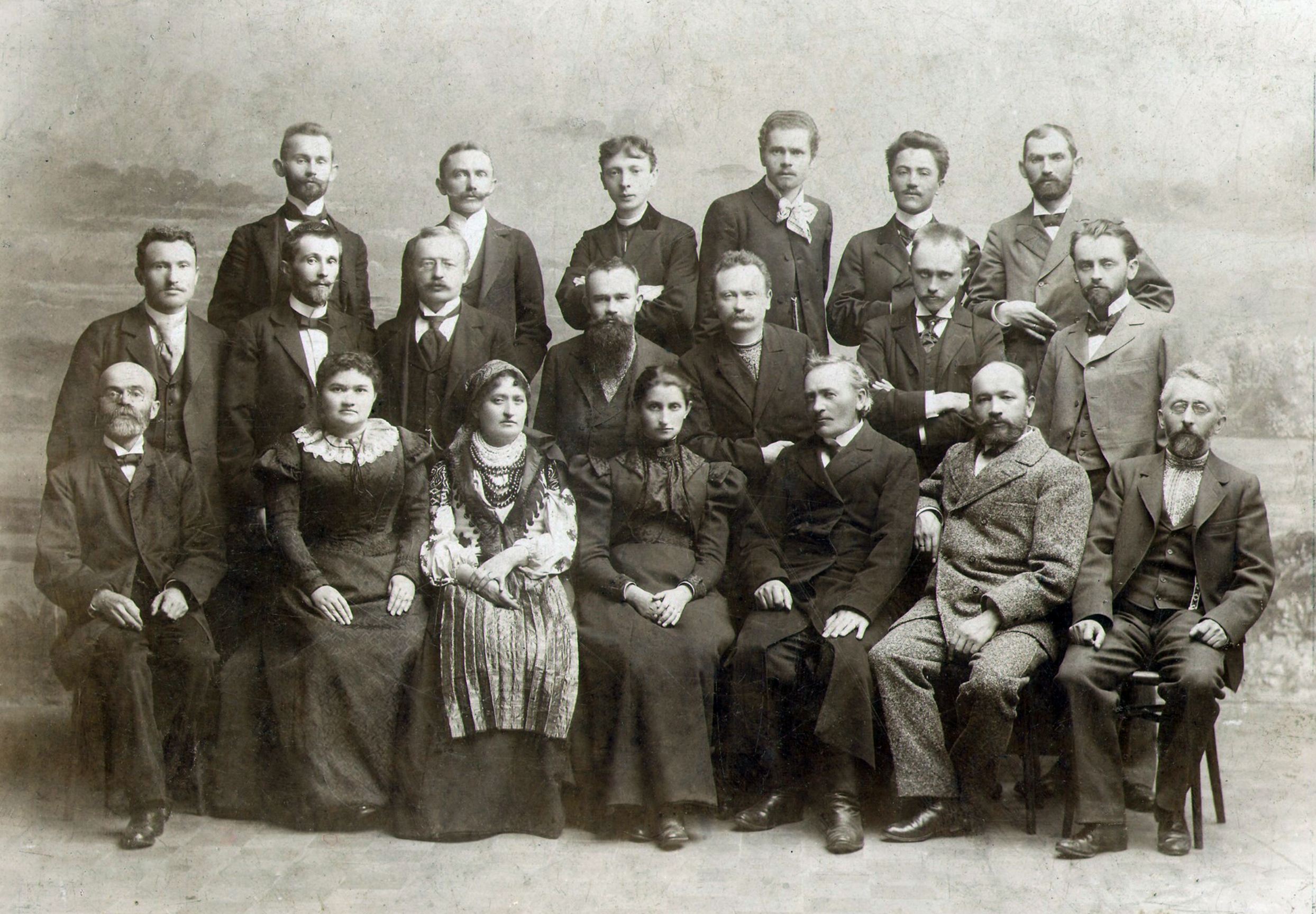
The board and members of the Shevchenko Scientific Society celebrating the 100th anniversary of the publication of Ivan Kotliarevsky's Eneida, Lviv, 31 October 1898: Sitting in the first row: Mykhaylo Pavlyk, Yevheniya Yaroshynska, Natalia Kobrynska, Olha Kobylianska, Sylvester Lepky, Andriy Chaykovsky, Kost Pankivsky. In the second row: Ivan Kopach, Volodymyr Hnatiuk, Osyp Makovej, Mykhailo Hrushevsky, Ivan Franko, Oleksander Kolessa, Bohdan Lepky. Standing in the third row: Ivan Petrushevych, Filaret Kolessa, Yossyp Kyshakevych, Ivan Trush, Denys Lukianovych, Mykola Ivasyuk.

Yaroshynska contributed to the almanac Nasha dolya (Our fate), which was edited by Nataliya Kobrynska.

She took a weaving course and then taught peasant women this craft to allow them to generate more income for their households. She also formed reading clubs where she read newspapers to peasants to help keep them aware of current affairs.

Her work was translated to English for the collection But... The Lord is Silent (1999).
