= Olha Kobylianska =

Ukrainian writer and feminist

- Ольга Кобилянська
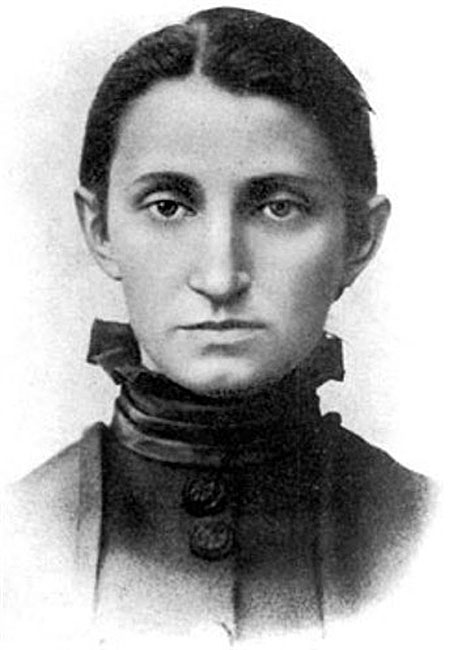
- Kobylianska in 1899
- Born: 27 November 1863; Gura Humorului, Austro-Hungary
- Died: 21 March 1942 (aged 78); Cernăuți, Romania
- Citizenship: Cisleithania (before 1918); West Ukrainian People's Republic (1918); Kingdom of Romania (1918–1940); Soviet Union (1940–1942)
- Occupations: Writer; feminist

Olha Yulianivna Kobylianska (Ukrainian: Ольга Юліанівна Кобилянська, [ˈɔlʲɦɐ jʊlʲiˈanʲiu̯nɐ kobeˈlʲanʲsʲkɐ]; 27 November 1863 – 21 March 1942) was a Ukrainian modernist writer, nationalist and feminist. A daughter of a Ukrainian nobleman and a Polonized German mother, Kobylianska was mainly self-educated, receiving only four years of formal schooling in the German language. She wrote her first works in German, beginning in 1880. Besides her fluency in German, she learned to speak in both the Ukrainian and Polish languages. In 1898, she published a pioneering treatment of same-sex love, based partly on her own lesbian experiences. Following the annexation of Bukovina to Soviet Ukraine, Kobylianska adopted Soviet citizenship, which resulted in her persecution following the return of Romanian authorities.

== Biography ==
=== Origin ===
Kobylianska was born in Gura Humorului (German: Gura-Humora) in Bukovina (now in Suceava County, Romania) in the family of a minor administration worker of Ukrainian noble descent from Central Ukraine. She was the fourth child of seven in the family of Maria Werner (1837–1912) and Yulian Yakovych Kobyliansky (1827–1912). One of her distant relatives was the German poet Zacharias Werner. Maria Werner was a Polonized German who was baptized a Greek Catholic and learned the local dialect of the Ukrainian language. One of Olha's brothers, Stepan Yulianovych, became a painter-portraitist, another, Yulian Yulianovych, became a philologist and was the author of several textbooks in Latin.

=== Early days ===
Kobylianska was mainly self-educated, receiving only four years of formal schooling in the German language. She wrote her first works in German, beginning in 1880. Besides a proficiency in German she spoke Ukrainian as well as Polish. Sometime in 1868, she moved with her family to Suceava where her father accepted a job. There she met with Olha Ustyianovych, the daughter of Ukrainian writer Mykola Ustyianovych. In 1889, she moved to her mother's parents estate in the village of Dymka (today part of Chernivtsi Raion, Chernivtsi Oblast). In 1973, a museum was opened there in her memory.

=== Chernivtsi ===
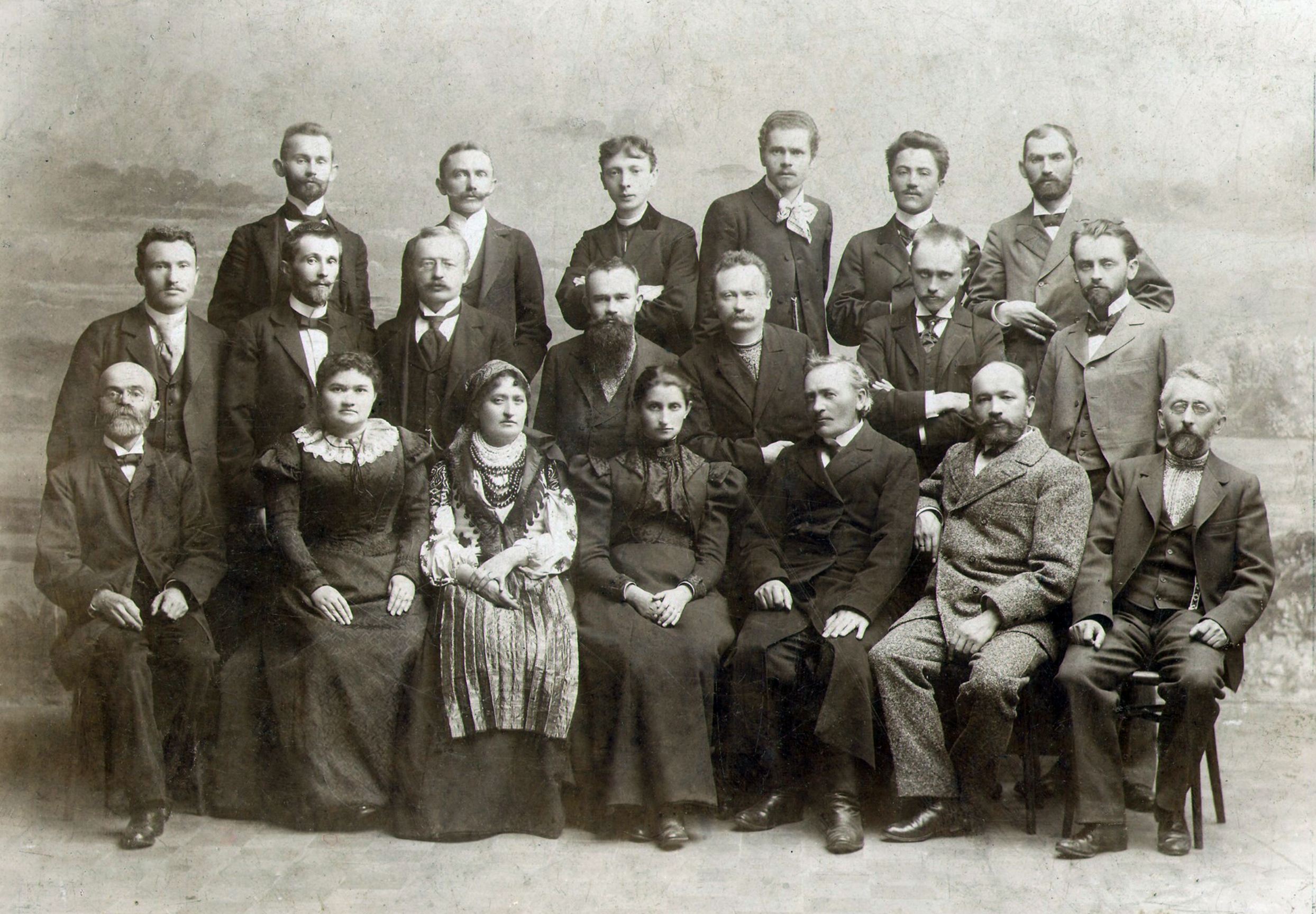
The board and members of the Shevchenko Scientific Society celebrating the 100th anniversary of the publication of Ivan Kotliarevsky's Eneida, Lviv, 31 October 1898: Sitting in the first row: Mykhaylo Pavlyk, Yevheniya Yaroshynska, Natalia Kobrynska, Olha Kobylianska, Sylvester Lepky, Andriy Chaykovsky, Kost Pankivsky. In the second row: Ivan Kopach, Volodymyr Hnatiuk, Osyp Makovei, Mykhailo Hrushevsky, Ivan Franko, Oleksander Kolessa, Bohdan Lepky. Standing in the third row: Ivan Petrushevych, Filaret Kolessa, Yossyp Kyshakevych, Ivan Trush, Denys Lukianovych, Mykola Ivasyuk.

In 1891, she moved to Chernivtsi. There she met Natalia Kobrynska (Ozarkevych) and Doctor Sofia Okunevska, who encouraged her to read widely and write in Ukrainian. She fell in love with Kobrynska's brother, Dr. Yevhen Ozarkevych.

In 1894, she became one of the initiators of the Association of Ruthenian Women in Bukovina, the program of which she included in her brochure Something about the idea of the feminist movement. One of her most prominent works which captured her political and social views was the novel Tsarivna (Princess), published in the Bukovina newspaper in 1895, as well as in other publications later. Princess (originally entitled Lorelei) was her first work published in the Ukrainian language, rather than in German.

In 1896, she wrote Arystokratka, followed by Impromptu phantasie, and Valse melancolique in 1898. The last of these constituted a pioneering treatment of same-sex love, and was based partly on Kobylians'ka's own experiences. In the 1890s, she had enjoyed a romantic relationship with the male literary critic, Osyp Makovei, who had championed Kobylians'ka's work and was comfortable with the theme of strong, independent, educated female characters who asserted their right for sexual fulfillment. However, the two later broke up and in 1901 Kobylians'ka met with the female writer Lesia Ukrainka (1871–1913). The meeting produced an intensely passionate union that was realised through correspondence as illness and circumstances prevented them from living together. The literary critic Ihor Kostetsky later suggested that their relationship was lesbian, while George S. N. Luckyj believes that: "There was probably little or no physical contact between the two women, though the language of their letters appears homo-erotic". Solomiia Pavlychko has noted the strong homoerotic motifs found in Kobylians'ka's published work, most notably Valse mélancolique.

Her other well known novels were Zemlya (Land, 1902) and V nedilyu rano zillia kopala (On Sunday Morning She Gathered Herbs, 1909). Of the latter, Vitaly Chernetsky wrote:

The book's plot is based on a well-known Ukrainian folk song, "Oi ne khody, Hrytsiu..." ("O Don't Go Out, Hryts'..."). In it, a young man, Hryts', courts two young women simultaneously. One of the two women, in despair, poisons her beloved with an herb potion. Since the plot of the work is known to the reader in advance, attention is turned instead to its presentation: the narrative techniques employed, the description of nature, rural customs and rituals, and the additional subplots and details introduced by the author. The novel's plot is developed through the introduction of a new set of characters, nomadic Gypsies who move between [a rural area in the Ukrainian Carpathians] and the Hungarian plain and play a pivotal role in the text. This element of what contemporary cultural studies would term hybridity makes Kobylians'ka's novel stand out among the works of Ukrainian Modernists tackling folkloric themes.

Simultaneously, some of her poetic and prose works in the abstract-symbolic style were published in various local magazines such as Svit and Ukrainian Hut.

Mykhailo Starytsky later wrote a play under the same name V nedilyu rano zillia kopala. That work was also translated into several languages. Later Kobylianska met and traveled with fellow Ukrainians such as Lesia Ukrainka, Ivan Franko, Vasyl Stefanyk, and Mykhailo Kotsiubynsky, who influenced her cultural and political outlook. Together with other writers such as Marko Cheremshyna, Osyp Makovey, Katria Hrynevycheva, she described World War I. Some of her stories of that period were Juda, The letter of a convicted soldier to his wife, and others.

Kobylianska openly endorsed the October Revolution. In 1918, she strongly opposed the union of Bukovina with Romania, which resulted in her persecution by the new Romanian authorities. In the interwar period, she lived in poverty, facing cultural marginalization, high prices and the absence of her own home, living with relatives. According to her own letters, it was cold in the houses, and she had no stable income. She collaborated with the interwar Ukrainian nationalist press and advocated for the secession of Bukovina from Romania and its unification with a Ukrainian state (either independent, or as a part of the Soviet Union). In 1927, while still living in Romania, she was admitted in the All-Russian Writers' Union, receiving a pension from the Soviet Union. Her works also began to be promoted in the Ukrainian SSR. Kobylianska stated: "We will find a way, if the Bolsheviks won't come". In 1940, when the Soviet Union occupied Bessarabia and Northern Bukovina, she welcomed the Soviet occupying troops. She received Soviet citizenship and was re-admitted to the Union of Soviet Writers in Ukraine; in 1941, when this territory returned to Romania, she was unable to leave Chernivtsi due to health problems.

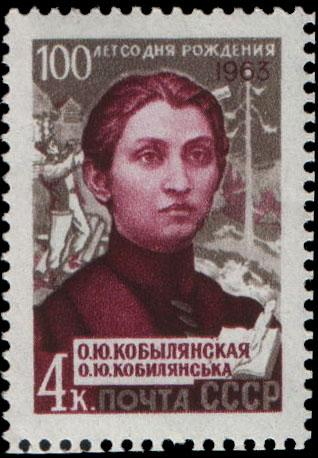
1963 Soviet postal stamp depicting Olha Kobylianska

Her apartment was searched, and several works and manuscripts were seized and vanished without trace. The Romanian government ordered the writer to be brought before a military court. Before her trial was completed, on 21 March 1942, Olha Kobylianska died at the age of 78. Romanian authorities banned Ukrainians from paying their last respects to the writer, with only relatives attending the funeral.

=== Heritage and legacy ===
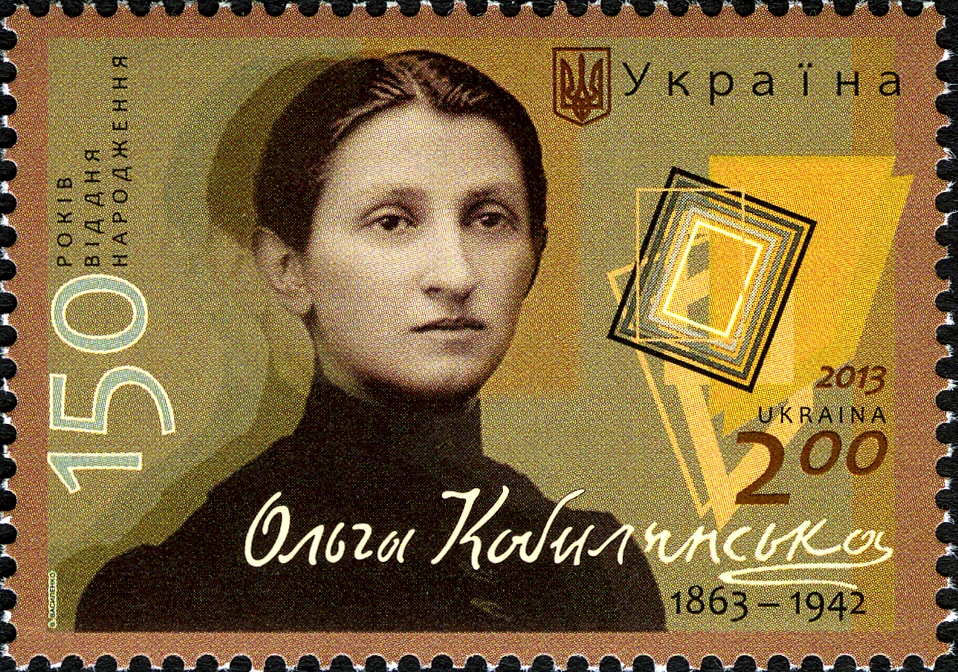
2013 Ukrainian postal stamp depicting Olha Kobylianska

On 27 November 1940, after the Soviet occupation of Northern Bukovina, the executive committee of Chernivtsi Oblast renamed the main pedestrian street of Chernivtsi, previously named after Iancu Flondor, after the writer. A number of streets was subsequently named after her, including in Kyiv, Lviv, Dnipro and Zaporizhzhia.

In 1954, Chernivtsi Drama Theatre was named after her. In 1964, a small monument was installed in front of the entrance to the theatre. After the renovation of the theatre in 1977–1980, a new monument by sculptors Anatolii Skyba and Mykola Myroshnychenko was installed. The original monument was moved to the village of Dymka in Chernivtsi Raion.

In 2006, Olha Kobylianska Literary Prize, awarded for the literary, artistic or journalistic work and scientific research on the topic of women in Ukrainian society, was founded.

== Creative activity ==
=== Stories and novels ===
- Man (1886)
- The Princess (1896)
- Earth (1901)
- Niobe (1905)
- Early on Sunday, She Gathered Herbs (1908)
- Through the Masonry (1911)
- By Situations (1913)
- Black Apostle (1926)

=== Short stories ===
- Pictures from the life of Bukovyna (1885)
- Spectacle (1885)
- The Dove and the Oak (1886)
- She got married (1886–1887)
- Impromptu phantasie (1894).
- Valse melancolique (1894).
- Rozhi (1896)
- He and She (1895)
- Time (1895)
- Battle (1895)
- What I Loved (1896)
- My Lilies (1901)
- Autumn (1902)
- Judas (1915)
- To Meet One's Fate (1915)
- Dreaming (1917)
- He Has Gone Mad (1923)
- Don't Laugh (1933) and others.

=== German-language works ===
Some of her works, written in the early period of creativity (before the transition to the Ukrainian language), were written in German.

== Style of writing ==
Her writings were influenced by Friedrich Nietzsche and George Sand. Kobylianska was interested in the Ukrainian peasantry, and often wrote about the lives of these people. She depicted the struggle between good and evil and the mystical force of nature, predestination, magic, and the irrational in many of her stories of peasant life. Her works are known for their impressionistic, lyrical descriptions of nature and subtle psychological portrayals.

Kobylianska's works have been published in many editions and selections. In 1944, a literary memorial museum dedicated to her was opened in Chernivtsi. This is in the building in which she lived from 1938 to 1942.

Solomiia Pavlychko has noted the strong homoerotic motifs found in Kobylians'ka's published work, most notably Valse mélancolique.

One of her quotes

While God gives me strength and while I am alive, I will work... It is our destiny to work, since the rest, that awaits for us afterwards, has no end. (Zemlya, 1902)

=== Cinema adaptations of works ===
- "Earth" (1954; in the roles - A. Buchma, L. Shvachko)
- "The Wolfhound" (1967)
- "The Melancholic Waltz" (1990, t / f; ) (1994, TV series, director C Turanyian)

=== In German ===
- Kleinrussische Novellen (Малоруські новели). Minden i. Westf. J. C. C. Bruns, [1901].
