= Anna Pavlyk =

Ukrainian activist and writer (1855–1928)

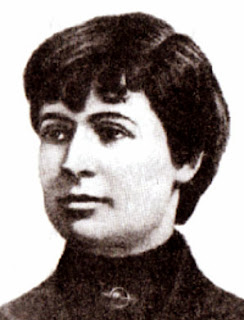
- Born: 26 January 1855
- Died: 13 October 1928 (aged 73)
- Occupation(s): activist, writer

Anna Pavlyk (26 January 1855 - 13 October 1928) was a Ukrainian social and cultural activist and writer, an active participant in the women's movement in Galicia.

== Biography ==
Anna Pavlyk was born in Monastyrske village, now part of the city of Kosiv, then in the Austrian Empire. Due to the difficult financial conditions of the family, Anna could not systematically attend school. She was a mercenary. Pavlyk had a great desire to learn, but could only do it on her own, by reading books. Pavlyk distributed the books and magazines sent to her by her brother Mykhailo Pavlyk among the villagers of Kosiv because of which she was persecuted by the local authorities.

In 1877, Pavlyk was arrested and convicted twice - in January and summer, together with Ivan Franko, Mykhailo Pavlyk, Ostap Terletsky, and others. Pavlyk was also arrested in 1879 and 1880. Each time the court issued a prison sentence.

== Works ==
Pavlyk wrote articles, essays and poems. Her article My and human sins, and lordly and popish truth is devoted to the injustice of the authorities. She wrote the essay Zaribnytsia (Almanac "The First Wreath", 1887). Pavlyk also wrote poems in which she strongly spoke out against the injustice of the authorities, the extortion of priests (Dishonesty, Pope's Conscience, Judgment of Fools), journalistic articles (A sample of a peasant farmer from Kosiv), recorded folklore.

Mykhailo Drahomanov's sister - Olga Drahomanova-Kosach (literary pseudonym Olena Pchilka), who met Anna Pavlyk through Ivan Franko, was interested in the work of the talented writer. In 1887, together with Nataliya Kobrynska, Pavlyk published an almanac of women's works - authors of Galicia and Naddnipro region The First Wreath, in which Pavlyk's short story was printed.

In the 1920s, Pavlyk, who remained single, helped orphans from village Monastyrske, and intended to build an orphanage and a house on specially purchased land where sick Ukrainian writers could come for rest and creative work. Still, she failed to realize this intention due to sudden death.

Anna Pavlyk died on 13 October 1928 in the city of Lviv, where she was buried. In Kosiv, one of the streets is named after her.
