= Nataliya Kobrynska =

Ukrainian writer, editor

- Наталія Кобринська
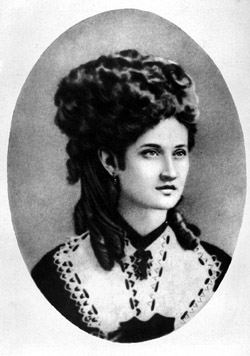
- Born: Nataliya Ozarkevych; 8 June 1855; Beleluia, Kingdom of Galicia and Lodomeria, Austrian Empire
- Died: 22 January 1920 (aged 64); Bolekhiv, Galicia
- Occupations: Writer, activist
- Spouse: Teofil Kobrynsky (d. 1882)
- Parents: Ivan Ozarkevych (father); Teofilia Okunevska (mother)

Nataliya Kobrynska (Ukrainian: Наталія Кобринська, 8 June 1855 – 22 January 1920) was a Ukrainian writer, socialist feminist, and activist from Austria-Hungary. She served as the first head of the Society of Ukrainian Women following its establishment in 1884. Kobrynska has been recognized as the leading figure in the development of Ukraine's feminist movement.

== Biography ==
The daughter of Reverend Ivan Ozarkevych, a Greek Catholic priest who was later elected to the Austrian Parliament, and Teofilia Okunevska, she was born Nataliya Ozarkevych in the village of Beleluia in the Galicia province of Austria-Hungary (now in Sniatyn urban hromada, Kolomyia Raion, Ivano-Frankivsk Oblast, Ukraine). At that time, women were not allowed to pursue education beyond the elementary level and so she was mainly educated at home. She studied several languages: German, French, Polish and Russian and read literature from various counties. At an early age, Kobrynska got acquainted with positivism and feminist literature, including writings by Ludwig Büchner, Ernest Renan, Karl Marx, Ferdinand Lassalle and John Stuart Mill.

In 1871, she married Teofil Kobrynsky, a theologian, folklorist and musician. He died in 1882 without leaving issue, and widowed Kobrynska was forced to return to Bolekhiv to live with her parents. For the rest of her life, she would continue wearing a mourning dress in memory of her husband.

Kobrynska went to Vienna with her father, where she met Ivan Franko; Franko encouraged her to take on the task of improving the status of Ukrainian women and to encourage them to seek equality with men. In 1884, in Stanislaviv she organized the Tovarystvo Ruskykh Zhinok (Association of Ruthenian Women) to educate women by exposing them to literature and by promoting discussions on women's rights.

In 1887, along with her cousin Sofia Okunevska, Kobrynska enlisted into the economics program at Zurich University in Switzerland, as women in Austria-Hungary were barred from receiving higher education at the time. In 1890, she was part of a delegation that lobbied the Minister of Education to allow women to attend university. She also advocated universal suffrage, day care and communal kitchens. In 1891 Kobrynska presided over a women's congress (viche) in Stryi, delivering an address in support of the establishment of kindergartens. Starting from 1901 she took part in management of a Ukrainian women's organization created in order to provide daycare for children.

During World War I, Kobrynska provided support to Ukrainian Sich Riflemen, but despite this Austrian authorities accused her of spying for Russia. During her later life, she became an adherent of spiritualism. Kobrynska died of typhus in 1920 in Bolekhiv.

== Literary work ==
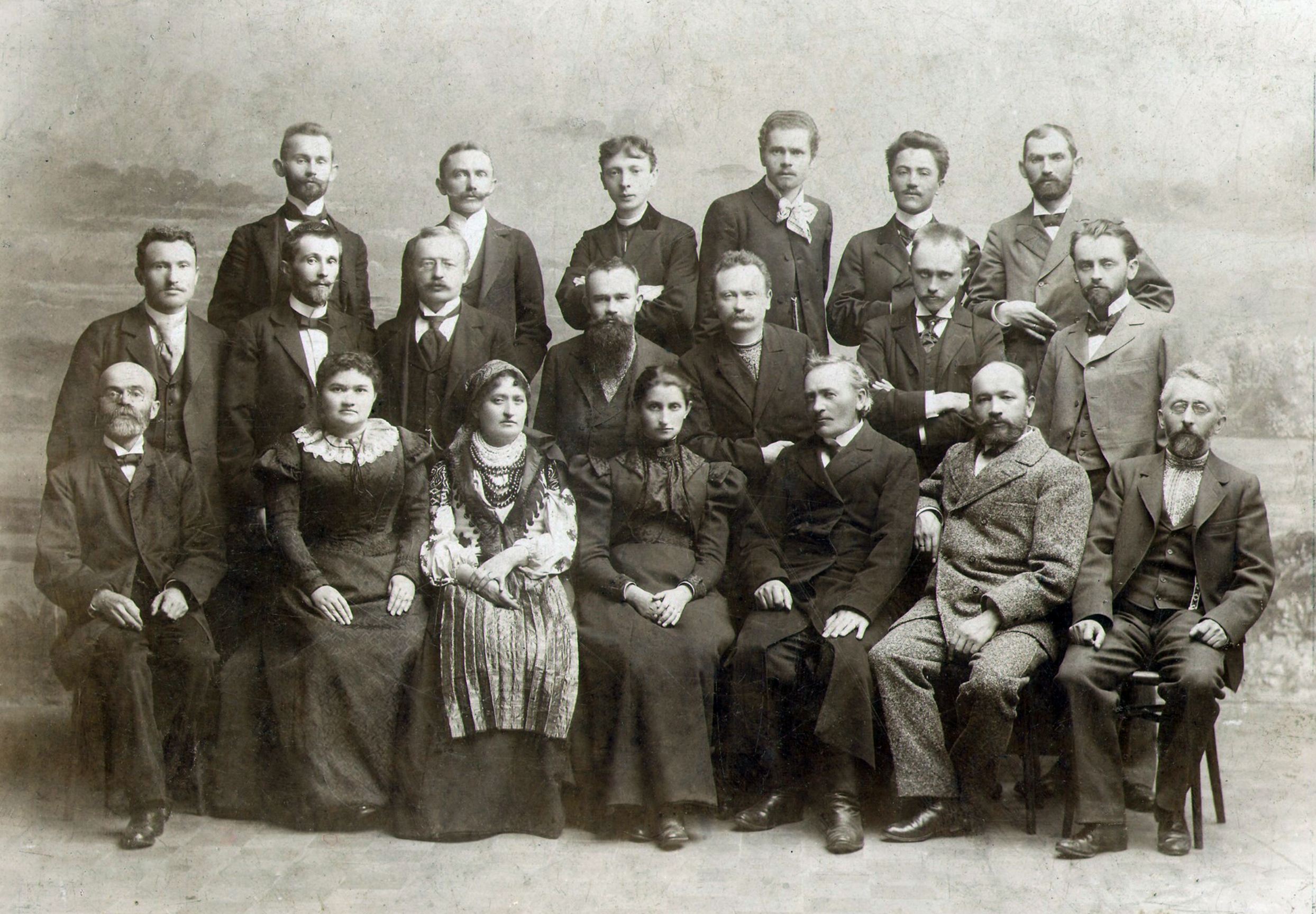
The board and members of the Shevchenko Scientific Society celebrating the 100th anniversary of the publication of Ivan Kotliarevsky's Eneida, Lviv, 31 October 1898: Sitting in the first row: Mykhaylo Pavlyk, Yevheniya Yaroshynska, Natalia Kobrynska, Olha Kobylianska, Sylvester Lepky, Andriy Chaykovsky, Kost Pankivsky. In the second row: Ivan Kopach, Volodymyr Hnatiuk, Osyp Makovej, Mykhailo Hrushevsky, Ivan Franko, Oleksander Kolessa, Bohdan Lepky. Standing in the third row: Ivan Petrushevych, Filaret Kolessa, Yossyp Kyshakevych, Ivan Trush, Denys Lukianovych, Mykola Ivasyuk.

A bust of Kobrynska in Bolekhiv

=== As author ===
Kobrynska wrote her first short story "Pani Shuminska" (later known as The Spirit of the Times, in 1883; the following year, she wrote a novella Zadlia kusnyka khliba (For a Piece of Bread). Her significant literary talent was demonstrated by her following stories dedicated to women's fate, Yadzia i Katrusia (1893) and Zhydivska dytyna (Jewish Child). Her later works were dedicated to folk beliefs and events of the First World War.

In 1904 Kobrynska published a collection of Gothic stories based on folk tradition under the title Kazky (Fairytales). Her fascination with mysticism went contrary to realist trends predominant in Ukrainian literature of the Carpathian region during that time. Kobrynska's turn to Modernism, including ideas of Nietzsche, was criticized by Franko and later Soviet literary critics, but in modern times her works in that genre have received critical acclaim.

Kobrynska was also active as a publicist, issuing several articles dedicated to the women's movement. In 1907 she published an article dedicated to Nietzsche's philosophy in the Dilo newspaper. In 1913 she published a Ukrainian translation of Maurice Maeterlinck's Ariadne and Bluebeard.

==== Translations ====
Kobrynska's work was translated to English for the collections The Spirit of the Times (1998) and Warm the Children, O Sun (1998). Broken was also translated by Hannah Leliv & Slava Faybysh for Virginia's Sisters: An Anthology of Women's Writings (2023).

=== As publisher ===
In 1887, with Olena Pchilka, she edited Pershyi vinok (The First Garland), a collection of writing by Ukrainian women. In 1893-1896, Natalia Kobrynska became involved in publishing. In order to establish more efficient book publishing, she moved to Lviv, seeking better conditions for popularizing feminist ideas. Kobrynska's publishing house, Zhinocha Sprava (Women’s Cause), published three issues of a women's almanac called Nasha dolya (Our Fate), which included works by Ukrainian writer Anna Pavlyk.

== Commemoration and legacy ==
Kobrynska's house in Bolekhiv, in which she lived during the last 13 years of her life, was demolished by Soviet authorities in 1946. Currently, there are plans to restore the building and turn it into a creative residence for female writers.
