= Omelian Hlibovytskyi =

Ukrainian Greek Catholic priest and public figure

- Омелян Глібовицький
- Born: 1856, according to other sources 1857; Krohulets, Austrian Empire
- Died: 27 September 1905; Hlybochok, Austria-Hungary
- Education: Lviv Theological Seminary

Omelian Mykhailovych Hlibovytskyi (Ukrainian: Омелян Михайлович Глібовицький; 1856, according to other sources 1857, Krohulets, Austrian Empire – 27 September 1905, Hlybochok, Austria-Hungary) was a Ukrainian Greek Catholic priest, novelist, publicist, public figure. Son of Mykhailo, brother of Dariia, Domna (wife of Sylvestr Lepkyi) and Lonhyn, father of Vasyl Hlibovytskyi, uncle (by mother) of Bohdan, Levko and Mykola Lepkyi.

== Biography ==
Omelian Hlibovytskyi was born in 1856 (or 1857) in Krohulets, now the Vasylkivtsi Hromada, Chortkiv Raion, Ternopil Oblast, Ukraine.

Hlibovytskyi graduated from the Lviv Theological Seminary (1881) and was ordained a priest at the same time. He served in parishes in the town of Melnytsia-Podilska (1886–1887) and the villages of Khudykivtsi (1887–1889), Bilche-Zolote ([1886], 1889–1893), Tsyhany (1893–1903), Hlybochok (1903–1905+) in the Chortkiv district. Author of articles and short stories.

In 1895, Mykhailo Dorundiak, Bohdan Lepkyi, Ivan Trush, Ivan Franko, Andrii Chaikovskyi, and Vasyl Shchurat visited Hlibovytskyi in Tsyhany. He corresponded with Ivan Franko.

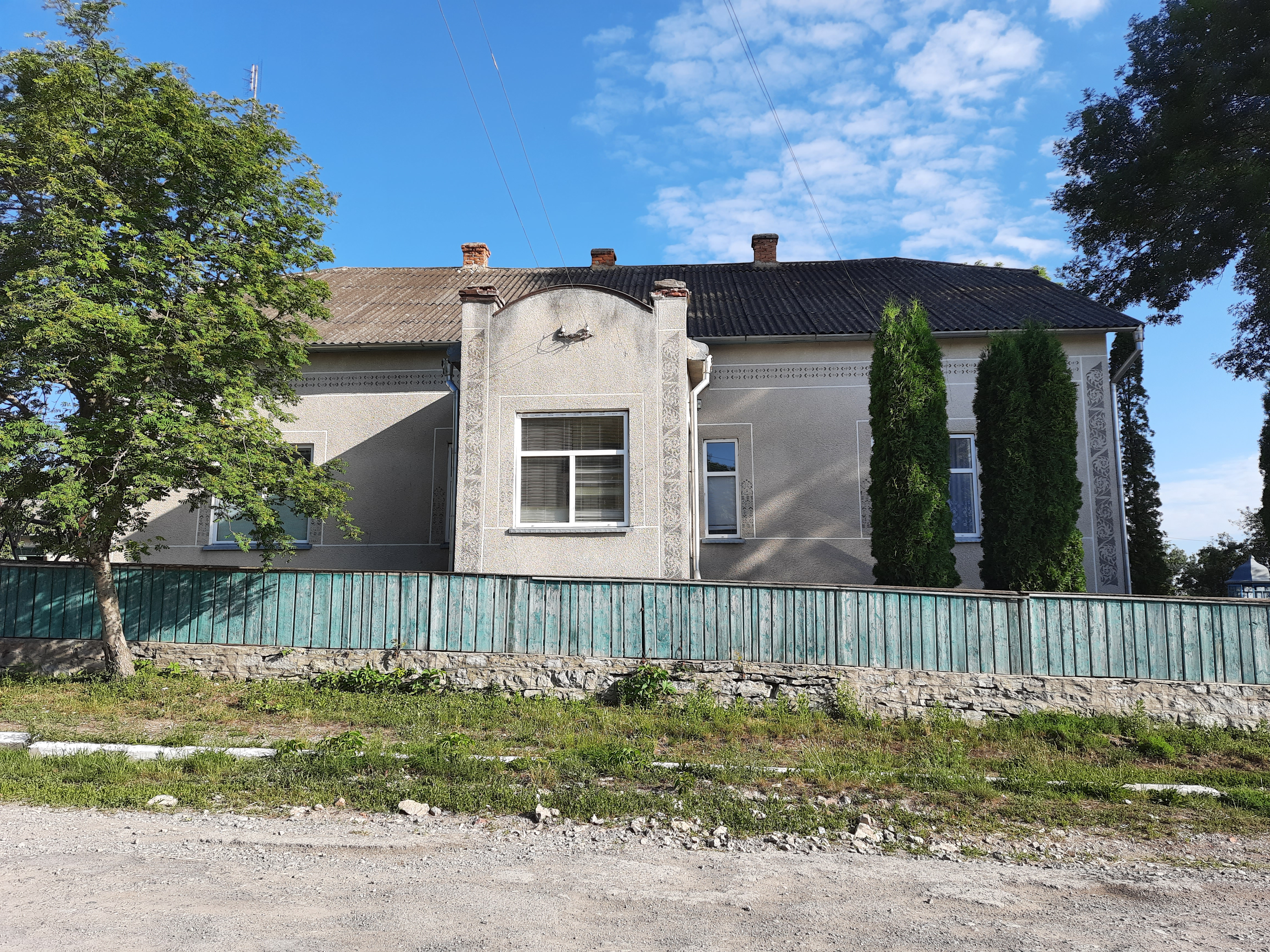
The house of Omelian Hlibovytskyi in Tsyhany

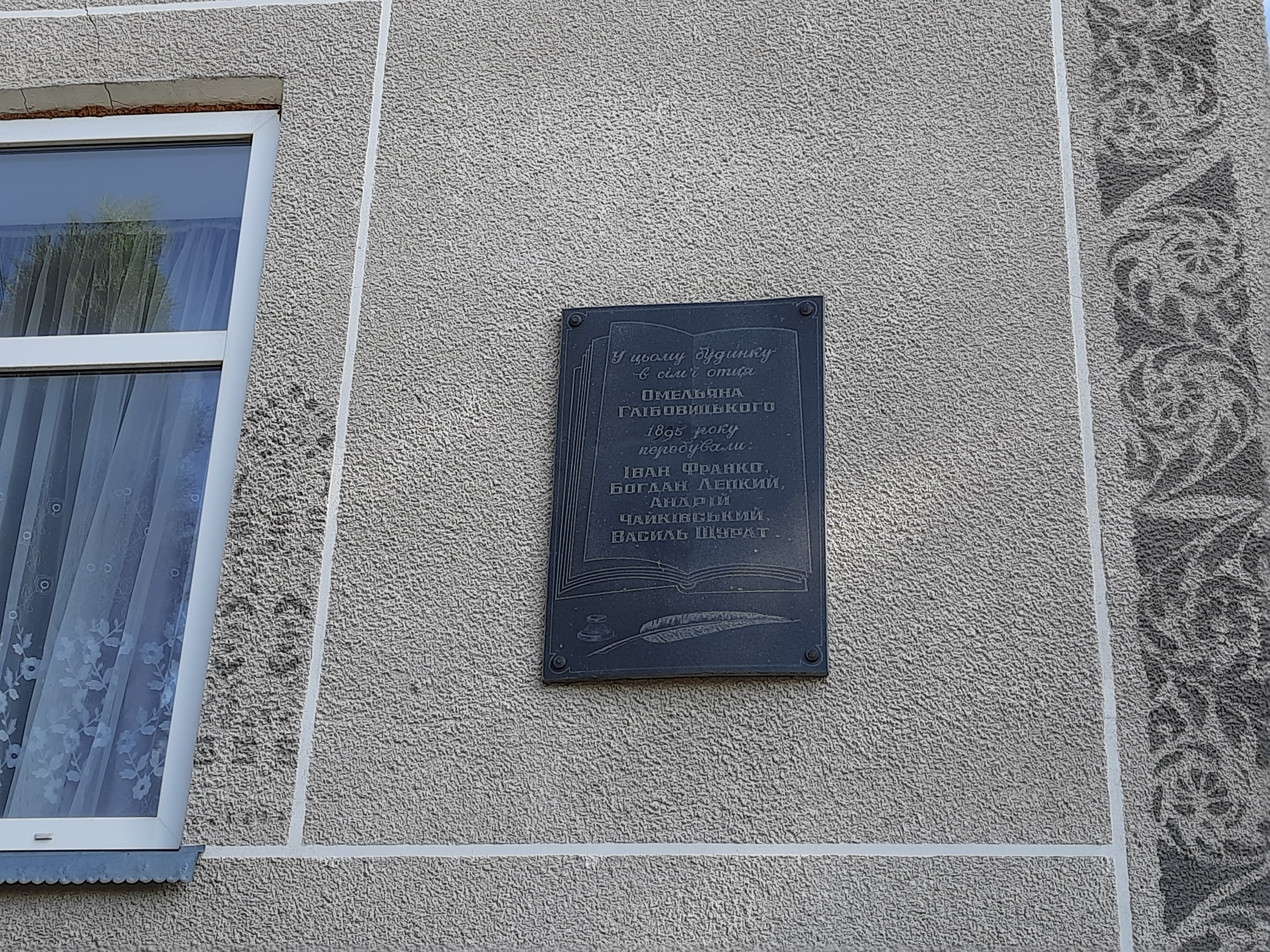
Memorial plaque on the house of Omelian Hlibovytskyi

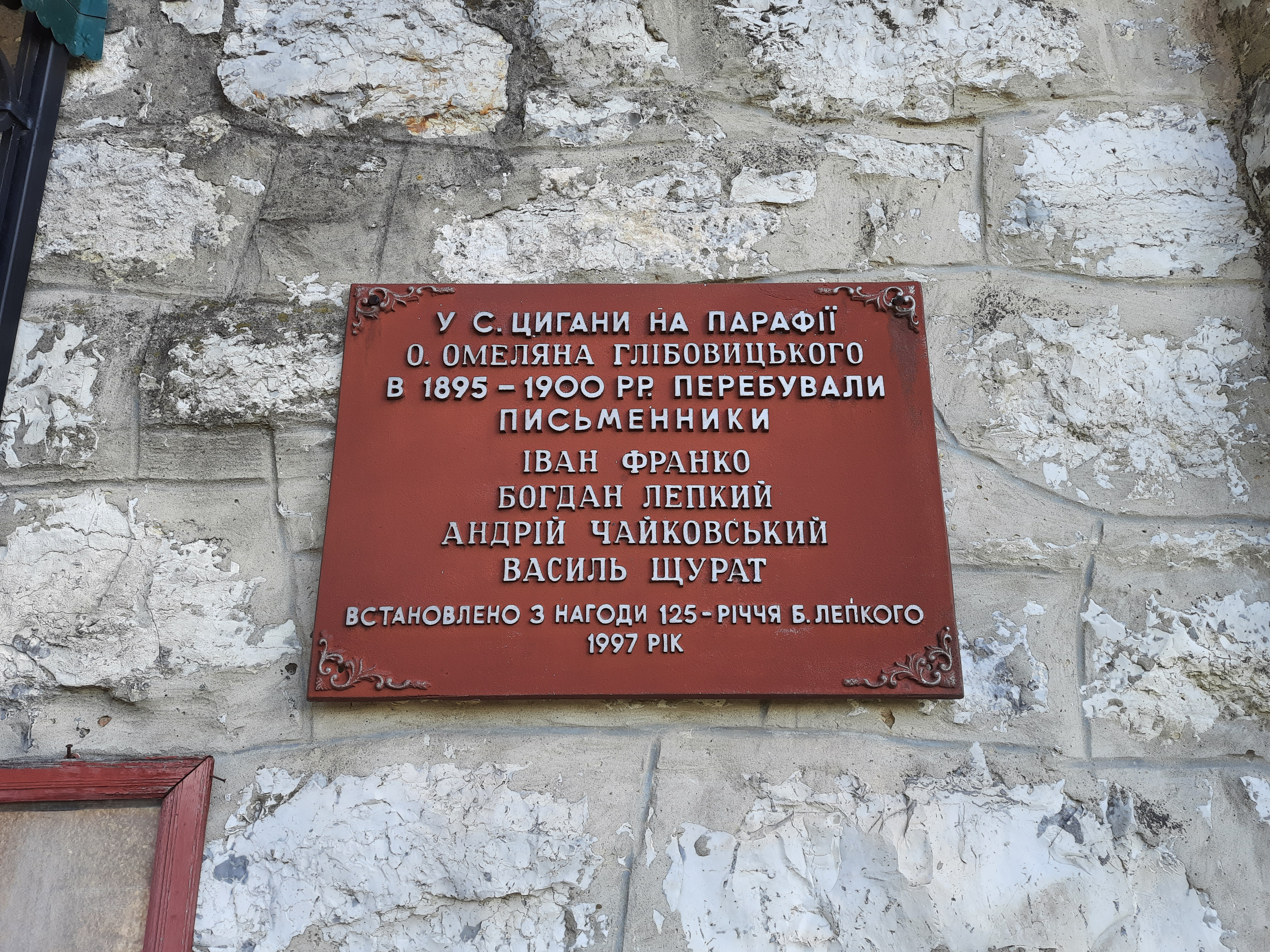
Memorial plaque on the wall of the Saints Peter and Paul church in Tsyhany
