= Ivan Popel =

Ukrainian priest (1850–1921)

- Іван Попель
- Born: 9 May 1850; Halych, Austrian Empire (now Ivano-Frankivsk Raion, Ivano-Frankivsk Oblast, Ukraine)
- Died: 18 February 1921 (aged 70); Dovhopole, Second Polish Republic (now Verkhovyna Raion, Ivano-Frankivsk Oblast, Ukraine)

Ivan Yosyfovych Popel (Ukrainian: Іван Йосифович Попель; 9 May 1850, Halych, Austrian Empire – 18 February 1921, Dovhopole, Second Polish Republic) was a Ukrainian Greek Catholic priest, social and cultural activist. He was the uncle of Mariyka Pidhiryanka.

== Biography ==
In 1870 he graduated from the Drohobych Gymnasium, in 1874 from Lviv University, and in 1874 from the Lviv Theological Seminary with ordination to the priesthood in Rome.

Served in parishes in Kalush (1874–1875), Nadorozhna, Tovmach Powiat (1874–1883, employee), Hlyboka (1883–1884), Roztoky (1884–1888, administrator), Zalishchyky, Dovhopole (1888–1921).

Founded cultural, educational, and economic societies in the Hutsul region. He had a library that was the largest and most informative in the Kosiv region. He ran for the Austrian Parliament.

In 1904, he opposed the Austrian regime and was imprisoned for a year.

Fr. Popel's house was visited by Mariyka Pidhiryanka, Olha Kobylianska, Osyp Makovei, Ivan Franko (who corresponded with him), Marko Cheremshyna, Vasyl Stefanyk, Lesya Ukrainka, and Klyment Kvitka. Assisted Ivan Franko, Fedir Vovk, Volodymyr Hnatiuk, Volodymyr Shukhevych, E. Zhelikhovskyi, Bohdan Lepky, Osyp Makovei, Ivan Trush in ethnographic, ethnological, archeological, and anthropological research of the Hutsul region.

Died on 18 February 1921 in Dovhopole, Verkhovyna Raion. He was buried in the cemetery near the church, the grave has not been preserved.

== Honoring the memory ==
Bohdan Lepky dedicated the poem "Khrest na kruchi" to Fr. Popel.

A local school teacher, Mariyka Pidhiryanka, initiated the installation of a granite tombstone on Fr. Popel's grave; she collected exhibits and valuable materials about the parish priest, Fr. Ivan Popel, and his niece, Mariia Pidhirianka, for the school's local history room-museum.
