= Saint Paraskeva Church, Krohulets =

Church in Ternopil Oblast, Ukraine

Saint Paraskeva church
- Церква Святої Великомучениці Параскеви П'ятниці
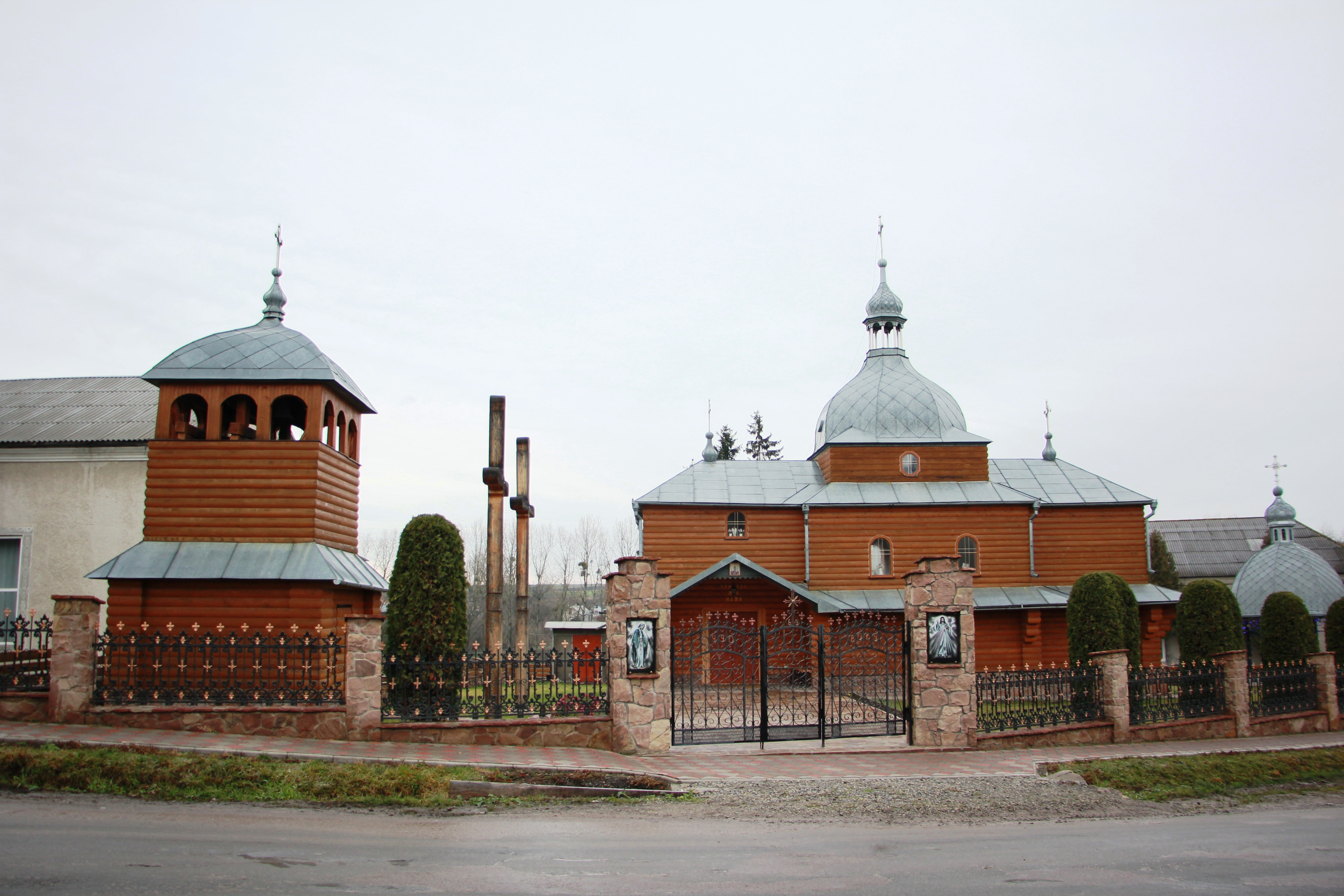

- Location within Ternopil Oblast

Religion
- Affiliation: Orthodox Church of Ukraine

Location
- Location: Krohulets, Vasylkivtsi rural hromada, Chortkiv Raion, Ternopil Oblast, Ukraine
- Coordinates: 49°06′00″N 26°00′22″E

Architecture
- Completed: 1760s–1780s

Immovable Monument of National Significance of Ukraine
- Official name: Церква Параскеви та дзвіниця (дер.) (Church of St Paraskeva and bell tower (wooden))
- Type: Architecture
- Reference no.: 190098

Saint Paraskeva Church (Ukrainian: Церква Святої Великомучениці Параскеви П'ятниці) is an Orthodox parish church (OCU) in Krohulets of the Vasylkivtsi rural hromada of the Chortkiv Raion of the Ternopil Oblast. The church and the bell tower are designated as an architectural monument of national significnace (protection number 190098).

== History ==
The parish church of Saint Paraskeva Pyatnytsia, a wooden structure, has an uncertain construction date. While a 1866 service book contains a note from an old psalter suggesting the church was built in 1576, this has not been confirmed by other sources. Researcher Bohdan Hryniuka believes the church was actually built sometime between the 1760s and 1780s. An 1805 inventory describes the building as being in good condition, with a stone foundation, oak frame, and shingled roof, along with a separate wooden bell tower.

According to the historical memoir collection Chortkivska Okruha, villagers began constructing a new church across from the old one just before World War II.

During the Soviet era, the original church was closed, and in the 1980s, its premises were converted into a museum of atheism. Services were finally resumed in the church in the early 1990s.

== Priests ==
- Petro Dunikovskyi (1792),
- Yakiv Huchynskyi ([1832]–1849+),
- Mykhailo Hlibovytskyi (1849–1873),
- Sylvester Lepkyi (1873–1875, administrator; 1875–1881; father of Bohdan, Mykola, and Levko Lepkyi),
- Y. Bovarovskyi,
- A. Sthymeskyi,
- Isydor Kysilevskyi (1881–1882, administrator; 1882–1925+),
- Ivan Fytsalovych (1918–1919+, priest's assistant),
- Nestor Kysilevskyi (1925–1928, administrator; 1928–1938]),
- Roman Yavorskyi (from 1989).

== Bibliography ==
- Гринюка Б. Окремі пам'ятки села Крогулець // Охорона культурної спадщини як невід'ємний елемент сталого розвитку суспільства (Конференція приурочена 30-річниці створення НЗ «Замки Тернопілля» та Міжнародному дню музеїв): Матеріали наукової конференції (м. Збараж, 16–17 травня 2024 р.). — Збараж, 2024. — С. 61–66.
- Гринюка Б. Окремі нотатки з історії храму святої Великомучениці Параскеви та греко-католицької громади села Крогулець (XVIII — кінець XX ст.), Українська Греко-Католицька Церква у сучасних процесах розвитку українського суспільства (до 420-ліття укладення Берестейської унії. 70-ліття Львівського "псевдособору" 1946 р.): Матеріали Всеукраїнської науково-практичної конференції (м. Тернопіль, 21–22 квітня 2016 р.), Тернопіль, 2016, s. 59–65.
