= Dilo (newspaper) =

Ukrainian daily newspaper (1880–1939)

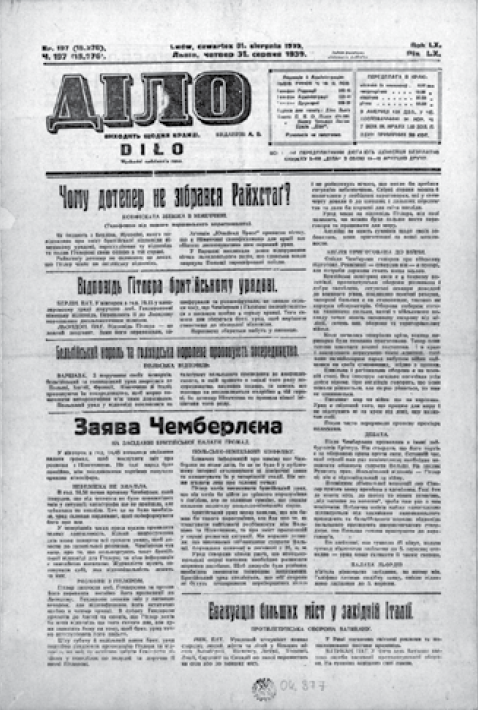
- The first page of the Dilo newspaper of 31 August 1939 (one of the last issues)
- Type: Daily newspaper
- Editor: Ivan L. Rudnytskyi
- Founded: 1880
- Ceased publication: 15 September 1939
- Language: Ukrainian
- Headquarters: Lviv

Dilo (Ukrainian: Діло, Latynka: Diło) was the first Ukrainian daily newspaper founded on 1 January 1880 in Lviv, Austria-Hungary. The newspaper was banned whenever Russians were occupying Lviv, first during the World War I, second during the World War II.

Alternative names in Cyrillic had the following variations: Дѣло and Дїло, both transliterated as Dilo.

== Information ==
In 1880–1887 it was published twice and three times a week, and from 1888 onwards it was published daily. Due to persecution, the newspaper was forced to change its name: 1920 as Hromadska Dumka, Ukrainska Dumka, 1921 as Ukrainskyi Visnyk, 1922 as Hromadskyi Visnyk, Svoboda, and from 1922 onwards as Dilo. In September 1939, it ceased to exist due to the Bolshevik invasion of Lviv.

In 1881–1906, Dilo published the "Biblioteka naiznamenytishykh povistei" (74 volumes in total); in 1936–1939, the "Biblioteka “Dila”" (48 volumes).

Over the years, the newspaper was edited by Antin Horbachevsky, Ivan Belei, Oleksandr Borkovskyi, Volodymyr Okhrymovych, Yevhen Levytskyi, Yaroslav Vesolovskyi, Lonhyn Tsehelskyi, Vasyl Mudryi, Ivan Nimchuk, Volodymyr Bachynskyi, Dmytro Levytskyi, Vasyl Paneiko, Fed Fedortsiv, and Ivan L. Rudnytskyi.

The newspaper also collaborated with Ivan Franko, Mykhailo Hrushevskyi, Oleksandr Konyskyi, Mykola Kostomarov, Volodymyr Antonovych, Ivan Krypiakevych, Viacheslav Lypynskyi, Osyp Makovei, Kornylo Ustyianovych, Vasyl Shchurat, Oleksandr Barvinskyi, Dmytro Doroshenko, Volodymyr Doroshenko, Olgerd Bochkovsky, Yulian Romanchuk, Bohdan Lepkyi, Mykhailo Rudnytskyi, Hnat Khotkevych, and others.
