= Dovhopole =

Rural locality in Ivano-Frankivsk Oblast, Ukraine

Dovhopole Довгополе
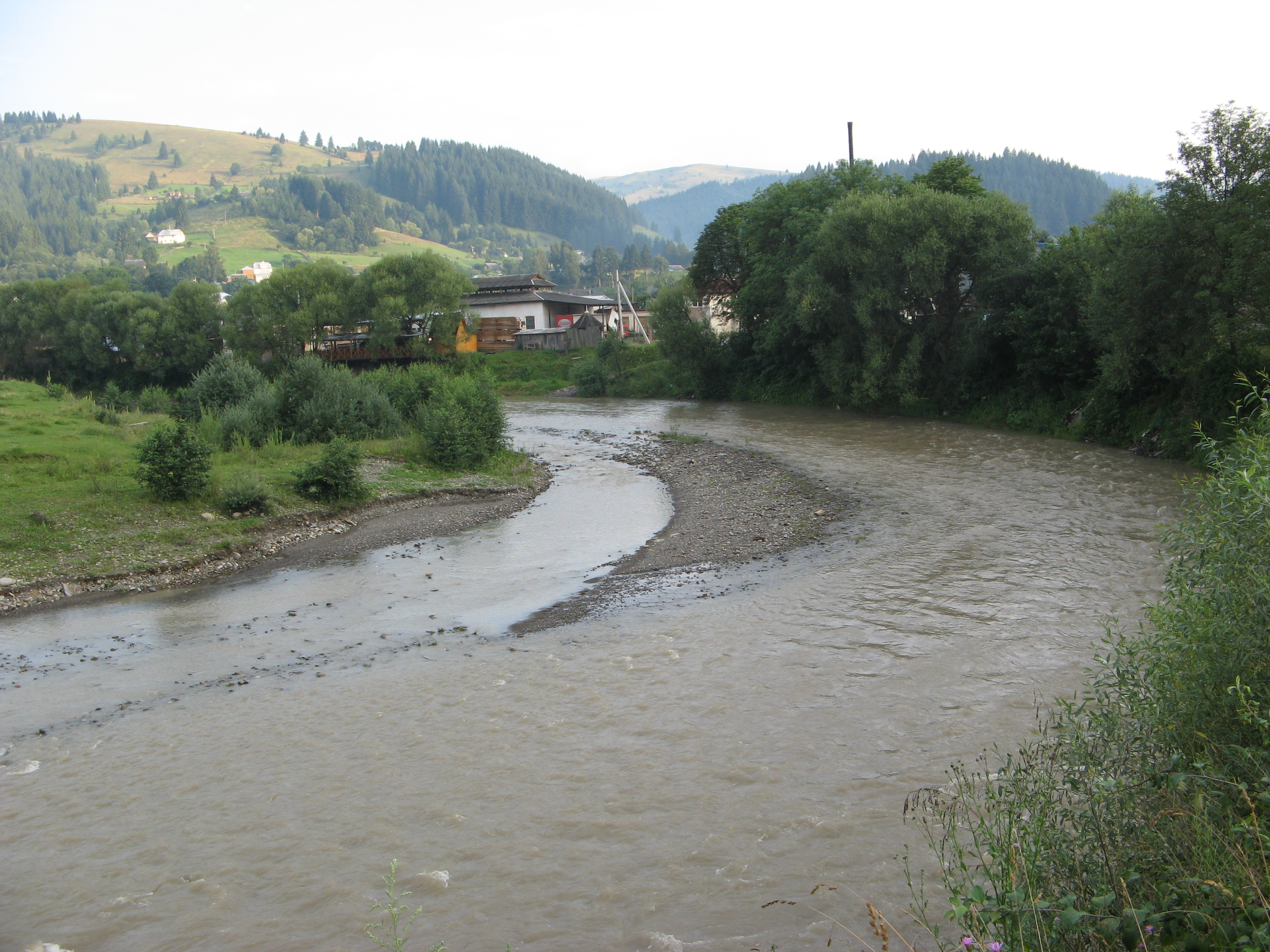
- Bilyi Cheremosh river in Dovhopole

- Location in Ivano-Frankivsk Oblast
- Coordinates: 48°4′26″N 24°58′9″E
- Country: Ukraine
- Oblast: Ivano-Frankivsk Oblast
- Raion: Verkhovyna Raion
- Hromada: Biloberizka rural hromada
- Time zone: UTC+2 (EET)
  - Summer (DST): UTC+3 (EEST)
- Postal code: 78725

Dovhopole (Ukrainian: Довгополе) is a village in the Biloberizka rural hromada of the Verkhovyna Raion of Ivano-Frankivsk Oblast in Ukraine.

== History ==
The Ivano-Frankivsk Regional Council, by a decision of 15 July 1993, changed the name of the village of Dovhopillia to Dovhopole.

On 19 July 2020, as a result of the administrative-territorial reform and liquidation of the Verkhovyna Raion, the village became part of the newly formed Verkhovyna Raion.

== Notable residents ==
The house of the local priest Ivan Popel was visited by well-known Ukrainian authors Mariyka Pidhiryanka, Ivan Franko, Vasyl Stefanyk, Marko Cheremshyna, Volodymyr Hnatiuk, Lesya Ukrainka, Klyment Kvitka, Olha Kobylianska, and Osyp Makovei. Painter Ivan Trush also visited the village.
