= Mykhailo Hlibovytskyi =

Ukrainian Greek Catholic priest and public figure

- Михайло Глібовицький
- Born: 1818
- Died: 28 February 1887 (aged 68–69); Berezhany, Austria-Hungary
- Education: Greek Catholic Theological Seminary in Lviv, Lviv University

Mykhailo Hlibovskyi (Ukrainian: Михайло Глібовицький, 1818 – 28 February 1887, Berezhany, Austria-Hungary) was a Ukrainian Greek Catholic priest and public figure. Father of Dariia, Domna (wife of Sylvester Lepkyi) and Omelian Hlibovytskyi, maternal grandfather of Bohdan, Lev and Mykola Lepkyi.

== Biography ==
Studied at the Berezhany gymnasium with Markiyan Shashkevych; graduated from the Greek Catholic Theological Seminary in Lviv and the Theological Faculty of Lviv University. Ordained a priest in 1842. He was the administrator of parishes in the villages of Teliache (1842–1848), and at the same time the superior of the villages of Vivsia (1845–1848) and Sernyky Horishni (1848-1849). From 1849 to 1873 he was a chaplain in the village of Krohulets (now Chortkiv Raion), from 1873 he was the parish priest of Berezhany, and in 1873–1881 he was the dean of the Berezhany deanery. Also, he was a vice-marshal of the Berezhany district.

The large home library of at. Mykhailo contained the magazine Rusalka Dnistrovaia and manuscripts by at. Markiyan Shashkevych. Metropolitan Joseph and Cardinal Sylwester Sembratovych visited his house.
