= Saints Peter and Paul Church, Tsyhany =

Greek Catholic church in Tsyhany, Ukraine

Saints Peter and Paul Church
- Церква святих верховних апостолів Петра і Павла

- Location within Ternopil Oblast

Religion
- Affiliation: Ukrainian Greek Catholic Church

Location
- Location: Tsyhany
- Coordinates: 48°52′07.1″N 26°06′01.1″E

Saints Peter and Paul Church (Ukrainian: Церква святих верховних апостолів Петра і Павла) is a Greek catholic parish church (UGCC) in Tsyhany of the Borshchiv urban hromada of the Chortkiv Raion of the Ternopil Oblast. It is an architectural monument of local importance.

== History ==
The first mention of the parish of Tsyhany dates back to 1784, as it is known from the church metrics dated 1784, which were kept by Andrii Domynskyi.

It is likely that the parish and church were subsidiary to the Burdiakivtsi parish.

On 21 September 1852, the parish of Zhylyntsi was attached to the parish of Tsyhany.

During the time of the priest Omelian Hlibovytskyi, visited and stayed in the village parish Ivan Franko, Bohdan Lepky, and Andrii Chaikovskyi. In 1895, the Ukrainian prominent poet Ivan Franko read liturgical book Apostol in a wooden church and sang with a choir.

From 1902 to 1903, a new stone church was built, which still exists today. The previous wooden one is now located in the village of Dubivka and is still functioning. It is known that this church was brought to Tsyhany from Skala-Podilska. In 1905, the new church of the Holy Apostles Peter and Paul was consecrated by Bishop Hryhorii Khomyshyn of Stanyslaviv. The donors of the construction were parishioners. The author of the iconostasis is Anton Strelbytskyi from Bilche-Zolote. The images of Jesus Christ and the Mother of God on the iconostasis were painted by Yulian Pankevych. The church was first painted in 1918 (by artist Didushenko from Kyiv) and again in 1991 (by artist Shevchenko from Odesa). The architect is Adam Lantsutskyi.

On 29 September 1929, the Holy Mission was conducted by Volodymyr Parodko, and in 2005 by Mykhailo Shevchyshyn, OSBM.

Until 1946, the parish belonged to the Skala Deanery of the Stanyslaviv Eparchy of the UGCC. From 1946 to 1991, the parish and the church were subordinated to the Russian Orthodox Church, and since 1991 they have been in the bosom of the UGCC again.

The parish was visited by Bishop Hryhorii Khomyshyn of the Stanyslaviv Eparchy and Bishop Irynei Bilyk of the Buchach Eparchy.

The parish has the Pope's Worldwide Prayer Network and the Altar Guard.

== Priests ==
- о. Andrii Dominskyi,
- о. Mykola Malynovskyi (1807–?),
- о. Matei Kinasevych,
- о. Ihnatii Napadievych (21 September 1852 – 1855),
- о. Teodor Hrytsyna (1855–1866),
- о. Ivan Mochulskyi (1866–1891),
- о. Volodymyr Karkhut (1891–1893),
- о. Omelian Hlibovytskyi (1893–1903),
- о. Dmytro Kardydyk (1903–1933),
- о. Stepan Lavkevych (1933–1935),
- о. Mykhailo Tsaruk (1935–1940),
- о. Yosyp Antkiv,
- о. Volodymyr Zavysliak,
- о. Vasyl Bihun,
- о. Mykhailo Hrytskiv (since 20 June 2010).
