= Kryvenke =

Kryvenke Кривеньке
- Location in Ternopil Oblast
- Coordinates: 49°00′15″N 26°06′35″E
- Country: Ukraine
- Oblast: Ternopil Oblast
- Raion: Chortkiv Raion
- Hromada: Husiatyn Hromada

Population (2018)
  - Total: 414
- Time zone: UTC+2 (EET)
  - Summer (DST): UTC+3 (EEST)
- Postal code: 48561

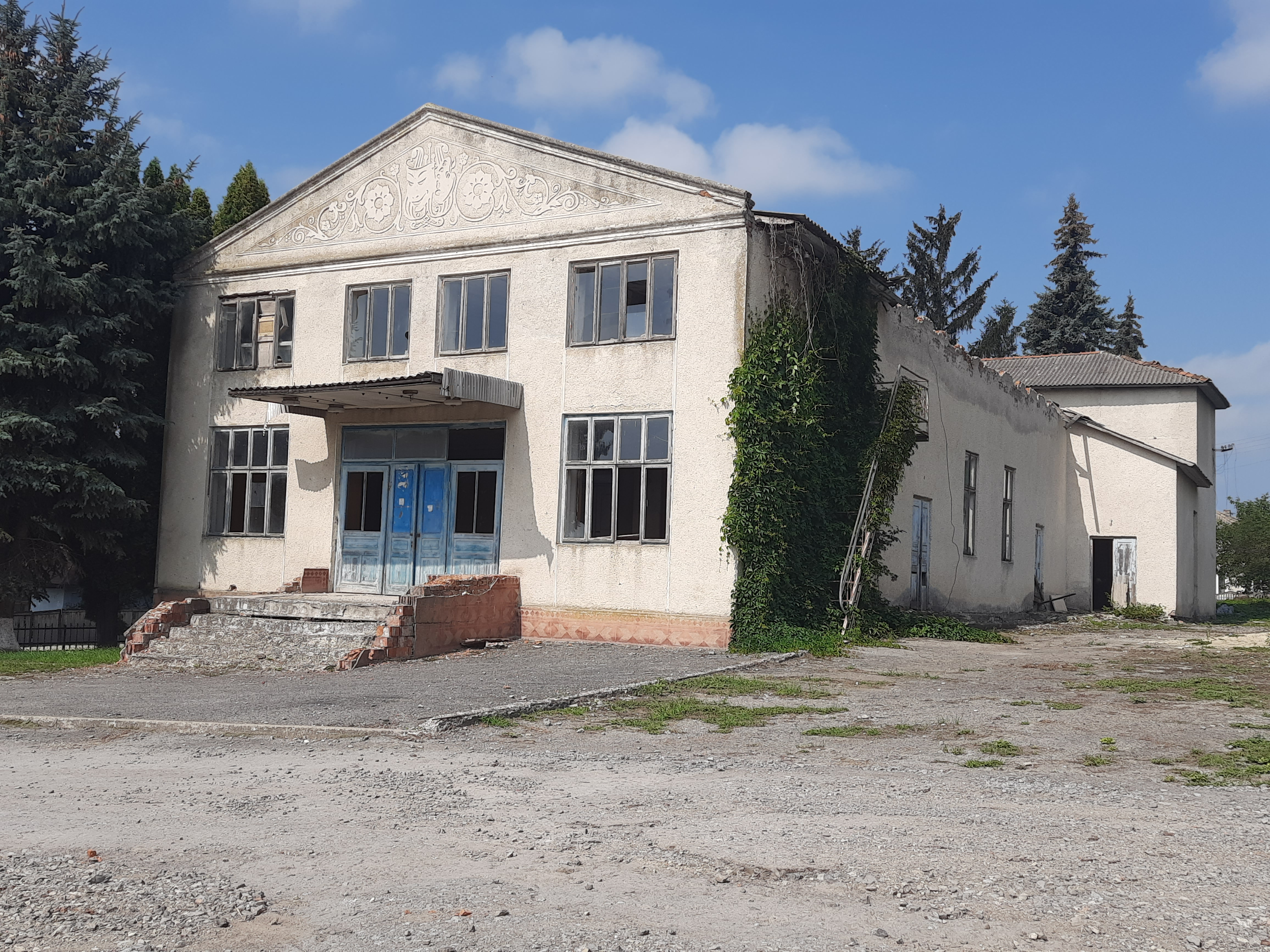

Kryvenke (Ukrainian: Кривеньке, Polish: Krzyweńkie) is a village in Ukraine, Ternopil Oblast, Chortkiv Raion, Husiatyn settlement hromada.

== History ==
The first written mention of the settlement is a record of the Polish king for the village of Kryve, Skalsk district for Andrzej of Babshyn, dated 17 July 1413.

From 1 December 2020, Kryvenke has belonged to the Husiatyn settlement hromada.

== Religion ==
- Church of John the Baptist (UGCC; 1757; brick; rebuilt in 1987)

== Notable residents ==
- Bohdan Lepky (1872–1941), Ukrainian writer, poet, scholar, public figure, and artist
- Sylvester Lepkyi (1845–1901), Ukrainian writer, religious and public figure

== Sources ==
- (in Ukrainian) Мельничук Б., Уніят В., Федечко М., Кривеньке // Ternopil Oblast. History of cities and villages: in 3 v. / Ternopil: "Terno-graph", 2014, V. 3: М—Ш, S. 484—486. — ISBN 978-966-457-246-7.
- (in Ukrainian) Уніят В., Кривеньке // Ternopil Encyclopedic Dictionary: in 4 v. / editorial board: H. Yavorskyi and other, Ternopil: "Zbruch", 2005, V. 2: К—О, S. 234. — ISBN 966-528-199-2.
