= Hlybochok =

Hlybochok (Ukrainian: Глибочок) may refer to several places in Ukraine:

- Hlybochok, Khmelnytskyi Oblast, a village
- Hlybochok, Ternopil Oblast, a village
- Glubochek, an archaeological settlement of the Cucuteni–Trypillia culture
