= Ihor Skochylias =

Ukrainian historian, and local historian (1967–2020)

- Ігор Скочиляс
- Born: Ihor Yaroslavovych Skochylias; 5 April 1967; Tsyhany, Ukrainian RSR (now Ukraine)
- Died: 20 December 2020 (aged 53); Lviv, Ukraine
- Education: University of Lviv
- Occupations: Historian, and local historian
- Years active: 1991–1993

Ihor Skochylias (Ukrainian: Ігор Ярославович Скочиляс; 5 April 1967 – 20 December 2020) was a Ukrainian historian, and local historian. Doctor of History and Professor.

== Biography ==
Ihor Skochylias was born on 5 April 1967, in Tsyhany, now the Borshchiv urban hromada of the Chortkiv Raion of the Ternopil Oblast of Ukraine.

In 1991, he graduated with honors from the Faculty of History at University of Lviv. A student of the Lviv archaeological school of Yaroslav Dashkevych.

In 1991–1993, he worked as an archivist of the II category and a research officer at the State Archives of Ternopil Oblast. In 1993-2012, he was working at the Lviv Branch of the Institute of Ukrainian Archeography, where he held the following positions: leading archaeologist in 1993, research fellow in 1998, senior research fellow in 2002, and leading research fellow in 2011–2012.

In 1996–2007, he was a research fellow at the Institute of Church History; in 2010–2016, he was Dean of the Faculty of Humanities; in 2013–2015, he was acting head, and in 2015 he became a Professor of the Department of Modern and Contemporary History of the Faculty of Humanities of Ukraine; in 2016–2020, he was Vice-Rector for Research; in 2020, he was Head of the Department of History of the Faculty of Humanities and Head of the Center for Religious Culture of the Ukrainian Catholic University.

In 2000, he became a Candidate of History, and in 2011 he was awarded the degree of Doctor of History. In 2013–2015, he was a visiting Professor at the Ukrainian Free University in Munich, and in 2020 – at the Department of Ukrainian Studies at the Jagiellonian University in Kraków.

He died on 20 December 2020 in Lviv, where he was buried at Lychakiv Cemetery.

=== Membership in academic and public organizations ===
In 1992, Skochylias became a member and co-founder of the local history association "Dzherelo", and co-editor of the scientific and local history collection "Litopys Borshchivshchyny" in Borshchiv. In 1992–1995, he was a member of the editorial board of the scientific collection "Ukraina v mynulomu".

In 1993, Skochylias became a member of the Ukrainian Heraldry Society, and in 1998, the Ukrainian Theological Scientific Society. In 2002–2010, he was the chairman of the Historical Commission, and from 2008 to 2011 was a member of the Presidium of the Shevchenko Scientific Society in Ukraine.

In 2005–2006, he was a member of the Committee for the Protection of Archives (Kyiv, Lviv); from 2007, he was a member of the International Commission on the History of Christianity, and in 2014, the Commission on Polish-Ukrainian Cultural Relations of the Polish Academy of Sciences.

== Works ==
The author of more than 300 scientific publications, in which Skochylias presented research on pre-modern religious culture in Ukraine, the ecclesial tradition of Eastern Christianity, the union idea, and the institutional history of the Kyiv Metropolis.

Main works:

- "Ukrainska tserkva na Borshchivshchyni ta inshi storinky natsionalnoho vidrodzhennia kraiu" (1992)
- "Povitovyi komitet UNDO u suspilno-politychnomu zhytti Borshchivshchyny seredyny 20-kh – kintsia 30-kh rr. XX st." (1995)
- "Sobory Lvivskoi yeparkhii XVI–XVIII stolit" (2006, compiler)
- "Relihiia ta kultura Zakhidnoi Volyni na pochatku XVIII st.: Za materiialamy Volodymyrskoho soboru 1715 roku" (2008)
- "Halytska (Lvivska) yeparkhiia XII–XVIII stolit: orhanizatsiina struktura ta pravovyi status" (2010)
- "Heneralni vizytatsii tserkov i monastyriv Volodymyrskoi uniinoi yeparkhii kintsia XVII – pochatku XVIII stolit: knyha protokoliv ta okremi opysy" (2012, co-author)
- "Przed wielkim podziałem: Prawosławna metropolia kijowska do 1458 roku" (2013, co-authored by Andrzej Gil)
- "Volodymyrsko-Beresteiska yeparkhiia XI–XVIII stolit: istorychni narysy" (2013, co-authored by Andrzej Gil)
- "Dar liubovy": Podatok kunyche (katedratyk) u Kyivskii mytropolii XIII–XVIII stolit (2013)
- "Przed wielkim podziałem: Metropolia kijowska Cerkwi Prawosławnej do 1458 roku" (2013, co-authored by Andrzej Gil)
- "Kościoły Wschodnie w państwie polsko-litew skim w procesie przemian i adaptacji: Metropolia kijowska w latach 1458–1795" (2014, co-authored by Andrzej Gil)
- "Na perekhresti kultur: Monastyr i khram Presviatoi Triitsi u Vilniusi" (2017, 2019 co-author)
- "Kultūrų kryžkelė: Vilniaus Švč. Trejybės šventovė ir vienuolynas" (2017, 2019, co-author)
- "Zamoiskyi provintsiinyi sobor Rus'koi Uniinoi Tserkvy 1720 roku" (2021, book 1, co-editor, posthumously)
- "Sobory Kyivskoi arkhyieparkhii XV–XVIII stolit: dokumenty i materialy" (2021, posthumously)

== Awards ==
- 2011: Award of the National Academy of Sciences of Ukraine and the Ministry of Education, Youth and Sports of Ukraine "For significant contribution to the development of science, active scientific and organizational work"
- 2011: Award of the Lviv Archeparchy of the UGCC "For the study of the history of the Ukrainian Greek Catholic Church"
- 2014: Award of the Rector of the Ukrainian Catholic University "For Exceptional Achievements in Scientific research"
- 2015: "Feniks" award from the Stowarzyszenia Wydawców Katolickich in the category of "Church Sciences" for the publication of the monograph "Kościoly wschodnie w państwie polsko-litewskim w procesie przemian i adaptacji: metropolia kijowska w latach 1458-1795" (Warsaw, Poland)
- 2015: Award at the 55th Competition of the Polish Book Publishers' Association in the nomination "Scientific and popular books (humanities)" for the publication of the monograph in the process of przemian and adaptation: metropolia kijowska in the years 1458-1795" (Warsaw, Poland)
- 2016: Alexander Prize of the Gudziak Family Ad Fontes
- 2019: Rector's Award of the Ukrainian Catholic University for high academic standards in scientific research was given to the collective monograph "At the Crossroads of Cultures: The Monastery and Church of the Holy Trinity in Vilnius (collective monograph)"

== Honoring ==
On 24-26 September 2021, an international scientific conference "Supraśl Monastery and the Elites of the Rzeczpospolita" was held in Supraśl (Poland), dedicated to the memory of Professor of the Ukrainian Catholic University Ihor Skochylias. During the meeting, the volume "Zamoiskyi provintsiinyi sobor Rus'koi Uniinoi Tserkvy 1720 roku" ("Kyivske khrystyianstvo" publishing series) was presented, which became the last large-scale work of Professor Skochylias.

The Center for Religious Culture of Ukrainian Catholic University was named after Ihor Skochylias. An oak tree in the Saski Park in Supraśl, Poland, is also named in his honor.

== Sources ==
- Фелонюк А. Ігор Скочиляс // Вісник НТШ. — Число 64. — Львів, 2020. — S. 133—134. — (Наші втрати).
- Гирич І. Науковець і Церква: пам'яті Ігоря Скочиляса (5 квітня 1967 — 20 грудня 2020) // Записки Наукового товариства ім. Шевченка в Америці. Нова серія. — Нью-Йорк, 2021. — Том 2-3. — S. 327—331.
- Пам'яті професора Ігоря Скочиляса // Halytskyi visnyk plius. — 2020. — No. 52 (24 груд.). — S. 3.
- Мадзій І. Життя коротке, а надбання — безцінні // Vilne zhyttia plius. — 2021. — No. 3 (15 січ.). — S. 5. — (Пам'ять).
- Татарський С. Борщівщина колисала його творчий потенціал // Сільський господар плюс Тернопільщина. — 2021. — No. 52 (29 груд.). — S. 7.
- Грабик Л. Світлій пам'яті Ігоря Скочиляса // Галицький вісник плюс. — 2021. — No. 42 (23 груд.). — S. 5.
