= Zhukiv, Ternopil Oblast =

Rural locality in Ternopil Oblast, Ukraine

Coordinates: 49°30′56″N 24°56′27″E

Zhukiv (Ukrainian Жуків), is a major village in Ternopil Raion of Ternopil Oblast, Ukraine. It is located about 8 km north of Berezhany, beside the hill named Huk. Zhukiv belongs to Berezhany urban hromada, one of the hromadas of Ukraine.

It is the native village of the Ukrainian writer Bohdan Lepky. Zhukiv is located on banks of the river Zolota Lypa near Mountain Him, which is the largest mountain in Zhukiv. The population was 828 people in 2014.

== History ==
Until 18 July 2020, Zhukiv belonged to Berezhany Raion. The raion was abolished in July 2020 as part of the administrative reform of Ukraine, which reduced the number of raions of Ternopil Oblast to three. The area of Berezhany Raion was merged into Ternopil Raion.
