= Andrii Chaikovskyi =

Ukrainian writer, public figure, Esperantist (1857–1935)

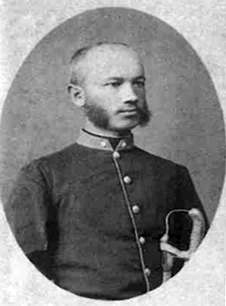
Andrii Chaikovskyi during his military service (1882).

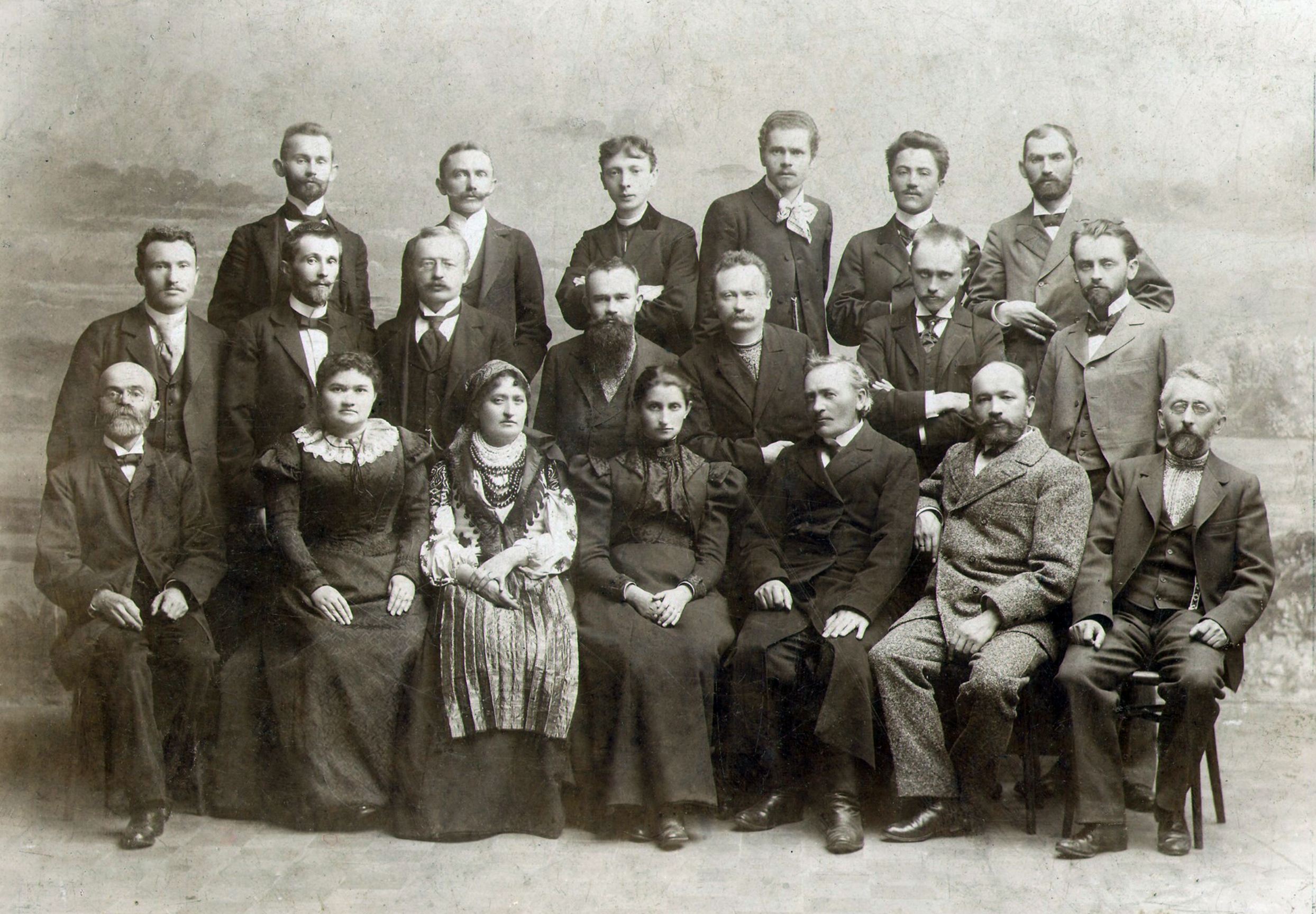
The board and members of the Shevchenko Scientific Society celebrating the 100th anniversary of the publication of Ivan Kotliarevsky's Eneida, Lviv, 31 October 1898: Sitting in the first row: Mykhailo Pavlyk, Yevheniya Yaroshynska, Natalia Kobrynska, Olha Kobylianska, Sylvester Lepkyi, Andrii Chaikovskyi, Kost Pankivskyi. In the second row: Ivan Kopach, Volodymyr Hnatiuk, Osyp Makovei, Mykhailo Hrushevsky, Ivan Franko, Oleksander Kolessa, Bohdan Lepky. Standing in the third row: Ivan Petrushevych, Filaret Kolessa, Yosyp Kyshakevych, Ivan Trush, Denys Lukiianovych, Mykola Ivasyuk.

Andrii Chaikovskyi (Ukrainian: Андрій Якович Чайковський; 15 May 1857, Sambir – 2 June 1935, Kolomyia) was a Ukrainian writer, public figure, Esperantist, doctor of law, lawyer in Galicia. He was a member of the National Democratic Party, later the Ukrainian National Democratic Alliance, one of the organizers of the Ukrainian Sich Riflemen, and a district commissioner of the West Ukrainian People's Republic in Sambir.

== Works ==
- Спомини зперед десяти літ (1892)
- Stories from the collection: Ні разу не вдарив, Краще смерть, чим неволя, Хто винен?, За віхоть сіна, Жаль ваги не має (collections Оповідання (1904 and 1920)
- За сестрою (1907)
- Алкогольні образки (1910)
- Віддячився (1913) – stories from Cossack antiquity for Ukrainian youth
- Петро Конашевич-Сагайдачний (1917)
- З ласки родини (1918, parts 1, 2, 3)
- Козацька помста (1919)
- Олюнька (1920)
- На уходах (1921)
- Олексій Корнієнко (1924)
- Novel Сагайдачний — book one Побратими (1924); book two До слави, part 1 (1929); book three До слави, part 2 (1929)
- Перед зривом — a story about the life of Hetman Bohdan Khmelnytskyi
- Полковник Михайло Кричевський (1937) — the tragic story of a Polish nobleman who sided with Ukrainians in their struggle for freedom.
- Три казки діда Охріма (1927)
- Автократ (1929)
- Четверта заповідь (1930)
- Сонце заходить (1930)
- За чужі гріхи (1931)
- За чужі гроші (1932)
- Чар-зілля (1932)
- Одарка
- Чорні рядки (My memories from 1 November 1918 to 13 May 1919)
- Не піддавайся біді
- Сирітка

== Bibliography ==
- Chaikovskyi Andrii Yakovych / V. A. Kachkan // Encyclopedia of Modern Ukraine [Online] / Eds. : I. М. Dziuba, A. I. Zhukovsky, M. H. Zhelezniak [et al.] ; National Academy of Sciences of Ukraine, Shevchenko Scientific Society. – Kyiv : The NASU institute of Encyclopedic Research, 2024.
- Чайковський Андрій // Українська мала енциклопедія : 16 кн. : у 8 т. / проф. Є. Онацький. — Накладом Адміністратури УАПЦ в Аргентині. — Буенос-Айрес, 1967. — Т. 8, кн. XVI : Літери Уш — Я. — С. 2039-2040. — 1000 екз.
