= Vasyl Paneiko =

Ukrainian diplomat

Vasyl Paneiko Василь Лукич Панейко

Secretary of State of Foreign Affairs of the West Ukrainian People's Republic
- In office 1918–1919
- Succeeded by: Lonhyn Tsehelsky

Personal details
- Born: 1883 Zlotshev
- Died: 29 May 1956 (aged 72–73) Caracas
- Education: University of Lviv

Vasyl Paneiko (Ukrainian: Василь Лукич Панейко) (1883, Zlotshev – May 29, 1956, Caracas) was a Ukrainian politician, journalist and diplomat. Secretary of State of Foreign Affairs of the West Ukrainian People's Republic (1918–1919).

== Education ==
He graduated from the Faculty of Law of the University of Lviv. He was a member of the Ukrainian National Democratic Alliance. In 1907 the newspaper Dilo collaborator. In the years 1912-1918 the chief editor Dilo (Lviv during the occupation by the Russian army in 1914-15 published in Vienna). One of the editors of the weekly Ukrainische Korrespondenz. In November 1918, elected Secretary of State of Foreign Affairs of the West Ukrainian People's Republic. In 1919, vice-president of the Ukrainian delegation to the Paris Peace Conference, from December 1919 President of the West Ukrainian People's Republic delegation at the conference.

Since 1920 he was a foreign correspondent Dilo. From 1925, he appeared biweekly Dilo and Politics in Lviv, and later was a correspondent for Dilo in Paris. In the thirties of the twentieth century. Removed from political life. In 1945 he emigrated to the United States, and in 1955, to Venezuela.

== Author ==
- Панейко В. З'єдинені держави Східної Европи: Галичина в Україні супроти Польщі й Росії.— Відень: Накладом автора, 1922. — 82 с.

== Bibliography ==
- Décisions du Conseil Suprême sur la Galicie Orientale: Les plus importants documents, intro M. Lozynsky (Paris 1919)
- Notes présentées par la Délégation de la République Ukrainienne à la Conférence de la Paix à Paris (Paris 1919)
- Lozyns’kyi, M. Halychyna v rr. 1918–1920 (Vienna 1922; repr New York 1970)
- Lundgreen-Nielsen, K. The Polish Problem at the Paris Peace Conference: A Study of the Policies of the Great Powers and the Poles, 1918–1919 (Odense 1979)
