= Vysotsko =

Rural locality in Lviv Oblast, Ukraine

- Village
- Location within Lviv Oblast Location within Ukraine
- Coordinates: 50.0261°N 25.0242°E
- Country: Ukraine
- Oblast: Lviv
- Raion: Zolochiv
- Area: 1,866 km^{2} (720 sq mi)
- Population: 602
  - Density: 322/km^{2} (830/sq mi)

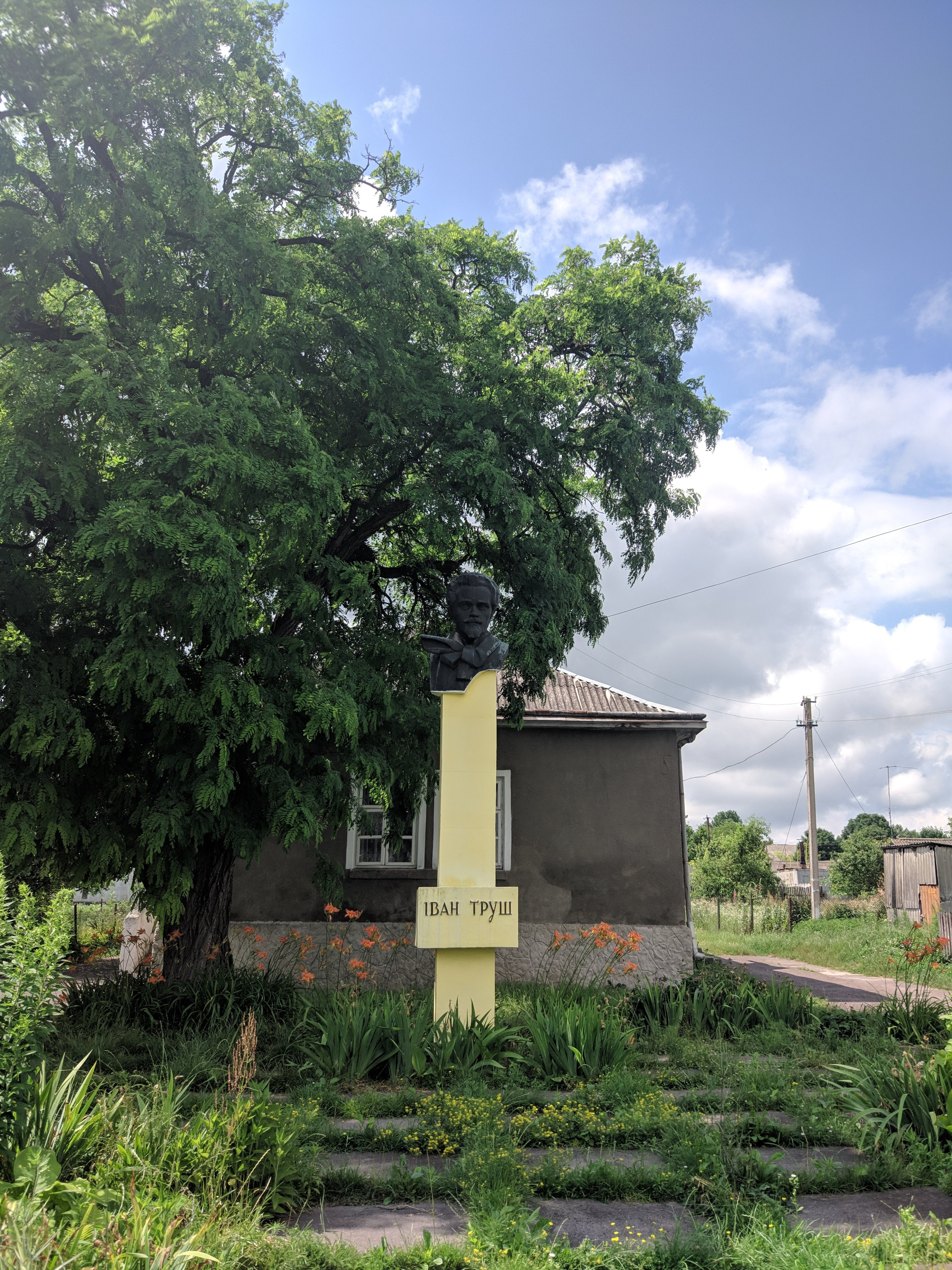
Monument to Ivan Trush in Vysotko

Vysotsko (Ukrainian: Висоцько) is a village (selo) in Zolochiv Raion, Lviv Oblast, in western Ukraine. It belongs to Zabolottsi rural hromada, one of the hromadas of Ukraine.

From 1918 to 1939 the village was in Tarnopol Voivodeship in Poland.

Until 18 July 2020, Vysotsko belonged to Brody Raion. The raion was abolished in July 2020 as part of the administrative reform of Ukraine, which reduced the number of raions of Lviv Oblast to seven. The area of Brody Raion was merged into Zolochiv Raion.

== Archaeological site ==
In 1898 remains of a Hallstatt and La Tène-era burial were excavated in the area by Izydor Szaraniewicz. In 1929 another expedition to the site was perormed by Tadeusz Sulimirski. In 1899 Mykhailo Hrushevsky studied a nearby fortification and graves from princely times.

== Notable personalities ==
- Ivan Trush
