= Tsyhany, Ukraine =

Tsyhany Цигани
- Village
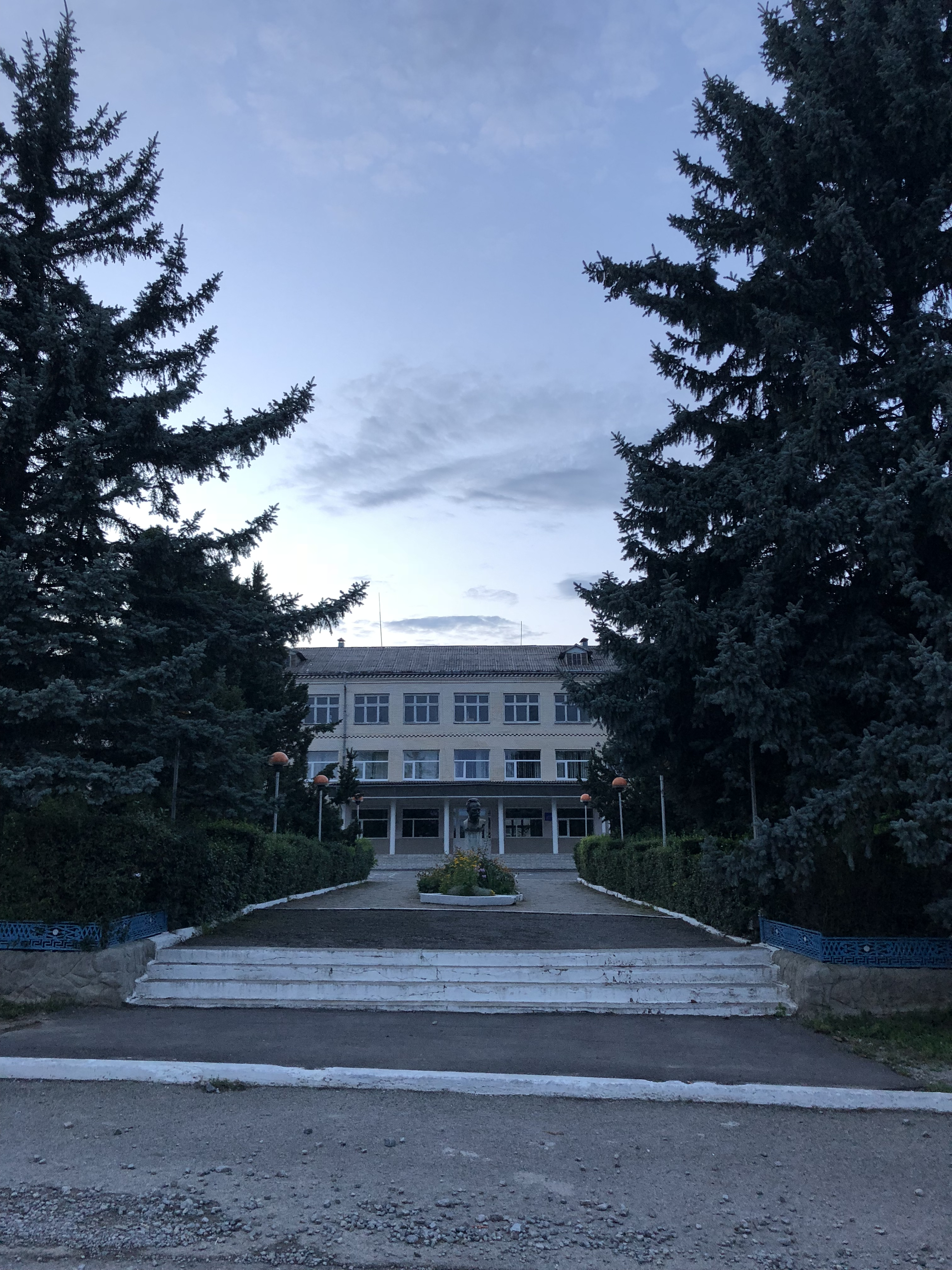

- Location in Ukraine
- Coordinates: 48°52′07″N 26°06′03″E
- Country: Ukraine
- Oblast: Ternopil Oblast
- District: Chortkiv Raion
- Hromada: Borshchiv urban hromada

Population
  - Total: 1,511
- Time zone: UTC+2 (EET)
  - Summer (DST): UTC+3 (EEST)
- Postal code: 48712

Tsyhany (Ukrainian: Цигани; Polish: Cygany), a village in Ukraine, is located within Chortkiv Raion of Ternopil Oblast. It belongs to Borshchiv urban hromada, one of the hromadas of Ukraine.

== Religion ==
- Saints Peter and Paul church (1903, brick, UGCC).

== Notable residents ==
- Omelian Hlibovytskyi (1856–1905), Ukrainian Greek Catholic priest, novelist, publicist, public figure
- Ihor Skochylias (1967–2020), Ukrainian historian, and local historian
