= Stricha =

Proto-Ukrainian mythical figure

Origin
- Country: Ukraine
- Region: Carpathian Mountains

Stricha or Dolya (Ukrainian: Стріча or Ukrainian: Доля) is the proto-Ukrainian goddess of good fate, one of the incarnations of Rozhanytsa, who foretells the future of married couples, the birth of children (incarnation of new souls). She determines the purpose of a person, therefore, at birth, she endows babies with all the virtues, predicts their future. Fate, like Mokosha, is the embodiment of Mother Lada. She knows about everything that was, is and will be with each person. Fate determines what each human soul needs to learn when it returns to Earth for the next time.

== Description ==
Dolya should always be propitiated by bringing her gifts. As a donation to Dolya, the following was brought: porridge, wool, threads, wine, handkerchiefs, dishes, ribbons, bread, honey, milk.

The goddess of good fortune appears in the form of a beautiful young woman who spins a strong, even golden thread of human destiny. Dolya (Ukrainian: Доля) is the ukrainian word for fate. Symbols of Dolya are a spindle, a spinning wheel, a ball of threads.

Doli-Strichi is dedicated to the day of the Annunciation (February 1-2 according to the restored pagan calendar). On this day, according to popular belief, the Goddess of Winter meets the Goddess of Spring. Spring was imagined in the form of a young girl, decorated with flowers and potions, a joyful and sunny beauty, and Winter - in the form of an evil old woman in snowy furs, from whom the cold, frost blows. Two rivals compete to see who will beat whom. How the weather changes on this day determines what this year's summer and harvest will be like. As a rule, this is the first winter day on which the sun shines extremely brightly. So, astronomically, the Feast of the Annunciation comes much earlier than the Orthodox Church, which borrowed the name of this holiday.Western Slavs, still have the custom of inviting the Goddess Strycha to a feast on this day, treating her to a good meal. Then she will be generous and give happiness to the owners.

On this day, songs are sung to pray for warmth and a good summer, fortune-telling takes place. "Dolenka, Dole, give me grain, warm clothes and the strength of a bear."

Strechy's opponent is Nestricha, that is, evil fate (misfortune). There is a belief that Nestricha should be chased away and sent to her enemies. Nestricha befalls people who betray the Native Faith, the laws of Righteousness, and the ancestral Custom.

In autumn, on the holiday of Fate (November 24), girls prepare porridge and carry it in a pot over the threshold, calling her :"Dole, Dole, come to us to eat porridge!".

In the Book of Veles, Dolya-Stricha also has the name Yasna. She is mentioned at the birth of Dazhbo's grandchildren "already Yasna weaves to him" (plate 16), that is, we are talking about the thread of life that the Goddess weaves; Stricha (Perunytsia) is also a female lightning power next to Perun, representing the male thundering power (Boards 7-B, 28).

== Serbian Mythology ==
Srecha (English: happiness, luck) is the Serbian goddess of fate. She spins the thread of life as an assistant to the great goddess Mokosh. Her role is the same as that of the Slavic goddess Dolya, i.e. bringing good luck to the one on whom the goddess Mokosh smiles. And it is also responsible for the protection of flocks and fields of farmers. Her name can also be pronounced as Sreka or Sretya.

== In literature ==
- Stricha - Bohdan Lepky (1899)

== See also ==
- Mavka
- Werewolf
- Povitrulya
