= Krohulets =

Krohulets Крогулець
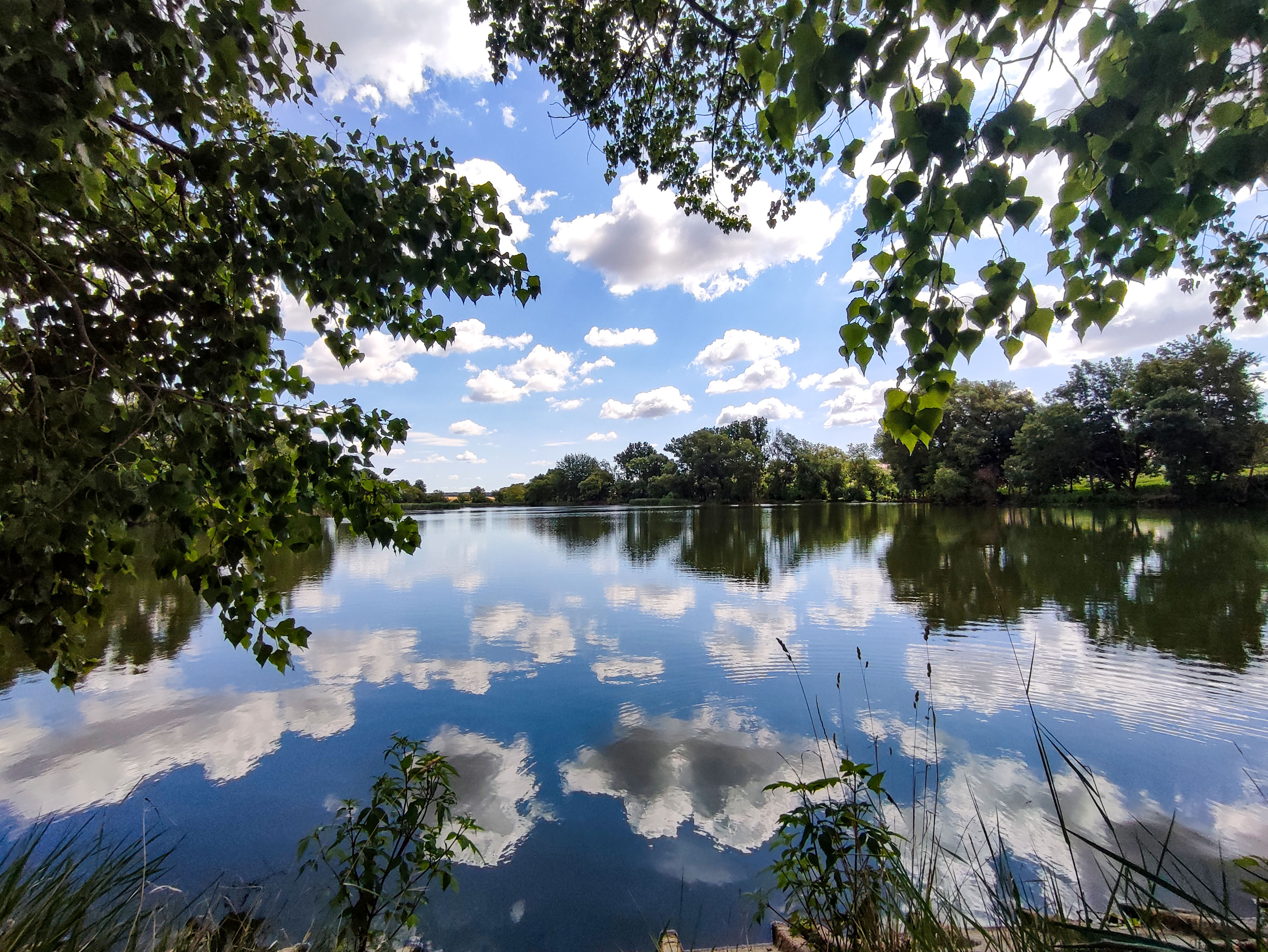
- Pond in Krohulets

- Location in Ternopil Oblast Krohulets (Ukraine)
- Coordinates: 49°6′1″N 26°0′25″E
- Country: Ukraine
- Oblast: Ternopil Oblast
- Raion: Chortkiv Raion
- Hromada: Vasylkivtsi Hromada

Population
  - Total: 869
- Time zone: UTC+2 (EET)
  - Summer (DST): UTC+3 (EEST)
- Postal code: 48256

Krohulets (Ukrainian: Крогулець, Polish: Krogulec) is a village in Ukraine, Ternopil Oblast, Chortkiv Raion, Vasylkivtsi rural hromada.

== History ==
On 3 March 1578, King Stephen Báthory granted Stanislav Kopychynetskyi the privilege of founding a town under German (Teutonic) law on his own land, simply called Krohulets, located on the Nichlava River and near the Visiencha Forest.

From 24 July 2015, Krohulets has been a member of the Vasylkivtsi rural hromada.

After the liquidation of the Husiatyn Raion on 19 July 2020, the village became part of the Ternopil Raion.

== Religion ==
Church of Saint Volodymyr the Great

- Saint Paraskeva church with a bell tower (18th century, OCU; wooden; reconstructed; architectural monuments of national importance)
- Saint Volodymyr church (2008; UGCC)

== Notable residents ==
- Omelian Hlibovytskyi (1857–1905), Ukrainian Greek Catholic priest, novelist, publicist, public figure
- Bohdan Lepky (1872–1941), Ukrainian writer, poet, scholar, public figure, and artist
- Sylvester Lepkyi (1845–1901), Ukrainian writer, religious and public figure

== Sources ==
- (in Ukrainian) Мельничук Б., Уніят В., Крогулець // Ternopil Encyclopedic Dictionary: in 4 v. / editorial board: H. Yavorskyi and other, Ternopil: "Zbruch", 2005, V. 2: К—О, S. 246. — ISBN 966-528-199-2.
- (in Ukrainian) Мельничук Б., Уніят В., Щавінський, В., Крогулець // Ternopil Oblast. History of cities and villages: in 3 v. / Ternopil: "Terno-graph", 2014, V. 2: Г—Л, S. 74—76. — ISBN 978-966-457-228-3.
- "Krogulec". Geographical Dictionary of the Kingdom of Poland (in Polish). 4. Warszawa: Kasa im. Józefa Mianowskiego. 1883. p. 680.
