= Osyp Makovei =

Ukrainian writer, translator, and public figure (1867–1925)

- Осип Маковей
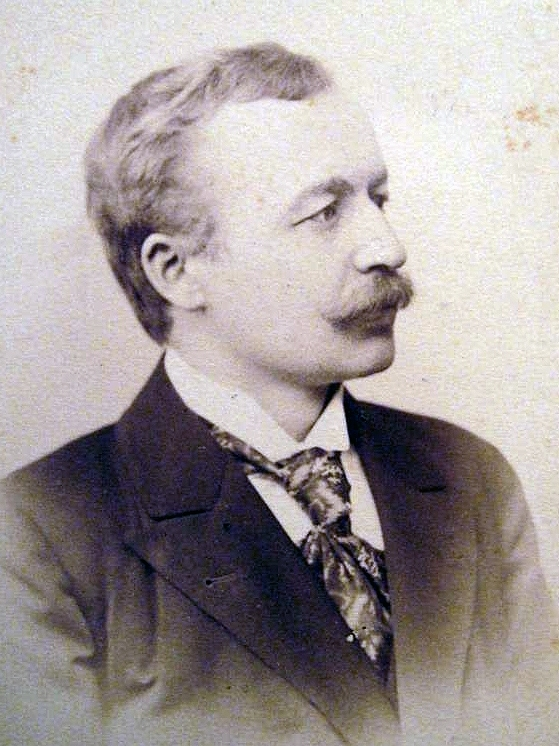
- Born: Osyp Stepanovych Makovei; 23 August 1867; Yavoriv, Austria-Hungary (now Ukraine)
- Died: 21 August 1925 (aged 57); Zalishchyky, Second Polish Republic (now Ukraine)
- Education: University of Lviv, University of Vienna

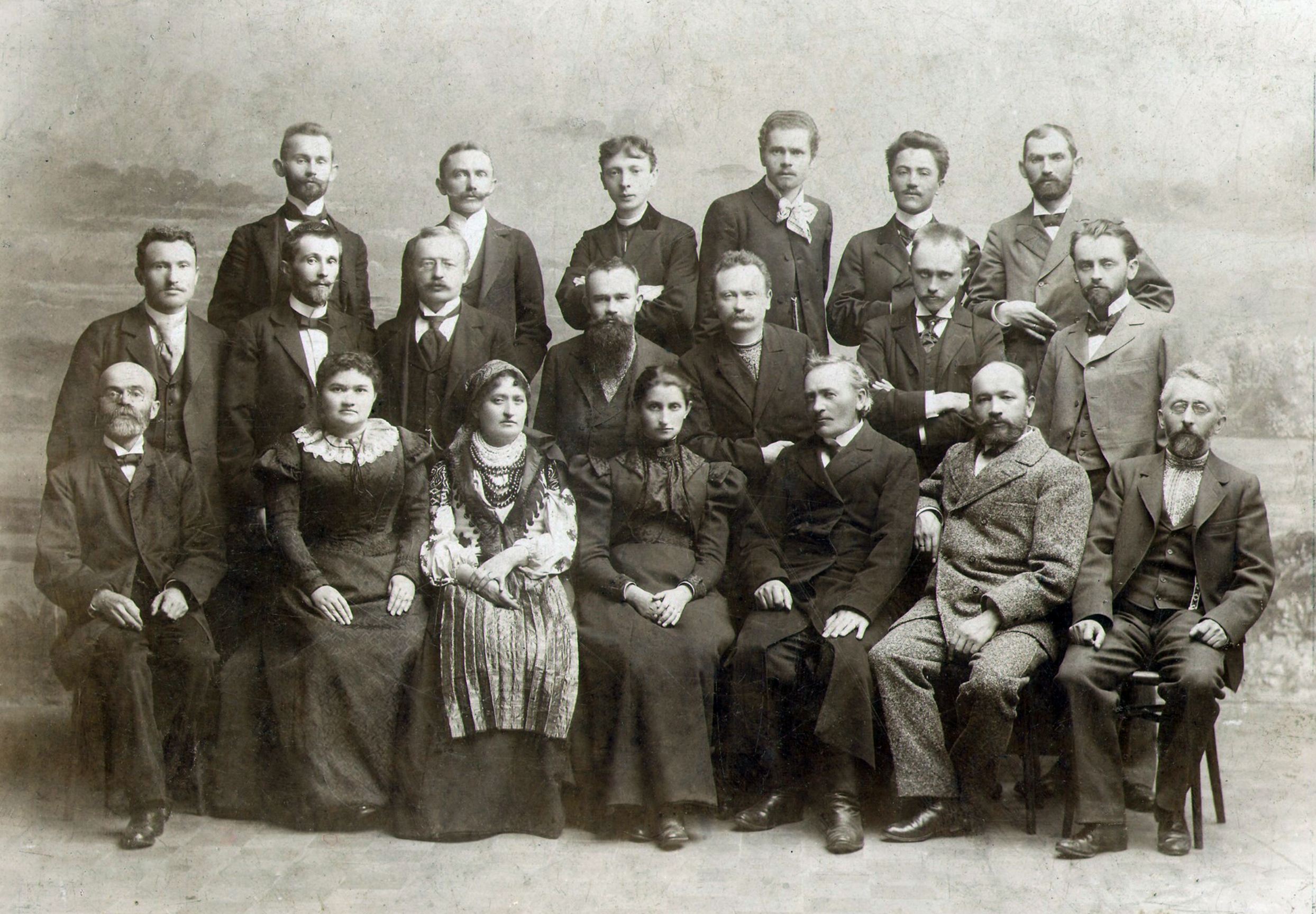
The board and members of the Shevchenko Scientific Society celebrating the 100th anniversary of the publication of Ivan Kotliarevsky's Eneida, Lviv, 31 October 1898: Sitting in the first row: Mykhailo Pavlyk, Yevheniya Yaroshynska, Natalia Kobrynska, Olha Kobylianska, Sylvester Lepkyi, Andrii Chaikovskyi, Kost Pankivskyi. In the second row: Ivan Kopach, Volodymyr Hnatiuk, Osyp Makovei, Mykhailo Hrushevsky, Ivan Franko, Oleksandr Kolessa, Bohdan Lepky. Standing in the third row: Ivan Petrushevych, Filaret Kolessa, Yosyp Kyshakevych, Ivan Trush, Denys Lukiianovych, Mykola Ivasyuk.

Osyp Makovei (Ukrainian: Осип Степанович Маковей; 23 August 1867 – 21 August 1925) was a Ukrainian writer, critic, literary historian, publicist, translator, and educator.

== Biography ==
Osyp Makovei was born on 23 August 1867 in Yavoriv, now in the Lviv Oblast of Ukraine.

In 1887 he graduated from the Lviv Ukrainian Gymnasium, in 1893 from University of Lviv, and in 1899 from the University of Vienna.

In 1885, he met Ivan Franko, who helped him publish his translated poem and later his own poem "Zakazani yabluka" in the Zoria magazine.

In 1891, he collaborated with the newspapers Dilo and Narodna Chasopys, and in 1894–1899 he was the editor of Zoria and Bukovyna, and edited the journal Literaturno-naukovyi vistnyk together with Ivan Franko and Mykhailo Hrushevskyi. As an editor, he helped Olha Kobylianska, Vasyl Stefanyk, Marko Cheremshyna, Bohdan Lepkyi, and Denys Lukiianovych establish themselves in literature.

In 1897 and 1904, Makovei visited Kyiv, where he met Mykola Lysenko; Makovei corresponded with Lesia Ukrainka and Mykhailo Kotsiubynskyi.

He gained a Doctor of Philosophy degree in 1901 and became a Full Member of the Shevchenko Scientific Society in 1903.

In 1899 he began teaching Ukrainian language and literature at the Chernivtsi Teachers' Seminary. From 1910 he worked at the Lviv Women's Seminary. In 1913–1914 and 1918–1925 he worked as the director of the teachers' seminary in Zalishchyky.

In 1914–1918 he served in the Austro-Hungarian army. Later, he was harassed by the Polish authorities, and in February 1921 he was imprisoned in Chortkiv.

He died on 21 August 1925 in Zalishchyky (now Ternopil Oblast), where he was buried.

== Works ==
Many of his essays, short stories, and feuilletons were published in the magazines Dilo, Bukovyna, Ruslan, and Nedilia.

Published:

- poetry collections "Poezyi Osypa Makovei's" (1895), "Podorozh do Kyiv's" (1897),
- books of short prose "Nashi znakomoni" (1901), "Opovidannia" (1904), "“Pustelnyk z Putny” i ynshi opovidannia" (1909), "Krovave pole" (1921), “Pryzhmurenym okom” (1923),
- poems "Revun" (1911), "Novyk",
- novels "Zalissia" (1897) and "Yaroshenko" (1905),
- songs "Haidamatska pisnia" (1901) and "Striletskyi marsh" (1915).

In 1910, he compiled a valuable collection of "Materiialy do zhytiepysy Osypa Yuriia Hordynskoho-Fedkovycha" (vol. 4), and in 1911 he published a thorough monograph, "Zhytiepys' Osypa Yuriia Hordynskoho-Fedkovycha". In the Notes of the Shevchenko Scientific Society (1903, vols. 51, 54) he published the study "Try halytski hramatyky (Ivan Mohylnytskyi, Yosyp Levytskyi, and Yosyp Lozynskyi)". Makovei was also engaged in collecting folklore and resolutely fought against Muscovism.

Makovei's March of Ukrainian Riflemen (1915) was put to music by Filaret Kolessa and became a popular Ukrainian folk song. Its text mentions, among others, the female fighters of the Sich Riflemen.

Makovei's is the author of literary and critical essays on Olha Kobylianska, Andrii Chaikovskyi, Tymotei Borduliak, Pavlo Hrabovskyi, and Stepan Kovaliv, as well as a series of reviews and commentaries. He was also engaged in collecting folklore and resolutely fought against Muscophilia.

Makovei's translations include some works by Heinrich Heine, Ovid, Sándor Petőfi, Mark Twain, Jerome K. Jerome, Guy de Maupassant, Marcel Prévost, Eliza Orzeszkowa, Stefan Żeromski, and Henryk Sienkiewicz.

== Honored ==
In honor of Makovei, a bust (1956, sculptor V. Mudryi) and a monument (1997, sculptor D. Krvavych) were unveiled in Zalishchyky; memorial plaques were installed; and there is a museum room, a museum-estate, and a memorial corner in Zalishchyky, Yavoriv, and Berezhany. One of the schools in Zalishchyky is named after him.

In 2017, on the 150th anniversary of Osyp Makovei's birth, Ukrposhta issued a postage stamp dedicated to this date. On 23 August 2017, a solemn ceremony of special redemption of the postal miniature was held in the district "People's House" in Yavoriv.

== Sources ==
- Маковей Осип Степанович // Шевченківська енциклопедія: — Т. 4: М—Па : у 6 т. / Гол. ред. М. Г. Жулинський. — Київ : Ін-т літератури ім. Т. Г. Шевченка, 2013. — S. 27–28.
