= Olgerd Bochkovsky =

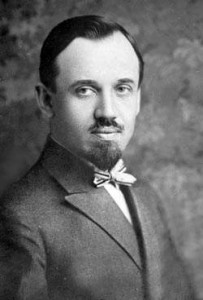

Olgerd Ipolyt Bochkovsky (Ukrainian: Ольгерд-Іполит Бочковський; 1885–1939) was a Ukrainian sociologist, journalist, diplomat and political activist whose political writings were published in Ukrainian newspapers in Canada, Czechoslovakia, Poland and other countries. His selected writings have recently appeared in a three-volume edition. Born in a Polish-Lithuanian family in Dolynska village, Kherson Gubernia (Russian Empire), he studied in St. Petersburg, where he was involved in the socialist movement. After the revolution in 1905 he immigrated to Austro-Hungary and settled in Prague. In 1909, he graduated from Charles University (sociology, faculty of philosophy). At that time he was involved in the movement for abolition of the death penalty, and in this, as well as in the study of small nations movements, Tomáš Garrigue Masaryk was an inspiration for him. Before WWI Bochkovsky worked for several Czech journals, the most influential of which was Slovanský Přehled (Slavonic Review), and also for the Ukrainian newspaper Rada (Council, Kyiv) and the Russian-language Ukrainskaia zhizn’’ (Ukrainian Life, Moscow). At that time he combined political activity in a milieu of immigrants from the Russian Empire with the study of the sociology of the nation. He focused on so called "non-historical / non-state nations" or "enslaved nations" of the Russian Empire.

At the outbreak of World War I, Bochkovsky was imprisoned in Austria as a Russian citizen. His status was changed to that of interned person thanks to Masaryk's help. He was able to work on his first book in nationalities studies "Enslaved nations of the Russian Empire" (Ponevoleni narody Rosiis’koii imperii, 1917). He also was publishing his articles in the "Herald of Union for the Liberation of Ukraine" (Visnyk SVU, Vienna, 1917–1918). During 1918–1921 he served as the secretary of the Ukrainian diplomatic representation in Prague. When (again, with Masaryk’s support) the Ukrainian Engineering Academy in Podĕbrady near Prague was established, Bochkovsky became professor of sociology at the Academy. During the interwar period Bochkovsky elaborated a theory in nationalities studies and named it natiology. First, like Masaryk, he focused on the cultural identity of small Eastern European nations, and then during the late 1920s he started to examine national movements in all of Europe. In the late 1930s he drew attention to Asian and African nations, foreseeing their national revivals. The main idea of his approach was his assessment that nation is the spiritus movens of modern history and that small nations, despite the efforts of imperial policies, would not assimilate. Being both a sociologist and political activist, Bochkovsky’s credo was:

"The obligation of sociology, whose purpose is to forecast, is to state this fact [that the nation is the main protagonist of modern history]. The obligation of politics is to draw actual conclusions from it in order to reconcile liberationist tendencies with the state’s autocratic and centralist traditions. To dream that this triumphant march of the awakened nations could be blocked by assimilationist or any other means would be a reactionary utopia. In this historic duel, the modern nation will defeat the old state just as the young state vanquished the theocracy of the church at the dawn of modern history."

Bochkovsky’s approach toward nationalism resembles those of Miroslav Hroch and Ernest Gellner, which gained popularity half a century later, in the 1980s. He published, mostly in Ukrainian and Czech, dozens of papers, brochures, and books presenting his approach.

Bochkovsky was a member of the Foreign Delegation of the Ukrainian Social Democratic Labour Party, which belonged to the Second International. In 1933–1934 in Prague he headed the Committee of Support for Starving Ukraine and became the editor of the Bulletin Hlad na Ukraine (Famine in Ukraine). In 1933–1934 he published open letters to the former French prime-minister Édouard Herriot who ignored the Famine in Ukraine now often referred to as the Holodomor. Bochkovsky summed up his point of view in an essay entitled "Europa invertebrata" (Spineless Europe). In 1935 the Lviv newspaper Dilo (The Deed) carried his article "The Moral Inflation of Our Age," in which he generalized the moral lesson of the Holodomor for European civilization, pointing out its universal character. In January 1934 Bochkovsky wrote "Famine in Ukraine" for the use of the Ukrainian Press Bureau. Translations into Western languages were planned, but ultimately the project was not carried out.

"The world," he asserted, after a thorough enumeration of publications about the Holodomor in the world press, "was not badly informed about the catastrophic famine in the land of Soviets. It is another matter that it did not react actively to this disaster; it did not give actual assistance to the population dying en masse on that side of the Soviet border."

He described what he saw as the key problem facing the Old Continent at the time of the Holodomor: "Previously Europe would react to what happened and how. Now it is mainly interested in where something happened and to whom. Depending on that, it either remains silent or reacts."

_________________

Ol'gerd Ipolyt Bochkovs'kyi, Vybrani pratsi ta dokumenty [Selected Works and Documents]. Compiled by Ola Hnatiuk and Miroslaw Czech, Zhurnal "Ukraina Moderna" / Vydavnytstvo "Dukh i Litera," 2018-19. 3 vols. Ukraina. Ievropa: 1921-1939 [Ukraine. Europe: 1921-1939]. Vol. 1 – 704 pp., Vol. 2 – 976 pp., vol. 3 in two books – 440 pp., 448 pp.
