= Lonhyn Tsehelsky =

Ukrainian lawyer, journalist and political leader

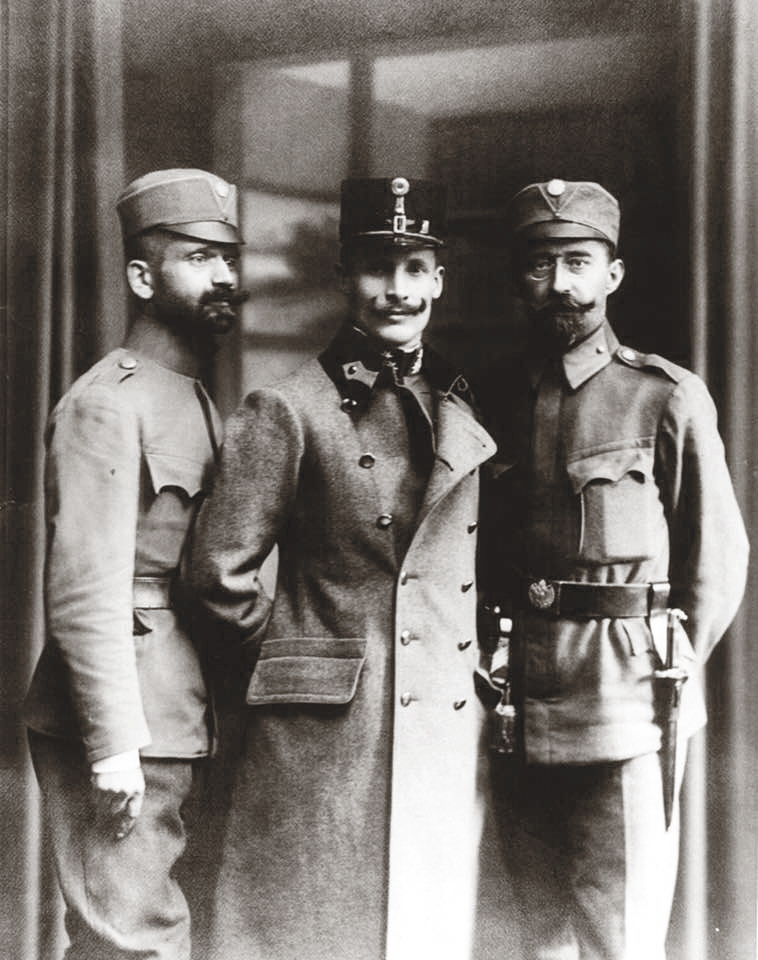
Lonhyn Tsehelsky (right)

Lonhyn Tsehelsky (Ukrainian: Лонги́н Цеге́льський 29 July 1875 – 30 December 1950) was a Ukrainian lawyer, journalist and political leader who served in the Austrian parliament, who became Secretary of Internal Affairs and the Secretary of Foreign Affairs within the government of the Western Ukrainian People's Republic, and who was one of the founders of the Ukrainian Congress Committee of America.

== Biography ==
=== Life under Austria ===
Tsehelsky was born into a priest's family in Kaminka-Strumylova, Austrian-ruled Galicia in 1875. After completing a law degree at the University of Lviv, where he founded a Ukrainian student organization, he became involved in Ukrainian politics, organized agrarian strikes of Ukrainian workers in 1902, edited the largest Ukrainian-newspaper, Dilo, and in 1907 was elected to the Austrian parliament and to the Galician Diet in 1913. When the first world war began he helped to organize the Ukrainian Sich Riflemen, a Ukrainian unit within the Austro-Hungarian Army.

Lonhyn Tsehelsky mentioned in the "Talerhof almanac", as a prosecution witness at the Second Vienna process, which resulted in the condemnation to death of 24 Galician-Russian public figures.

=== Activities during the struggle for independence ===
When western Ukraine became independent he became Secretary of Internal Affairs and the Secretary of Foreign Affairs within the government of the Western Ukrainian People's Republic. In December he was one of the signers of the treaty uniting the Western Ukrainian People's Republic with the Ukrainian People's Republic. Despite the anti-Russian nature of many of his writings, Tsehelsky recommended that the government of the Western Ukrainian People's Republic consider Soviet proposals for cooperation against Poland as long as the Bolsheviks recognized Ukrainian sovereignty. He argued that Ukraine could turn either to the West or to the East and that the former option was impossible because it would mean an alliance with Poland which he considered to be "imperialist" and "reactionary" while the Bolsheviks were not necessarily so. Ultimately Tsehelsky's ideas were rejected because the western Ukrainian leadership did not want to upset relations with the Western Allies.

=== Exile ===
In 1920 he was sent to the United States as a diplomatic representative of the Western Ukrainian government and settled in Philadelphia, where he edited the Ukrainian newspaper Ameryka. Tsehelsky was one of the founders of the Ukrainian Congress Committee of America, a union of 20 Ukrainian organizations within the United States. He died in Philadelphia in 1950.

== Political theories ==
In 1902 Tsehelsky published Rus’-Ukraïna but Moskovshchyna-Rossia (Rus-Ukraine but Moscow-Russia) which had a significant impact on Ukrainian ideas in both Galicia and in Russian-ruled Ukraine. In this book he highlighted differences that he claimed existed between Ukrainians and Russians in order to show that any union between the two peoples was impossible. Tsehelsky claimed that Ukrainians historically wanted self-rule, while Russians historically sought servitude. Tsehelsky wrote that Ukrainians who opposed Ivan Mazepa were traitors and that Ukrainian history consisted of a constant struggle of Ukrainian attempts at autonomy in opposition to Russian attempts to impose centralization.
