= Sylvester Lepkyi =

Ukrainian writer, religious and public figure (1845–1901)

- Сильвестр Теодорович Лепкий
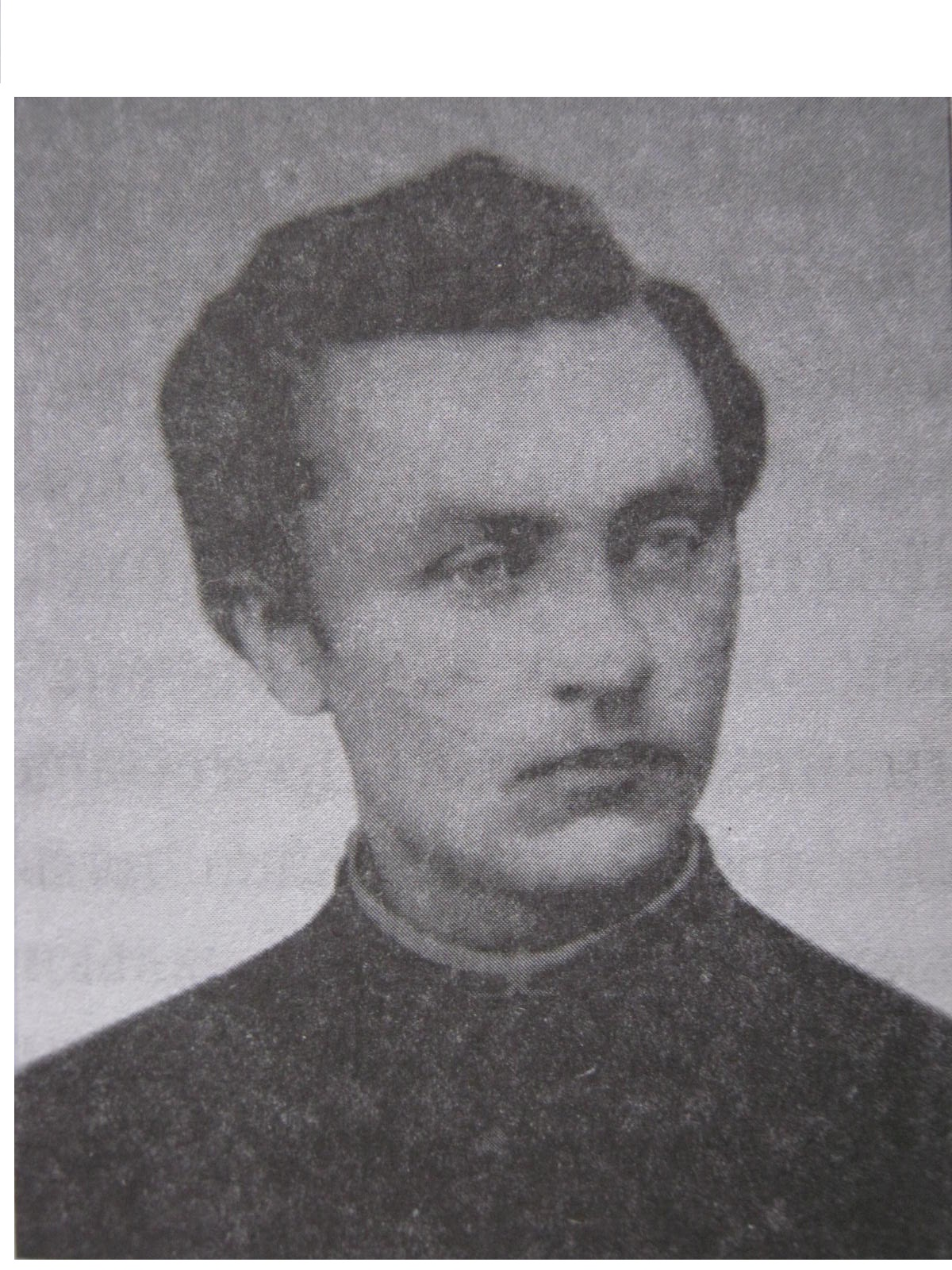
- Born: 31 December 1845; Kulykiv, Austrian Empire (now Ukraine)
- Died: 5 June 1901 (aged 55); Austria-Hungary (now Ukraine)
- Other names: Marko Murava, Borys Boryslav, Vasylyshyn, M-o
- Education: Lviv Theological Seminary
- Occupations: Writer, religious and public figure

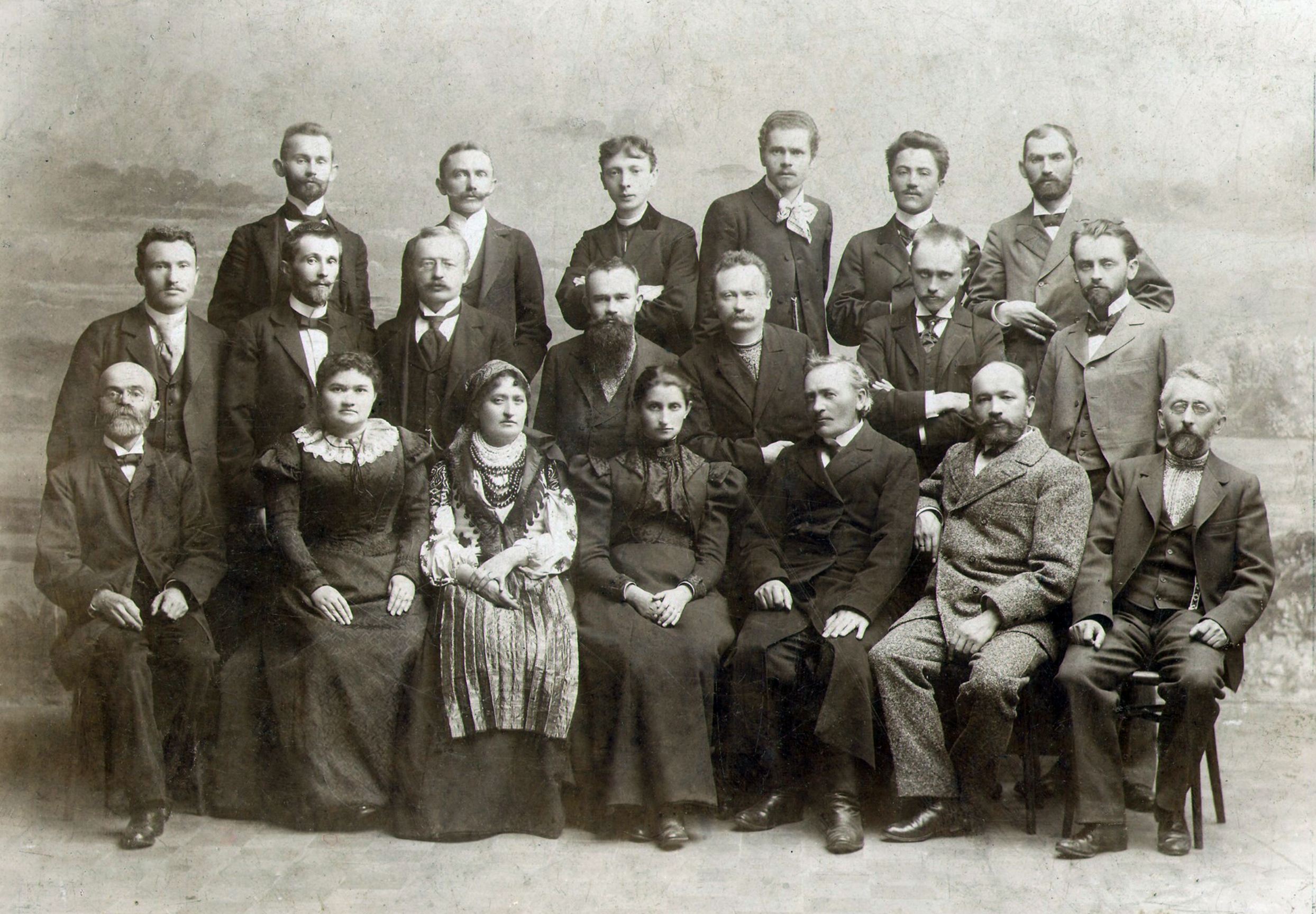
The board and members of the Shevchenko Scientific Society celebrating the 100th anniversary of the publication of Ivan Kotliarevsky's Eneida, Lviv, 31 October 1898: Sitting in the first row: Mykhailo Pavlyk, Yevheniya Yaroshynska, Natalia Kobrynska, Olha Kobylianska, Sylvester Lepkyi, Andrii Chaikovskyi, Kost Pankivskyi. In the second row: Ivan Kopach, Volodymyr Hnatiuk, Osyp Makovei, Mykhailo Hrushevsky, Ivan Franko, Oleksander Kolessa, Bohdan Lepky. Standing in the third row: Ivan Petrushevych, Filaret Kolessa, Yosyp Kyshakevych, Ivan Trush, Denys Lukiianovych, Mykola Ivasyuk.

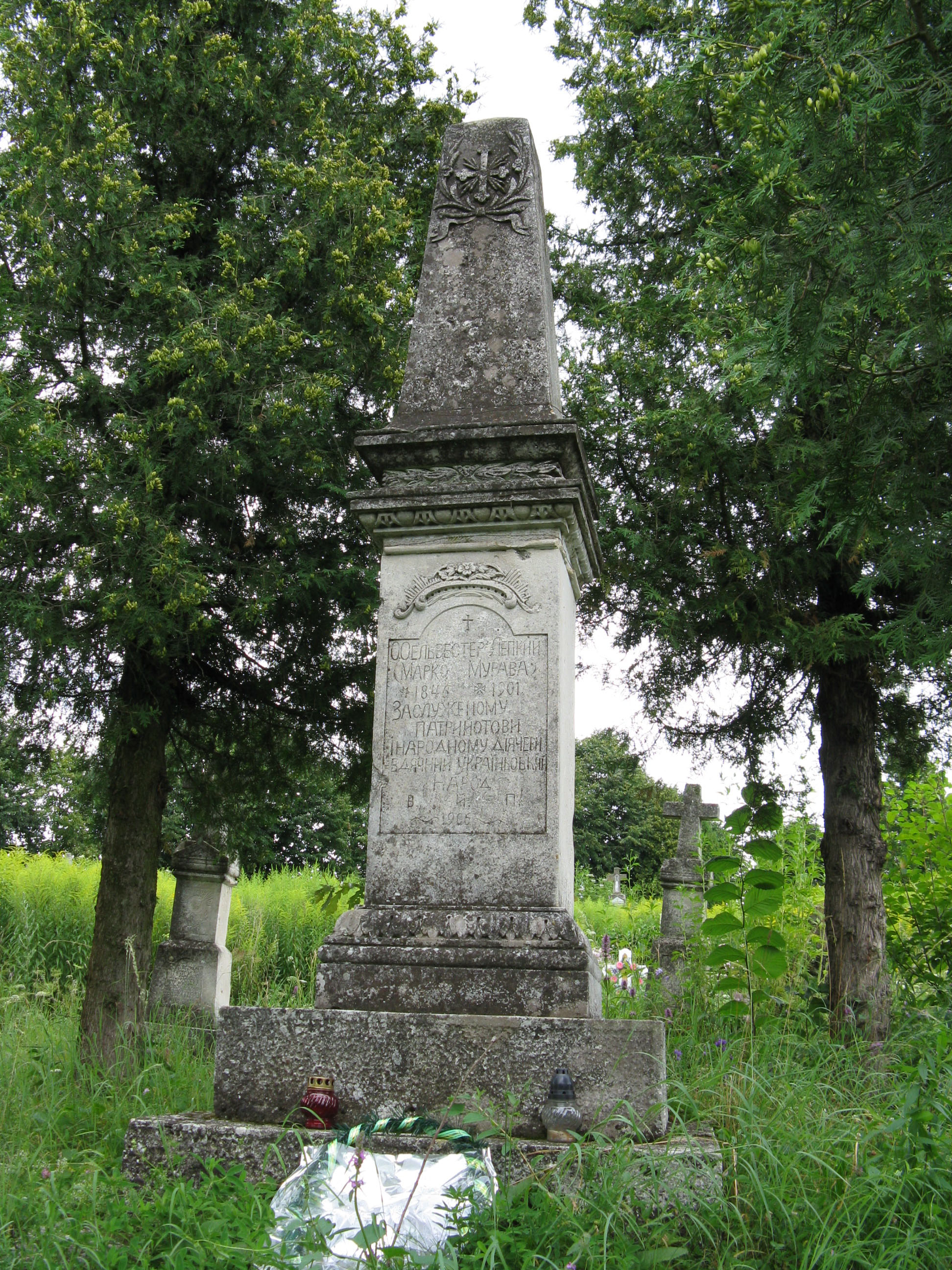
Tombstone of Sylvester Lepkyi, Zhukiv

Sylvester Lepkyi (Ukrainian: Сильвестр Теодорович Лепкий; 31 December 1845 – 5 June 1901) was a Ukrainian writer, religious and public figure. Father of Bohdan, Levko and Mykola, grandfather of Marko Lepkyi.

== Biography ==
Sylvester Lepkyi was born on 31 December 1845 in the town of Kulykiv, now a rural settlement in the Lviv Oblast.

In 1871 he graduated from the Lviv Theological Seminary. In the same year he was ordained a Greek Catholic priest. He served in the parishes of villages in Lviv and Ternopil Regions, in particular, from 1892 he served in Zhukiv.

Lepkyi was a member of the Ruthenian-Ukrainian Radical Party and was also a member of other societies and organizations. In Berezhany, he headed the public self-government body "Selianska Rada" and co-founded branches and reading rooms of the "Prosvita" and "Sich" societies in the villages of Husiatyn and Berezhany districts. He was active in organizing amateur theaters, for which he wrote plays.

Lepkyi died on 5 June 1901 in the village of Zhukiv, now Ternopil Raion in the Ternopil Oblast.

== Works ==
In 1867, in Lviv, together with Kornylo Sushkevych, he compiled the collection "Poezii Tarasa Shevchenka" (vols. 1-2), and in 1886 he edited the butterfly brochures "Odnodnivka Berezhanska".

He was published in the newspapers Dilo, Bukovyna, Zoria magazine, the anthology "Akordy", the collection "Na velyki rokovyny i v pamiat Ivana Kotliarevskoho", and others.

In 1866, he wrote his first poem, "Vspomynky smerti Hryhoriia barona Yakhymovycha, mytropolyta Halytskoi Rusi, batka vitchyny". Later on, his poems focused on raising the national consciousness of the Ukrainian nation and the struggle for its own statehood. In 1903, his son Bohdan Lepkyi compiled and published the collection "Knyzhka horia" in Lviv. Some of his poems were published in 1994 in the collection "Bohoslaven" in Ternopil. He is the author of the words of the church song "Christ is Risen!" ("Radist z neba sia yavliaie...").

Lepkyi's works include articles on philosophy, literature, sociology, economics, and agronomy. He maintained creative ties through correspondence with Osyp Barvinskyi, Osyp Makovei, Vasyl Stefanyk, Ivan Franko, Mykola and Kornylo Ustianovych, and Andrii Chaikovskyi.
