= Hlybochok, Ternopil Oblast =

Hlybochok Глибочок
- Village
- Location in Ukraine Hlybochok (Ukraine)
- Coordinates: 48°49′05″N 25°55′30″E
- Country: Ukraine
- Oblast: Ternopil Oblast
- District: Chortkiv Raion

Population
  - Total: 1,621
- Time zone: UTC+2 (EET)
  - Summer (DST): UTC+3 (EEST)
- Postal code: 48731

Hlybochok (Ukrainian: Глибочок, Polish: Głęboczek), a village in Ukraine, is located within Chortkiv Raion of Ternopil Oblast. It belongs to Borshchiv urban hromada, one of the hromadas of Ukraine.
