= Ivan Trush =

Ukrainian impressionist painter (1869–1941)

Ivan Trush Іван Труш
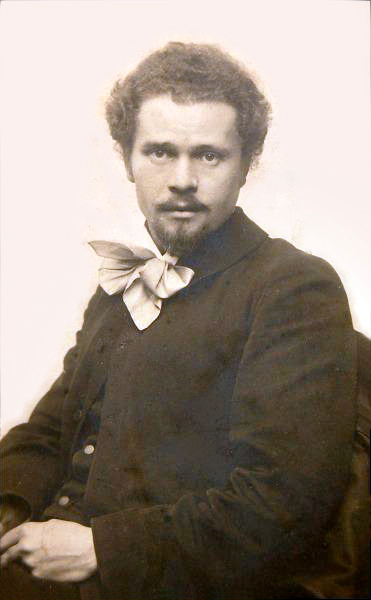
- Ivan Trush as a student at Kraków Academy of Art
- Born: 18 January 1869; Vysotsko, Kingdom of Galicia and Lodomeria, Austria-Hungary (now Ukraine)
- Died: 21 March 1941 (aged 72); Lviv, Ukrainian SSR, Soviet Union (now Ukraine)
- Resting place: Lychakiv Cemetery
- Movement: Impressionism

Ivan Ivanovych Trush (Ukrainian: Іван Іванович Труш, TROOSH; 18 January 1869 – 21 March 1941) was a Ukrainian impressionist painter, a master of landscape and portraiture, an art critic, and active community patron of arts in Galicia or Halychyna – a historical region in western Ukraine. He was a son in law of Mykhailo Drahomanov.

== Biography ==
Trush was born in 1869 in Vysotsko (today in Zolochiv Raion, Lviv Oblast). His studies were undertaken between 1891 and 1897 at the Kraków Academy of Art under Jan Stanisławski and Leon Wyczółkowski. Trush also studied in Vienna (1894) and in Munich (1897).

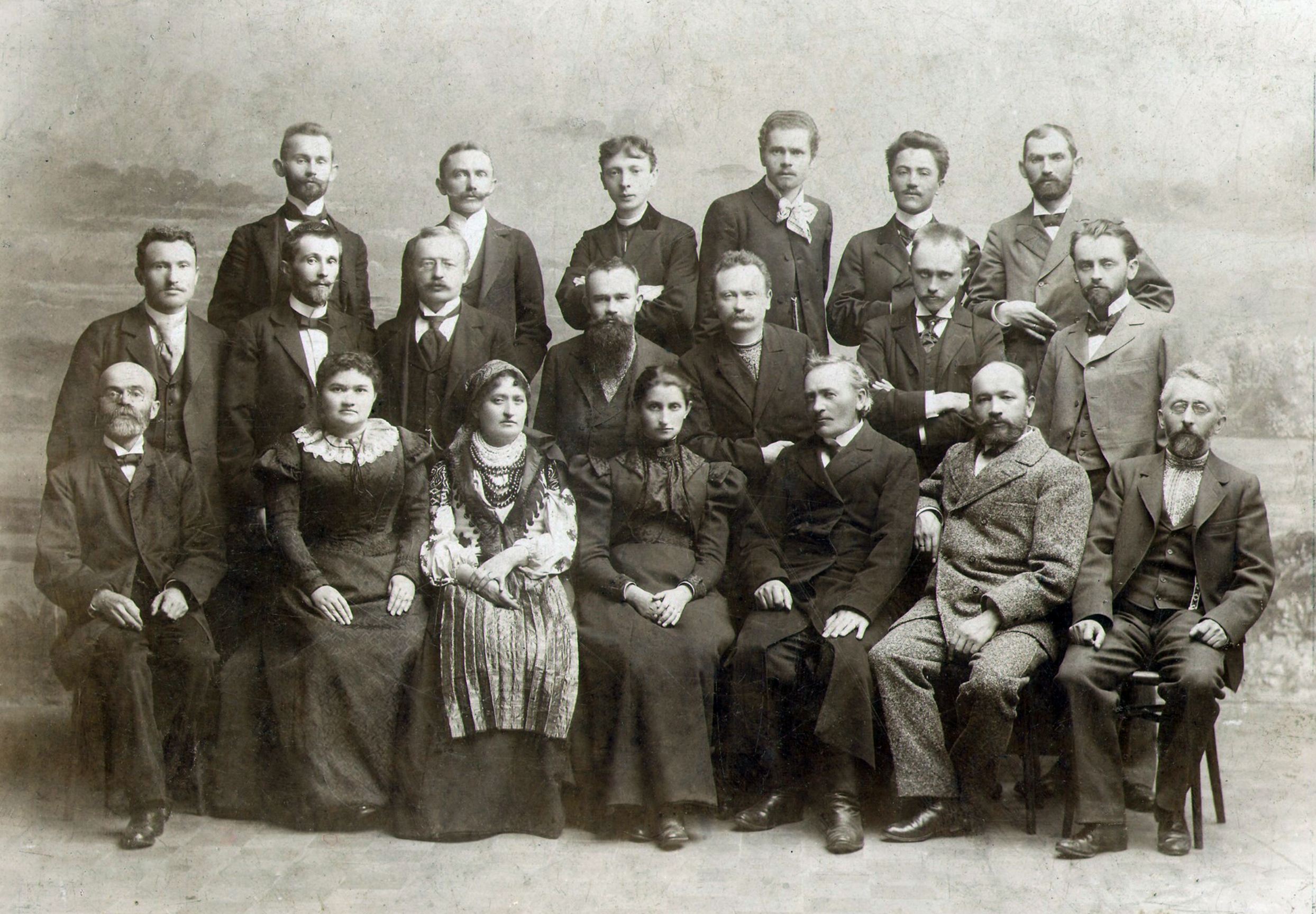
The board and members of the Shevchenko Scientific Society celebrating the 100th anniversary of the publication of Ivan Kotliarevsky's Eneida, Lviv, 31 October 1898: Sitting in the first row: Mykhaylo Pavlyk, Yevheniya Yaroshynska, Natalia Kobrynska, Olha Kobylianska, Sylvester Lepky, Andriy Chaykovsky, Kost Pankivsky. In the second row: Ivan Kopach, Volodymyr Hnatiuk, Osyp Makovej, Mykhailo Hrushevsky, Ivan Franko, Oleksandr Kolessa, Bohdan Lepky. Standing in the third row: Ivan Petrushevych, Filaret Kolessa, Yossyp Kyshakevych, Ivan Trush, Denys Lukianovych, Mykola Ivasyuk.

Starting from 1898, Trush lived and worked in Lviv where he became acquainted with Ivan Franko, a poet and writer. In 1899, his first art exhibit was presented to the public in Lviv. It was at this time that Trush became involved with the Shevchenko Scientific Society, for which he completed "a number of works of art, primarily portraits".

Trush's travels took him to Italy, Egypt, and Palestine. When back at home, Trush founded and organized the first professional art societies in Galicia, the Society for the Development of Rus' Art (1898), the Society of Friends of Ukrainian Art (1905) and its first exhibition of Ukrainian artists, which drew participation from Kyiv-based artists.

The painter's activism, vast and dynamic creative output, numbered over 6,000 works, inspired a rebirth of painting in Galicia.

Trush died in Lviv in 1941.

== Contributions to arts ==
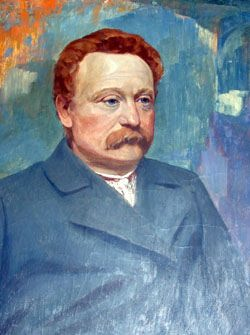
Portrait of Ivan Franko by Trush

Ivan Trush, one of the most prominent Ukrainian impressionists, began his work with the rebirth of Galician painting. He – alongside such figures as ethnographers Volodymyr Hnatyuk and Filaret Kolessa, poet Ivan Franko, the museum's first director Illarion Svientsitsky – played a leading role in the establishment of the Lviv National Museum.

In his lifetime, Trush created a multitude of portraits of famous Ukrainians. Among these are writers Vasyl Stefanyk and Ivan Franko, poet Lesya Ukrainka, political theorist Mykhailo Drahomanov, composer Mykola Lysenko, and linguist P. Zhytetskyi.

His portraits include depiction of Kateryna Hrushevska, a portrait known as "Ukrainian infanta" in art-historical commentary.

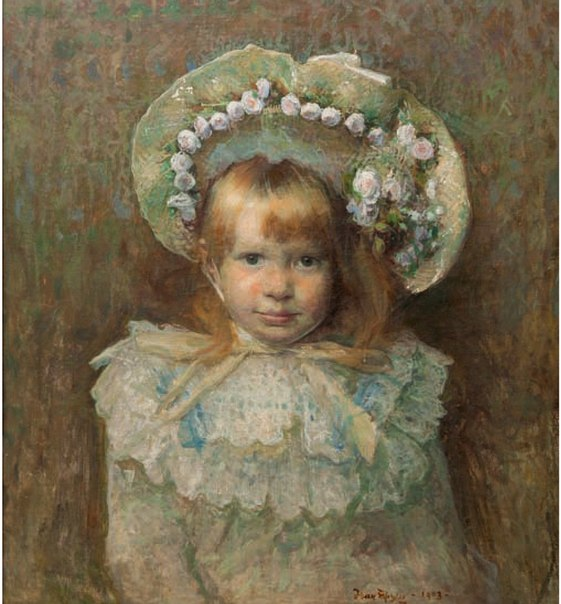
Portrait of Kateryna Hrushevska as a child by Ivan Trush, 1903.

In the late 1930s, Ivan Trush's painting "Landscape from the outskirts of Naples" was presented to the National Museum in Kraków. During the Second World War, more than 120 paintings, including this work by I. Trush, disappeared from the museum without a trace. These paintings were included in the database of war losses of the Ministry of Culture and National Heritage of Poland. In March 2018, this painting and two other works by Polish masters appeared in the list of lots of one of the Warsaw auctions. This finding indicates that the paintings stolen by the Germans probably never left the country, but became objects of looting and theft in post-war Poland.

== Legacy ==
One of the streets in the city of Ivano-Frankivsk is named after him. It connects the city Market Square with Mickewicz Square.

In December 2022 the Mikhail Prishvin street in Kyiv was renamed to Ivan Trush street.

== See also ==
- Liubov Voloshyn
