= Bohdan Lepky =

Ukrainian writer

- Богдан Лепкий
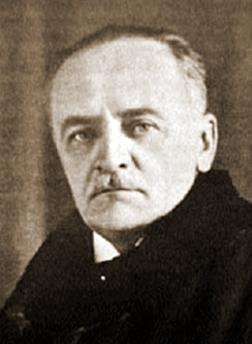
- Born: 9 November 1872; Kryvenke, Galicia, Austria-Hungary (now Ukraine)
- Died: 21 July 1941 (aged 68); Kraków, Kraków District, General Governorate for the Occupied Polish Region
- Burial place: Rakowicki Cemetery

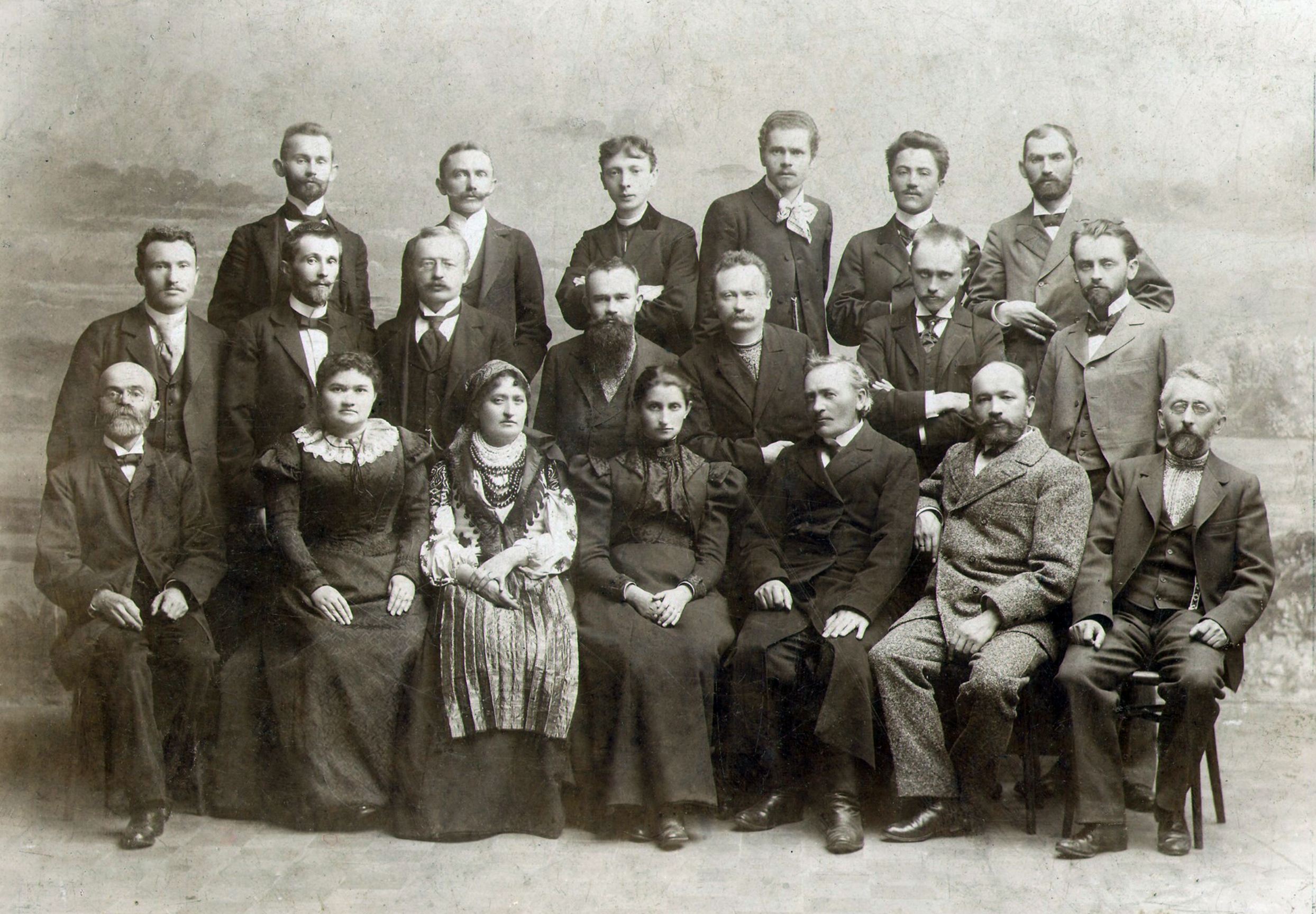
The board and members of the Shevchenko Scientific Society celebrating the 100th anniversary of the publication of Ivan Kotliarevsky's Eneida, Lviv, 31 October 1898: Sitting in the first row: Mykhailo Pavlyk, Yevheniya Yaroshynska, Natalia Kobrynska, Olha Kobylianska, Sylvester Lepkyi, Andrii Chaykovskyi, Kost Pankivskyi. In the second row: Ivan Kopach, Volodymyr Hnatiuk, Osyp Makovei, Mykhailo Hrushevsky, Ivan Franko, Oleksandr Kolessa, Bohdan Lepky. Standing in the third row: Ivan Petrushevych, Filaret Kolessa, Yosyp Kyshakevych, Ivan Trush, Denys Lukiianovych, Mykola Ivasyuk.

Bohdan Teodor Nestor Sylvestrovych Lepky (Ukrainian: Богдан Теодор Нестор Сильвестрович Лепкий, 9 November 1872 – 21 July 1941) was a Ukrainian writer, poet, scholar, public figure, and artist.

He was born on 9 November 1872, in the village of Kryvenke, in the same house where the Polish insurgent Bogdan Jarocki once lived. He spent his childhood in Krohulets. Son of Ukrainian writer and Greek Catholic priest Sylvester Lepkyi.

== Education ==
Bohdan was sent to a normal school in Berezhany at the age of six, where he started in the second grade. In 1883 he started attending the gymnasium at the same town. Lepky would later recall that most young Ukrainian and Polish students were noted for their ethnic tolerance, mutual respect, openness, and active participation in choirs, stage productions, and concerts with a repertoire of both Polish and Ukrainian productions.

After completing the gymnasium in 1891, Lepky was admitted to the Academy of Arts in Vienna but left after a year to pursue a degree in literature. He then went to the Lviv University, studying Ukrainian history and literature, and was a part of the society Vatra and the choir Boyan there before he graduated in 1895. He then returned to the gymnasium in Berezhany as a teacher of Ukrainian and German language and literature.

== Years in Kraków ==
Lepky moved to Kraków in 1899 when Kraków's Jagiellonian University launched a series of lectures on the Ukrainian language and literature and offered a chair to Lepky, who remained there for the rest of his life.

While in Kraków Lepky's house was at 28, Ulica Zielona, where he often hosted many other Ukrainian academics, including Kyrylo Studynsky, Vasyl Stefanyk, Vyacheslav Lypynsky, Mykhailo Zhuk, Mykhailo Boychuk, among others. Lepky also talked with Polish artists such as Kazimierz Tetmajer (1865–1940; a poet and prose writer, and author of the historical novel Legend of the Tatra Mountains), the playwright and painter Stanisław Wyspiański, and the poet Władysław Orkan.

Lepky is best known for his Polish translation of the ancient Ukrainian chronicle Słowo o pułku Igora (The Tale of Ihor's Host, 1905) and for the poem "Zhuravli" (Cranes, 1910), which became known as the song "You see, my brother, my friend, the gray string of cranes flying off into the distance." Lepky later said that one of Wyspiański's plays prompted him to compose Zhuravli: "In the fall of 1910, in Kraków, I was walking home after viewing a theatrical production of Wyspianski's drama Noc Listopadowa. The withered leaves rustled beneath my feet, and departing cranes were trumpeting high above. The poem seemed to come by itself, without my knowledge or effort. My brother Lev Lepky set it to music."

Bohdan Lepky died in Kraków and is buried at the local Rakowicki Cemetery.

== Literary works ==
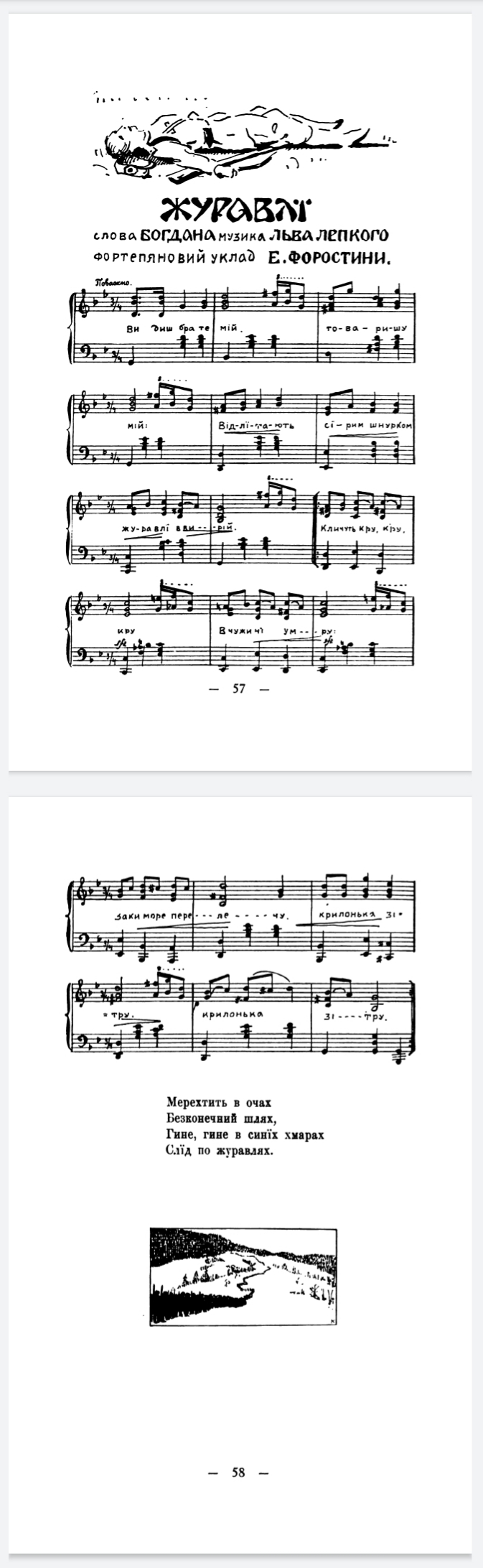
Notes for Lepky's poem Cranes, 1916

- Cranes (You see, my brother - Ukrainian: Видиш, брате мій) - 1910 - the poem became known as the song ("You see, my brother, my friend, a gray string of cranes soaring high into the sky...").
- Song lead (Ukrainian: Заспів)
- Mazepa (Ukrainian: Мазепа) - about Ivan Mazepa, Ukrainian hetman
- Away from life, small grief(Ukrainian: Набік життя журбо дрібна)
- I've Lost Contact with You (prose poem) - 1906 - 2
- Nastya (Ukrainian: Настя) - 1897 - 12
- In the Forest (Ukrainian: В лісі)- 1896 - 9
- Revenge (Ukrainian: Помста) - 1901
- What is That Thunder? (Ukrainian: Що то за грім?) - poem written in 1914 and dedicated to victims of the First World War; later turned into a folk song with musical arrangement by Filaret Kolessa.
- Is it a Storm or is it a Thunder (Ukrainian: Чи то буря, чи то грім) - a patriotic march initially written in 1912 for the Sich sporting society and reworked in August 1914; put to music by Filaret Kolessa and popularized as a song used by fighters of the Ukrainian Sich Riflemen and Ukrainian Insurgent Army.
- Three Portraits - a book of memoirs in which he relates his encounters and creative relationships with Ivan Franko and Vasyl Stefanyk and reminiscences extensively about Władysław Orkan.
- Stricha (Ukrainian: Стріча) - 1899
- Tale of My Life - autobiographic trilogy published between 1936 and 1941

=== English Translations ===
Short story "Why?".

== Family ==
Lepkyi's brother Lev studied at the Krakow Arts Academy and became a creator of Mazepynka cap, which became the standard headgear of Ukrainian Sich Riflemen during the First World War.
