= Kolessa =

Kolessa is a Ukrainian surname. Notable people with the surname include:

- Filaret Kolessa (1871–1947), Ukrainian ethnographer, folklorist, and composer;
- Lubka Kolessa (1902–1997), Ukrainian Canadian classical pianist;
- Mykola Kolessa (1903–2006), Ukrainian composer and conductor;
- Oleksander Kolessa (1867–1945), Ukrainian ethnographer, philologist and politician.
