= Hekking =

Hekking is a surname. Notable people of that name include:

- André Hekking (1866–1925), French cellist
- Anton Hekking (1856–1935), Dutch cellist
- Brock Hekking (born 1991), American football player
- Frank Hekking (1964–2017), Dutch physicist
- Gérard Hekking (1879–1942), French cellist
- Henri Hekking (1902–1994), Dutch physician
