= Rita Mount =

Canadian painter

- Rita Mount
- Born: 7 February 1885; Montreal, Canada
- Died: 22 January 1967 (aged 81); Montreal, Canada
- Education: Art Association of Montreal; Atelier Delécluze; International Circle of Fine Arts, Paris; Art Students League
- Known for: Painter

Rita Mount (7 February 1885–22 January 1967) was a Canadian painter who was renowned for her marine scenes.

== Biography ==
Rita Mount was born in Montreal. At the age of ten she began her artistic studies. She was trained in drawing, workshop and motif, by her cousin Georges Delfosse who had studied at the National Institute of Fine Arts with Joseph Chabert and then at the Art Association of Montreal with William Brymner and Edmond Dyonnet. Afterwards, she distinguished herself during summer classes offered by Maurice Cullen and won a two-year scholarship at the Art Association of Montreal, a private school and museum founded in 1860 (later, the Montreal Museum of Fine Arts). Her training was enhanced by studies and stays abroad.

In 1910, at the age 25, Rita Mount studied at the Atelier Delécluze and at the Cercle Internationale des Beaux-Arts in Paris and at the Art Students League in New York with Frank DuMond. She also took landscape painting classes with John F. Carlson in Woodstock, New York. After graduating, she returned to Canada and opened a studio in Montreal.

In search of landscape, she travelled, exploring towards the Pacific Coast (Banff in 1934, Victoria, Yellowstone Park and Wyoming in 1937) and then the Atlantic side (Cape Breton, Nova Scotia and Gaspé). She gained her reputation for her marine paintings which were the subject of a solo exhibition at the Art Association of Montreal in 1934.

She was an associate member of the Royal Canadian Academy of Arts (she was elected A.R.C.A. in 1938) and the Independent Art Association.

Residing with her sister Marie Mount on Outremont Avenue in Montreal, she died on 22 January 1967 at the Montreal General Hospital after a short illness. She is buried at the Côte-des-Neiges Cemetery in Montreal.

== Exhibitions ==
At the age of 18, she regularly exhibited at the salons of the Art Association of Montreal and, beginning in 1910, at the Royal Canadian Academy of Arts, at the 1939 New York World's Fair, Coronation Exhibition in London, England, and British Empire Exhibition. In 1916–1917, she showed her work at the Bibliothèque Saint-Sulpice, with Claire Fauteux and Berthe Lemoine. In 1934, she had a solo exhibition of her marine work at the Art Association of Montreal. In 1958, her works were shown in a three-woman exhibition alongside Irene Shaver and Vivian Walker. Over sixty-years later the women's work was exhibited again in commemoration of International Women's Day at the marden Art Gallery, in Pointe-Claire Village, Montreal, Québec.

Her work has also been on display in Continental Galleries, Watson Art Galleries, Walter Klinkhoff Gallery, and Morency Frères Ltée., all in Montreal.

== Legacy ==
The works of Rita Mount are in the collections of the Montreal Museum of Fine Arts, the Musée national des beaux-arts du Québec and the National Gallery of Canada. At her death in 1967, her sister entrusted her archives to the Bibliothèque et Archives nationales du Québec. This material, which also includes correspondence, is one of the few collections illustrating the career of a female artist-painter in Quebec.
