= Claire Fauteux =

Canadian painter (1890–1988)

- Claire Fauteux, Montreal, QC, about 1925
- Born: Marie Claire Fauteux; 23 September 1890; Montreal, Quebec, Canada
- Died: 8 July 1988 (aged 97); Montreal, Quebec, Canada
- Resting place: Notre-Dame-des-Neiges Cemetery, Montreal, Quebec, Canada
- Education: Art Association of Montreal; Académie Julian
- Known for: Portrait painter Landscape painter Illustrator
- Notable work: Fantastic Voyage

Claire Fauteux (23 September 1890 – 8 July 1988) was a Canadian painter. Fauteux specialized in portrait and landscape paintings, occasionally creating murals. During World War II, she was interned in France by the Germans during the occupation. While imprisoned, she created a series of illustrations which would be published in her book, Fantastic Voyage.

== Life and work ==
Marie Claire Fauteux was born in Montreal, Canada in September 1890. She studied at the Art Association of Montreal before proceeding to go to Europe, where she continued her studies at the Académie Julian in Paris. She focused on portrait and landscape painting. She returned to Montreal, where she had her first exhibition in 1912 at the Art Association of Montreal. She would maintain a long lasting relationship with the now defunct Art Association, exhibiting her work at the facility through 1947.

In 1916, Fauteux's work was exhibited for the first time at the Royal Canadian Academy of Arts. She exhibited at the Royal Academy three more times in her life. She participated in a group exhibition in 1916–17 at the Saint-Sulpice Library in Montreal. The exhibit also included works by fellow women artists Rita Mount and B. Lemoine. During this time, she taught art at two private schools, the Trafalgar School for Girls in Montreal and the Notre Dame du Sacre Coeur, in upstate New York.

=== World War II imprisonment and Fantastic Interlude ===
Fauteux received a grant from the Women's Art Association of Canada and traveled to France in 1921. While in France, she studied privately with Maurice Denis for two years. In 1927, she visited Rome.

When the Germans occupied France during World War II, Fauteux was imprisoned because she was British-Canadian. Upon arrest, she was held at Besançon. Eventually, she was moved to Vittel. While being held prisoner, she illustrated the day-to-day experiences of herself and her fellow prisoners. After seven months, she was released. She created paintings out of the illustrations she had made and published a book, Fantastic Interlude, about her internment experience.

== Return to Canada ==
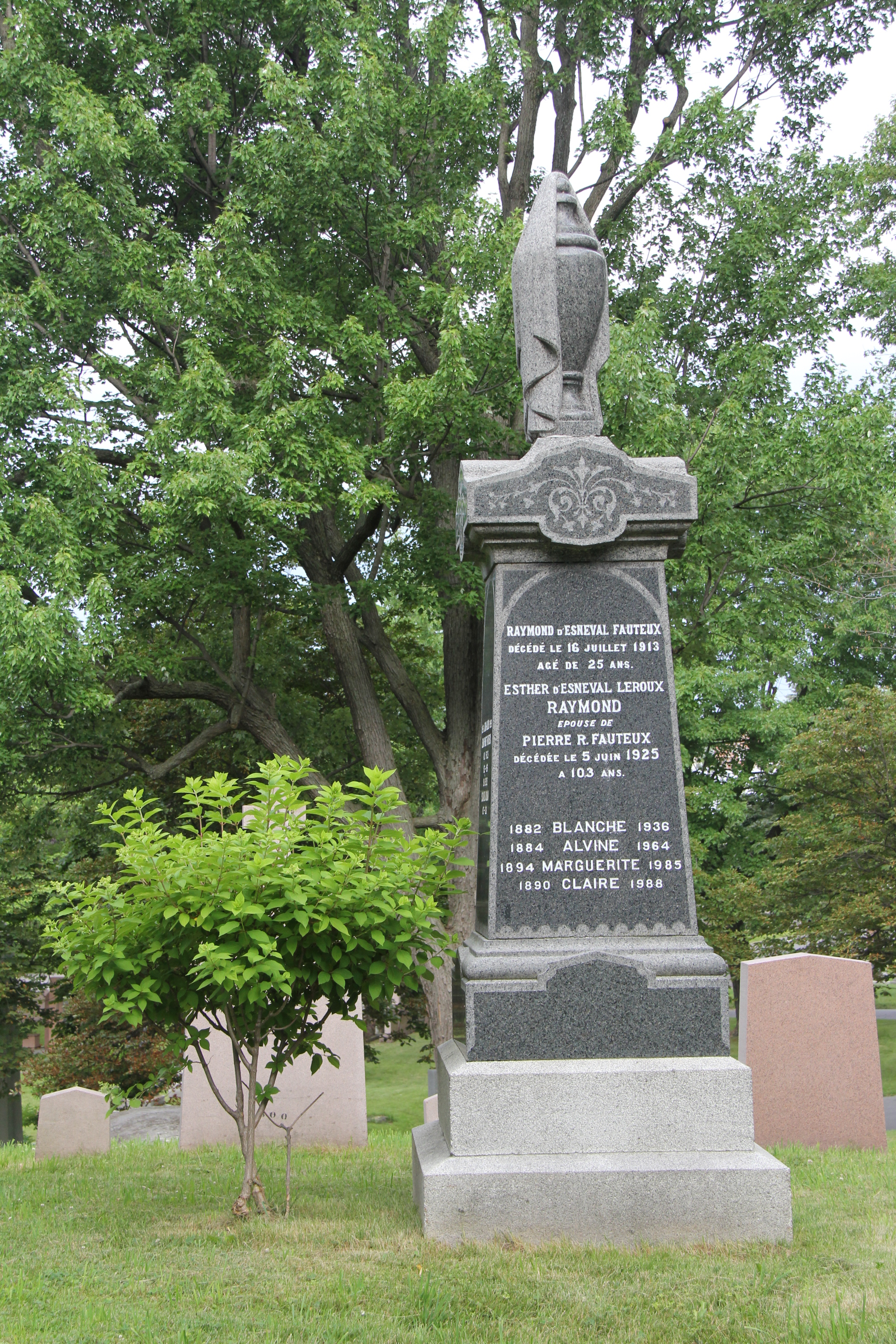
Claire Fauteux's grave at Notre Dame des Neiges Cemetery in Montreal

She returned to Canada in 1947 and exhibited at Montreal's Galerie L'Art français. She became a professor, teaching painting, at the École des beaux-arts de Montréal.

== Later life ==
Fauteux died in July 1988 in Montreal. She was entombed at the Notre Dame des Neiges Cemetery in Montreal.
