= Nicolas Gilbert =

Canadian composer

Nicolas Gilbert (born 1979) is a Canadian composer of contemporary classical music from Montreal, Quebec.

== Career ==
He studied at the Conservatoire de musique de Montréal with composers Michel Gonneville and Serge Provost, earning the Prix avec Grande Distinction in 2003. He also studied at McGill University with composer John Rea. His music has been performed by "the Orchestre Métropolitain, the Vancouver Symphony, the Polish Radio Orchestra, the Estonian National Symphony, the Ensemble Contemporain de Montréal, the Nouvel Ensemble Moderne, the SMCQ, the Molinari Quartet, Quasar, Continuum, and cellist Matt Haimovitz." He won the 2008 "Composer of the year" Opus Prize awarded by the Quebec Music Council. As well, he has won ten SOCAN Awards for Young Composers.

Since 2002, he has also "served as president of the Société Codes d'accès, a non-profit organization that promotes contemporary music". He has been the composer-in-residence for the Chapelle Historique du Bon-Pasteur in Montréal since 2003.
