= Kazimierz Pietkiewicz =

Polish politician (1861–1934)

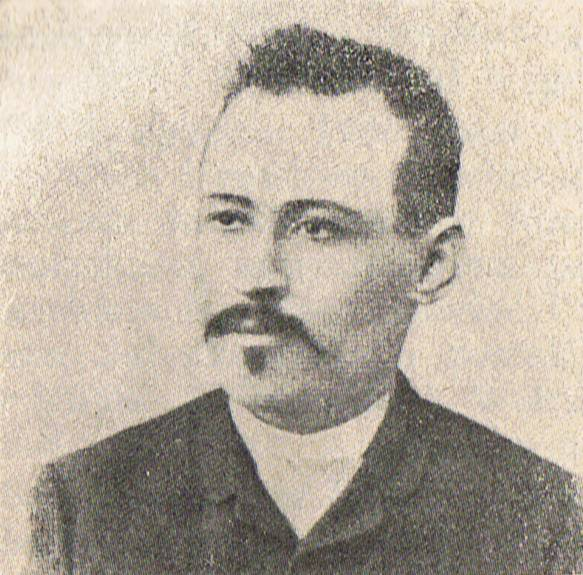

Kazimierz Pietkiewicz (1861 – October 30, 1934 in Anin) was a Polish socialist and independence activist. Member of the Polish Socialist Party, arrested several times by the Russian Empire's and exiled to Siberia. During the Russian Revolution, he was active in socialist organizations in Ukraine. Afterwards he lived in the newly independents Second Polish Republic, where he was involved in various socialist activities.

He translated the Ukrainian song Rage, Tyrants into Polish.
