= Khodovychi =

Rural locality in Lviv Oblast, Ukraine

Khodovychi Ходовичі
- Location in Lviv Oblast
- Coordinates: 49°17′37″N 23°57′38″E
- Country: Ukraine
- Oblast: Lviv Oblast
- Raion: Stryi Raion
- Hromada: Stryi urban hromada
- Time zone: UTC+2 (EET)
  - Summer (DST): UTC+3 (EEST)
- Postal code: 82428

Khodovychi (Ukrainian: Ходовичі) is a village in the Stryi urban hromada of the Stryi Raion of Lviv Oblast in Ukraine.

== History ==
The Lviv-Chernivtsi railroad (built in the early 20th century) passes through the village.

== Religion ==
- Church of the Nativity of the Blessed Virgin Mary (1888).

== Notable residents ==
- Ivan Kolessa (1864–1898), Ukrainian folklorist and ethnographer
- Oleksander Kolessa (1867–1945), Ukrainian literary critic, linguist, social and political activist
- Hanna Bilinska (1927–1991), expert in local singing traditions
- Ivan Bisyk (1948–2018), Academician of Engineering Sciences of Ukraine, chemical engineer and process engineer
- Nadiia Ziabliuk, ethnographer and Honored Worker of Culture of Ukraine.

== Sources ==
- "Chodowice". Geographical Dictionary of the Kingdom of Poland (in Polish). 1. Warszawa: Kasa im. Józefa Mianowskiego. 1880. p. 612.
