= Paul Marcotte (musician) =

Canadian horn player, music pedagogue and music director

Paul Marcotte is a Canadian horn player, music pedagogue, and music director. He is the former director of personnel and principal horn player of the Montréal Chamber Orchestra, and currently serves as horn player and librarian to the Orchestre Métropolitain of which he is a founding member. He is also the current artistic director of the jazz brass ensemble Omnitonique, and has played as a freelance musician with many notable music organizations in the Montreal area, including the Montreal Symphony Orchestra and the Opéra de Montréal.

Marcotte graduated with top honors from the Conservatoire de musique du Québec à Montréal in 1977 where he was a pupil of horn player Joseph Masella. He then pursued further studies in London where he earned performance diplomas in horn performance from both the Royal College of Music and the Guildhall School of Music and Drama. He then studied horn with Philip Farkas at the Jacobs School of Music of Indiana University Bloomington in the United States where he earned a master's degree. He has held teaching posts at more than a dozen institutions during his career, but currently serves as horn professor, director of brass ensemble, and lecturer in harmony at both the Université de Montréal and Sherbrooke College.
