= Pishchany =

Rural locality in Lviv Oblast, Ukraine

Pishchany Піщани
- Location in Lviv Oblast
- Coordinates: 49°17′8″N 23°56′11″E
- Country: Ukraine
- Oblast: Lviv Oblast
- Raion: Stryi Raion
- Hromada: Stryi urban hromada
- Time zone: UTC+2 (EET)
  - Summer (DST): UTC+3 (EEST)
- Postal code: 82476

Pishchany (Ukrainian: Піщани; until Tatarske) is a village in the Stryi urban hromada of the Stryi Raion of Lviv Oblast in Ukraine.

== History ==
The first written mention of the village was in 1515.

== Religion ==
- St. Michael church (wooden, purchased in 1862 in Tukhlia, Stryi Raion).

== Notable residents ==
- Filaret Kolessa (1871–1947), Ukrainian composer ethnographer, folklorist, musicologist and literary critic
- Stepan Matviiv (born 1968), Ukrainian football manager and former player

== Sources ==
- "Tatarsko". Geographical Dictionary of the Kingdom of Poland (in Polish). 12. Warszawa: Kasa im. Józefa Mianowskiego. 1892. p. 225.
