= Natan Rakhlin =

Soviet conductor (1906–1979)

Natan Rakhlin Натан Рахлін
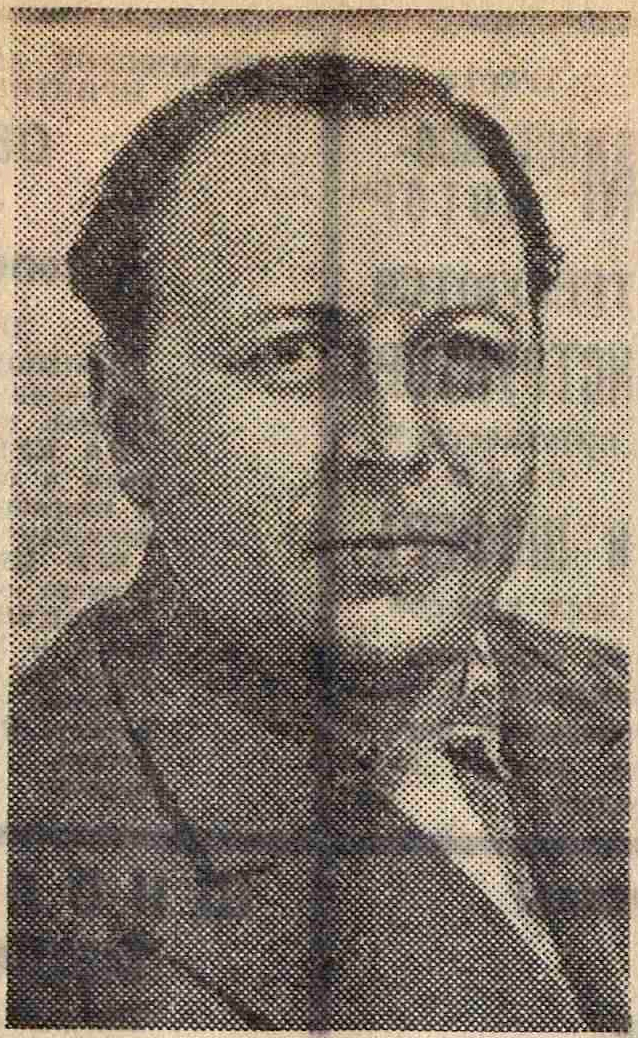
- Rakhlin in 1938

Background information
- Born: 10 January 1906 [O.S. 28 December 1905] Snovsk, Chernigov Governorate, Russian Empire (present-day Ukraine)
- Died: June 28, 1979 (aged 73) Kazan, Tatar ASSR, Russian SFSR, Soviet Union
- Genres: Classical
- Occupations: Conductor; Teacher

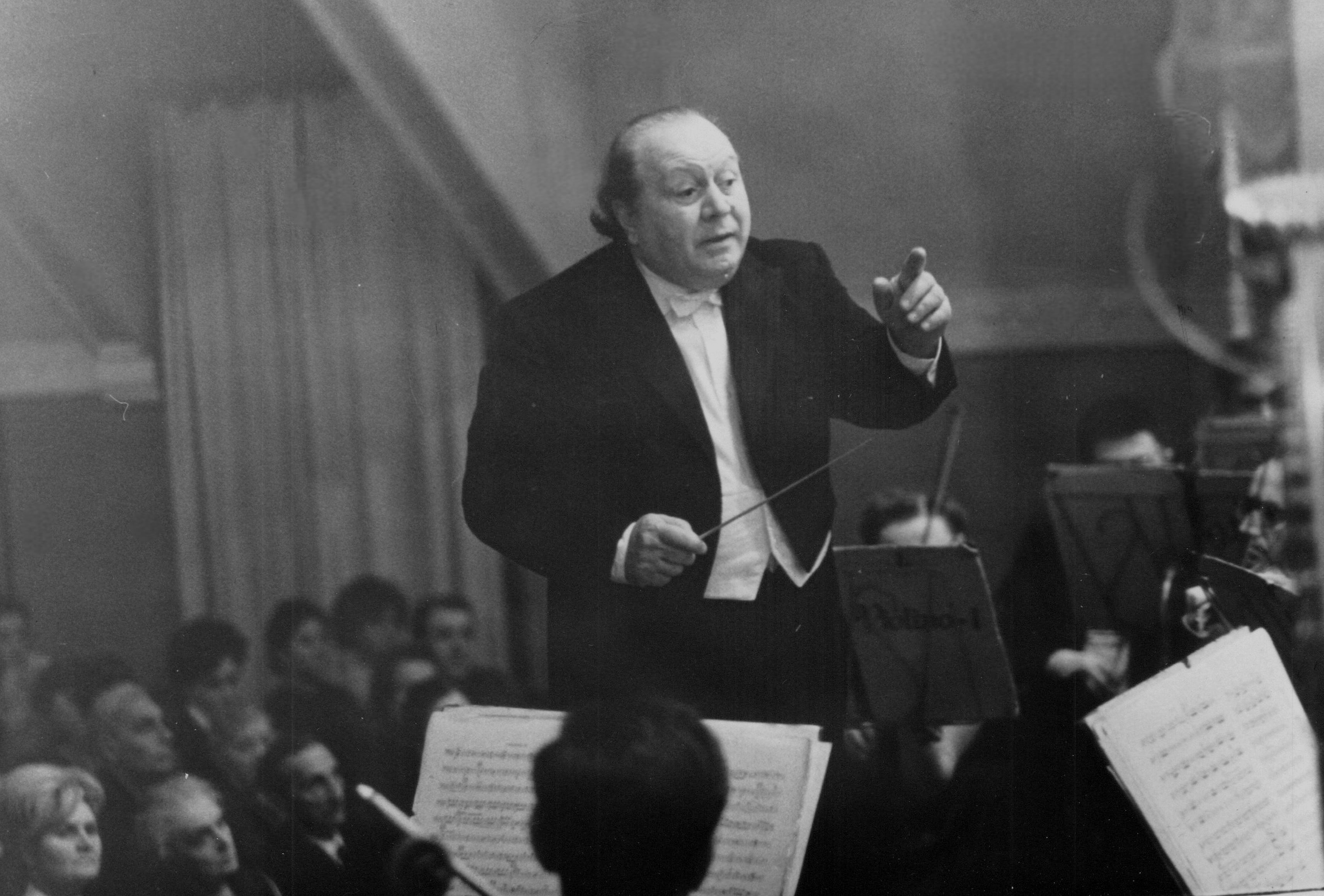
Natan Hryhorovych Rakhlin

Natan Hryhorovych Rakhlin (Note: Ukrainian: Натан Григорович Рахлін, romanized: Natan Hryhorovych Rakhlin; Russian: Натан Григорьевич Рахлин, romanized: Natan Grigoryevich Rakhlin) (10 January 1906 [O.S. 28 December 1905] – 28 June 1979) was a Soviet and Ukrainian Jewish conductor.

== Biography ==
Rakhlin was born January 10, 1906, in Snovsk, Gorodnyansky Uyezd, Chernigov Governorate, Russian Empire.

He served as Artistic Director of the Ukrainian SSR State Symphony Orchestra from 1937 to 1962 and was the musical director of a number of Soviet films. In 1941 he succeeded Alexander Gauk as director of the USSR State Symphony Orchestra. On October 30, 1957, Rakhlin conducted the premiere of Dmitri Shostakovich's Symphony No. 11.

He was the founder of the Tatar ASSR State Symphony Orchestra, which he led from its foundation in 1966 until his death in 1979.

== Discography ==
- N. Rimsky-Korsakov, P. Tchaikovsky, V. Kalinnikov - Russian Conductors Vol. 12 - Nathan Rakhlin by Pyotr Ilyich Tchaikovsky, Vasily Kalinnikov, Nikolai Rimsky-Korsakov, Nathan Rakhlin, and Moscow Philharmonic Symphony Orchestra Bolshoi Theatre Orchestra (audio CD - 2008)
- Glazunov: Symphony No. 4 (conducted by Natan Rakhlin), Cortège Solonel, Poeme Lyrique (conducted by Gennady Rozhdestvensky), Moscow Radio Symphony Orchestra. His Master's Voice-Melodiya ASD 3238 (LP no longer available).
- R. Glière: Symphony No. 3 in B Minor, Op. 42 "Ilya Murometz", The Large Symphony Orchestra, Moscow Radio and Television, Melodiya 33 С 10—05255-8 (1974)
