= Serge Provost =

Canadian composer

Serge Provost (born August 29, 1952) is a Canadian composer and organist.

== Career ==
Provost was born in Saint-Timothée de Beauharnois, Quebec. He studied at the Conservatoire de musique du Québec à Montréal (CMQM), where he won first prize for composition in 1979 and musical analysis in 1978. He also studied the organ with Bernard Lagacé. He went on to study in France at the Conservatoire National Supérieur de Musique de Paris, where he won first prize in analysis in 1981.

He is a professor of composition and analysis at the CMQM where some of his notable pupils have included composers Patrick Saint-Denis and Nicolas Gilbert. One of his notable works is Le Vampire et la Nymphomane, "an opera for which he received the 1996 Prix Opus". His second string quartet, Ventis Arboris Vocis, garnered praise from the international press. He "has also written many articles, particularly for the revue Circuit and the Encyclopédie de la Musique Einaudi".
