= Grace Vamos =

American cellist, composer and educator

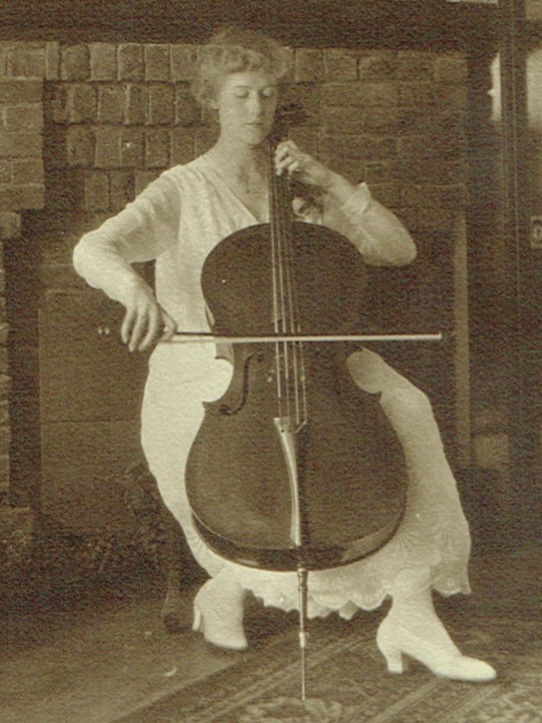
- Grace Becker Vamos at 19 years old (courtesy Vamos estate)
- Born: Grace Becker Vamos; April 17, 1898; San Francisco, California
- Died: March 25, 1992
- Occupation(s): Composer, educator
- Spouse: Ernest Vamos

Grace Becker Vamos (April 17, 1898 – March 25, 1992) was an American cellist, composer, and educator.

== Early life and education ==
Vamos grew up in Berkeley, California. Her mother played piano, her father played violin, and they hosted frequent chamber music sessions during her childhood. The family had an unused cello, which she learned how to play.

Vamos studied pedagogy at the Paris Conservatory with Andre Hekking, then received a Damrosch scholarship to remain in France and study at the Fontainebleau School of Music. She returned to California and taught cello and composition at Mills College, where she also studied composition with Domenico Brescia. In 1937, Vamos traveled to Hungary to study composition with Zoltan Kodaly. She left Hungary in 1939, as World War II began.

== Career ==
Vamos joined a string quartet in Mexico City, where her dance composition Dying Eagle was performed in the Opera House. Her choral composition Praise Ye the Lord was performed by the Bach Choral Society of Mexico City. Vamos returned to San Francisco where the Oakland Symphony performed her piano concerto in the premiere performance of a piano concerto by a female composer in the state of California.

She formed the Trio Moderne with flutist Christine Howells Pfund and harpist Marie Hughes Marguarrie, which performed frequently, often playing arrangements by Vamos.

Vamos received the Sigma Alpha Iota Award for her Suite for Cello and Piano, which Pablo Casals praised in a letter to her in 1960, saying "I have had much pleasure in reading your composition which shows real talent." She received the Harp Association Award for Legends of the Redwood.

Vamos endowed several scholarships and awards: the Grace Becker Vamos Scholarship for promising young cellists in 1975; the Grace Vamos Scholarship Trust and the Ernest Vamos Memorial Scholarship at Holy Names College (now Holy Names University) in 1981; and the Grace Vamos National Cello Competition in 1990. She later endowed the Contra Costa String Association annual competition, stipulating that at least one of her works be performed each year. The String Association later added a Grace Vamos Division to the competition.

== Personal life ==
In 1948, Vamos married Ernest Vamos, a Hungarian immigrant to the United States. He was an amateur cellist and a dentist.After her husband's death, Vamos moved to an assisted living facility near Danville, California. She continued to give private lessons and arrange student recitals at the assisted living residence until her death in 1992.

== Legacy ==
Vamos' cello music is archived at Holy Names University. Her music was published by Harp Publications, Lyra Music Company, and Vamos Publications. Upon her death, ownership of all copyrighted works was transferred to Ariel Witbeck, a dear friend and local cellist to the San Francisco Bay area. These works were later gifted to Vamos Publications, which incorporated in the State of Washington in 2022.

== Compositions ==
=== Cello(s) ===
- 18th Century Classics (for two cellos)
- Adios
- Baroque Trios (for three cellos)
- Cello Concerto in D minor
- Cello Concerto in E minor
- Duos (for two cellos)
- Five Pieces: A Collection of First Position Pieces (etudes)
- Hebrew Melody (for three, six, or multiple cellos)
- Introduction to Thumb Position (etudes)
- Italian Suite (duo)
- Norwegian Melody (for three, six, or multiple cellos)
- Psalm (quartet)
- Retrospection (cello and piano)
- Suite for Cello and Piano

=== Violin ===
- Frolic
- Poem
- Serenity

=== Harp ===
- Fontainebleau Suite
- Inspiration (duo)
- Gypsy)
- Legend of the Redwoods

=== Flute ===
- In the Night
- Misty Night

=== Orchestra ===
- Dying Eagle (dance)
- Fantasy Concerto (piano and orchestra)

=== Piano ===
- A Memory
- Impressions
- Mystic Isle
- Nonsense
- Rhapsody

=== Vocal ===
- Praise Ye the Lord (choir)
- Three Songs
