= Patrick Saint-Denis =

Canadian composer based in Montreal (born 1975)

Patrick Saint-Denis (born 1975) is a Canadian composer based in Montreal. His works have been performed at music festivals in North America, Europe, and Asia. His composition, Les dits de Victoire, was awarded first prize in the SOCAN young composers competition in 2003 and the Jules Léger Prize for New Chamber Music in 2004. He also won the SOCAN competition in 2002 for his orchestral work, Le discours aux animaux and received honors for his Berceuse pour enfants perdus for chamber orchestra and female voice in 2003.

Born in Quebec City, Saint-Denis is a graduate of the Conservatoire de musique du Québec à Montréal, the Conservatoire de musique du Québec à Québec, and the Royal Conservatory of The Hague. Among his principal teachers are Louis Andriessen, Clarence Barlow, and Serge Provost. His works combine music, live audio-visual processing and robotics.
