= Charles Houdret =

Canadian conductor, cellist, radio producer and composer (1905 - 1965)

Charles Houdret (6 July 1905 – 1965) was a Canadian conductor, cellist, radio producer, and composer. He began his career in Belgium and was highly active as a conductor throughout Europe during the 1940s. In 1952 he immigrated to Canada where he ultimately became a naturalized citizen. He was active as a radio producer, cellist, and conductor in Canada up through 1964, after which nothing is known about his whereabouts or activities.

== Early life and career in Europe ==
Born in Liège, Belgium, Charles Houdret was trained at the Royal Conservatory of Liège where he was a pupil of Sylvain Dupuis in music composition. He also studied in Paris with André Hekking (cello), in Vienna with Felix Weingartner (conducting), and in Brussels with Eugène Ysaÿe (chamber music). Through Ysaÿe he was introduced to Albert I of Belgium and Elisabeth of Bavaria. Impressed with Houdret, the two monarchs appointed him to the post of director of the royal chapel orchestra. With this ensemble, he notably conducted Franz Schubert Symphony No. 5 in B flat major in a 1942 recording on the His Master's Voice music label. He spent the 1940s conducting this orchestra and others in concerts throughout Europe. During the Second World War he was jailed for embezzlement as he sold pianos and other orchestral material which did not belong to him.

== Life and career in Canada ==
In 1952 Houdret immigrated to Canada, initially to work as a conductor at the Montreal Festivals (MF). He made his first conducting appearance in Canada at the MF leading a performance of René Fauchois's play Beethoven which contained incidental music. Shortly thereafter he was appointed music director of CKVL-FM in Montreal and was appointed by Wilfrid Pelletier to the faculty of the Conservatoire de musique du Québec à Montréal (CMQM). He notably conducted the CMQM's orchestra in performances of Handel's Concerto Grosso No. 10 and a string orchestra arrangement of Corelli's Trio Sonatawith the CMQM's orchestra for a 1955 recording made for Radio Canada International. He eventually was appointed director of the group from 1960 to 1964, during which time he led the orchestra in the world premiere of André Prévost's Poème de l'infini.

Houdret was highly active as a guest conductor in Canada during the 1950s and early 1960s. He notably led five performances of Richard Wagner's Parsifal at the Palais du Commerce in April 1954, a work which had not been mounted in Canada since its national premiere in 1905. He appeared as a guest conductor with the CBC Symphony Orchestra 10 times between 1954 and 1964, notably conducting the group in the world premieres of Claude Champagne's Altitude and Robert Turner's Opening Night in 1960. For CBC Radio, he conducted the world premiere of Humphrey Searle's The Diary of a Madman in 1959. Houdret also appeared as a cellist in recitals and concerts throughout his career, although he primarily focused on his work as a conductor. He notably recorded six of Luigi Boccherini's cello sonatas with pianist Monique Marcil in 1963. In August of that same year he had an instrumental role in establishing the first Montreal International Music Competition. After 1964 nothing of his life is known.
