= Rage, Tyrants =

"Шалійте"

Song
- Language: Ukrainian
- English title: Rage, Tyrants
- Written: 1889
- Published: 1889
- Genre: revolutionary song
- Songwriter: Oleksander Kolessa
- Composer: Anatole Vakhnianyn

External videos
- A performance of the song by Taras Kompanichenko and Chorea Kozacka
- YouTube

"Rage, Tyrants" (Ukrainian: «Шалійте», romanized: Shaliite) is a Ukrainian socialist revolutionary song, written by Oleksander Kolessa in 1889 during student protests in Lviv (then part of Austria-Hungary). It is sung to the melody of "Chorus of the Normans" from Anatole Vakhnianyn's opera Yaropolk.

It was translated to Polish by Kazimierz Pietkiewicz in 1895 as "Pieśń wolnego ducha" and in 1898 from Polish to Russian by Gleb Krzhizhanovsky (who was imprisoned in the Butyrka prison together with Pietkiewicz) as "Беснуйтесь, тираны". It became a popular song among Ukrainian, Polish and Russian socialists and communists during the early 20th century (especially during the 1905 Revolution), and was also translated into other languages, such as German ("Wütet nur Henker") and Esperanto ("Koleru, tiranoj").

During the Soviet Union era, some Ukrainians opposing the Soviet government also sang the song, interpreting the "tyrants" as Russian communists.

"Rage, Tyrants" is quoted in the Symphony No. 11 in G minor by Dmitri Shostakovich, alongside the Polish song "Warszawianka".

== Lyrics ==
=== Ukrainian version ===
1889 version

Шалійте, Шалійте, скажені кати!
Годуйте шпіонів, будуйте тюрми!
До бою сто тисяч робітників стане,
Пірвем, пірвем, пірвем ті кайдани!

За правду, за волю ми станемо враз,
Ланци, ні баґнет не пострах для нас!
Бо вольного духа не скути в кайдани.
Біда, біда, біда вам, тирани!

Робітникам духа! Робітникам всім
Ми руки подаймо, на бій їх ведім!
Бо спільна усїх нас влучила недоля:
і труд і піт і кров, — кнут неволя!

За правду, за волю...

Від краю до краю не громи гудуть,
Робітників полки злучені ідуть
і поклик рокоче: Вставайте народи!
Прийшла пора, пора, — день свободи!

За правду, за волю...

Підвалини сьвіта валять ся старі,
Поблідли нероби, дрожать опирі,
Бо зоря свободи вже сходить яскрава!
Для всіх, для всіх, для всіх рівні права!

За правду, за волю...

І вольні народи, як добрі брати,
Полинуть до соньця, до щасьтя мети,
Розкувсь, двигнеть ся і наша родина:
Одна, сильна, вільна Україна!

Variant lyrics

Шалійте, шалійте, скажені кати,
Годуйте шпіонів, будуйте тюрми,
До бою сто тисяч робітників встане,
Порвем, порвем, порвем ці кайдани.

За волю народу, за його права
Не страшні кайдани, солодка тюрма,
Бо вільного духу не скути в кайдани,
На смерть, на смерть вам, тирани!

Робітники руху, робітникам всім
Ми руку подаймо, до бою їх звім.
Бо всіх нас з'єднала однакова доля:
І труд, і кнут, і піт, і неволя.

За волю народу, за його права...

Від краю до краю не громи гудуть, –
Робітників полки злучені ідуть,
І поклик рокоче: вставайте, народи!
Прийшла пора, прийшов день свободи.

За волю народу, за його права...

Підвалини світу валяться старі,
Поблідли нероби, дрижать упирі.
Свободи зоря уже сходить яскрава, –
Для всіх, для всіх, для всіх рівні права.

За волю народу, за його права...

Хай поклик наш грізно як грім загримить,
Дніпро, Дунай, Віслу нехай облетить!
Як сонечко ж волі з-за хмари погляне, –
На смерть! На смерть! На смерть вам, тирани!

=== Translations ===
Pieśń wolnego ducha (Polish)

Szalejcie, tyrani, niech pastwi się kat,
Szykujcie okowy, spętajcie w nie świat!
My wolni na duchu, choć skuci, związani —
Na wstyd, na wstyd, na wstyd wam tyrani.

Choć słabi na duchu przed wami gną kark
I niosą nikczemni sumienie na targ,
Lecz ducha wolnego nie straszą kajdany,
Na wstyd, na wstyd, na wstyd wam tyrani!

Na ciężką niedolę skazany i trud,
Bogactwa niezmierne gromadzi wam lud,
Zaś żeby nie przejrzał, są turmy, kajdany,
Bo strach, bo strach, bo strach wam tyrani.

Brutalna przewaga, łez chciwa i krwi,
Nad słabym bezkarnie się znęca i drwi,
Lecz ducha wolnego nie skują kajdany,
Na strach, na strach, na strach wam tyrani!

I chociaż potężny niewoli jest gmach,
Niepokój wasz rośnie i wzmaga się strach,
Bo władzy nie macie skuć ducha w kajdany,
I wstyd, i gniew, i strach wam tyrani!

Krwią naszą gaszony, rozpala się świt,
Wstrząsanych łańcuchów rozlega się zgrzyt —
I runą więzienia i prysną kajdany —
Na śmierć, na śmierć, na śmierć wam tyrani!

Беснуйтесь, тираны (Russian)

Беснуйтесь, тираны, глумитесь над нами,
Грозите свирепо тюрьмой, кандалами!
Мы сильные духом, хоть телом попраны –
Позор, позор, позор вам, тираны!

Пусть слабые духом трепещут пред вами,
Торгуют бесстыдно святыми правами;
Телесной неволи не страшны нам раны,
Позор, позор, позор вам, тираны!

За тяжким трудом в доле вечного рабства
Народ угнетенный вам копит богатства,
Но рабство и муки не сломят титана!
На страх, на страх, на страх вам, тираны!

В рудниках под землей, за станком и на поле,
Везде раздаются уж песни о воле,
И звуки той песни доходят до тронов,
На страх, на страх, на страх всем тиранам!

Сверкайте штыками, грозите войсками,
Спасти вас не могут казармы с тюрьмами,
Ваш собственный страх не сковать вам цепями,
И стыд, и страх, и месть вам, тираны!

От пролитой крови земля заалела,
Могучая всюду борьба закипела,
Пожаром восстанья объяты все страны,
И смерть, и смерть, и смерть вам, тираны!

Wütet nur Henker (German)

Ja, wütet nur Henker und tobet wie toll
Nährt Spitzel und steckt die gefängnisse voll!
Wir wollen uns im Kampfe die Freiheit erwetten.
Zerreißt, Zerreißt, Zerreißt eure Ketten!

Den Weg zur Befreiung nimmt unser Lauf;
Wir nehmen dafür selbst den Kerker in Kauf.
Ihr werdet die Geister der Freiheit nicht bannen;
Drum Tod, drum Tod, drum Tod den Tyrannen.

Doch endlich wird kommen der große Tag;
Vernichtet wird alles mit mächtigem Schlag.
Da werden sie lernen im Blute baden,
Zum Kampf, zum Kampf, zum Kampf Kameraden!

Legt nieder die Arbeit, setzt Euch zur Wehr!
Tod den Unterdrücken dem schurkischen Heer
Lasst zwischen die Schurken die Bomben fliegen!
Zerstört, verbrennt, zersprengt, ihr müsst siegen!

English translation

Rage, go crazy you rabid executioners!
Feed spies, Build prisons!
To battle a hundred thousand workers will rise,
We'll break we'll break we'll break these shackles!

For truth, for freedom we will rise up,
Lances nor batons won't scare us!
A free soul can't be shackled.
Damm damm damm you, tyrants!

To workers of the soul to all workers!
We're shaking hands and leading battle!
Because all of us share this misfortune:
this hardship this sweat and blood—this oppresion!

For truth, for freedom...

From country to country that sound isn't thunder,
Worker's battalions march united
With battalions hand in hand: People rise up!
The time has come, the time — the day of freedom!

For truth, for freedom...

The old foundations of the world are crumbling,
The idle grow pale, the vampires tremble,
Because the bright star of freedom is rising!
For all, for all, for all equal rights!

За правду, за волю...

Free nations, like close brothers,
will fly to the sun, to a fortunate goal,
Allover our family is moving:
One strong free Ukraine!
