= Symphony No. 11 (Shostakovich) =

1957 symphony by Dmitri Shostakovich

- The Year 1905
- by Dmitri Shostakovich
- The first page of the symphony's score
- Key: G minor
- Opus: 103
- Composed: 1957
- Duration: 1 hour
- Movements: 4
- Scoring: Orchestra

Premiere
- Date: 30 October 1957
- Location: Moscow
- Conductor: Natan Rakhlin
- Performers: USSR Symphony Orchestra

The Symphony No. 11 in G minor, Op. 103 (subtitled The Year 1905), by Dmitri Shostakovich was written in 1957 and premiered by the USSR Symphony Orchestra under Natan Rakhlin on 30 October 1957. The symphony's subtitle refers to the events of the Russian Revolution of 1905, which the symphony depicts. The first performance given outside the Soviet Union took place in London's Royal Festival Hall on 22 January 1958, when Malcolm Sargent conducted the BBC Symphony Orchestra. The United States premiere was given by Leopold Stokowski and the Houston Symphony on 7 April 1958.

The symphony was conceived as a popular piece and proved an instant success in the Soviet Union, his greatest since the Leningrad Symphony 15 years earlier. It earned him a Lenin Prize in April 1958.

== Instrumentation ==
The symphony is scored for 3 flutes (3rd doubling piccolo), 3 oboes (3rd doubling cor anglais), 3 clarinets (3rd doubling bass clarinet), 3 bassoons (3rd doubling contrabassoon), 4 horns, 3 trumpets, 3 trombones, tuba, timpani, triangle, snare drum, cymbals, bass drum, tam-tam, xylophone, tubular bells, 2 harps (preferably doubled), celesta and strings.

It has become common professional performance practice for the tubular bells part (only used at the conclusion of the fourth movement) to be played on four large church bells tuned to the notes required (G, C, B♭ and B♮).

== Structure ==
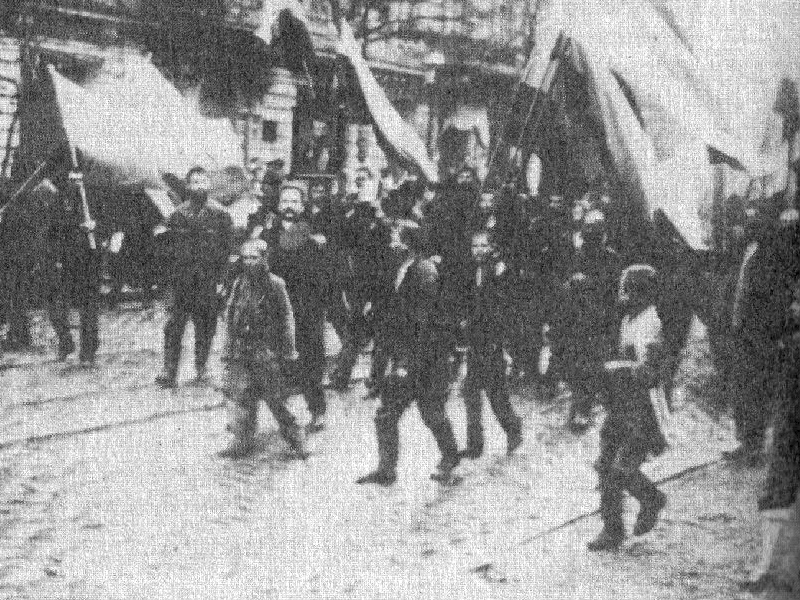
Demonstrators march to the Winter Palace

The symphony has four movements played without break, and lasts approximately one hour.

1. Adagio (The Palace Square)
2. Allegro (The 9th of January)
3. Adagio (Memory Eternal)
4. Allegro non troppo (The Tocsin)

The first movement reflects the discomforting quietness of Palace Square on the morning of Bloody Sunday. The Adagio incorporates two Russian folk songs, Slushai ("Hearken"), and Arrestant ("The Prisoner"), played by flute and bass respectively, that are associated with famed political figures. Throughout the movement, timpani motifs allude to events to come.

The second movement depicts the events of Bloody Sunday at the Winter Palace on 22 January 1905 [O.S. 9 January]. It is based on two themes from Shostakovich's Ten Choral Poems on Revolutionary Texts, Goy ty, tsar nash, batyushka ("O thou, our Tsar, our father") and Obnazhite golovy ("Bare your heads"). The first section depicts the petitioners at the protest. Crowds descended on the Winter Palace to complain about the government's inefficiency, corruption, and harsh ways. This section is busy and constantly moves forward. It builds to two steep climaxes, then recedes into a deep, frozen calm in the prolonged piccolo and flute melodies, underscored again with distant brass.

Another full orchestra buildup launches into a pounding march, in a burst from the snare drum like gunfire and fugal strings, as the troops descend on the crowd. This breaks out into a section of relentless strings, and trombone and tuba glissandos produce a nauseating sound underneath the troops' advance on the crowd. Then comes a section with prominent snare drum, bass drum, timpani, and tam-tam solo before a climax gives way to pianissimo trills on the strings.

The third movement is a lament based on the revolutionary funeral march Vy zhertvoyu pali ("You fell as victims"). Toward the end, there is one more outbreak, where material from the second movement returns.

The final movement serves as a warning and a stance of defiance. The celesta is a tocsin (a signal of alarm, in Russian nabat, also the name of a revolutionary magazine) to anticipate the events of 1917. Three pieces are quoted: Besnuytes, tyranny ("Rage, tyrants"), Varshavyanka ("Whirlwind of danger"), and Ogonki ("Sparks").

The musicologist David Fanning described the Eleventh Symphony as a "a film score without the film". An additional thread is provided by the nine revolutionary songs that appear in the work. Some of these date to the 19th century, others to 1905. This use of folk and revolutionary songs was a departure from Shostakovich's usual style. They were songs he knew well. His family knew and sang them regularly while he was growing up. In his study of Shostakovich's symphonies, Hugh Ottaway praised the Eleventh as one of the great achievements in program music.

== Overview ==
=== Composition ===
Shostakovich originally intended the Eleventh Symphony to mark the 50th anniversary of the Russian Revolution of 1905 and would have written it in 1955. Several personal factors kept him from composing the work until 1957, including his mother's death, his tumultuous second marriage, and the arrival of many newly freed friends from the Gulag. Events in Hungary in 1956 may have stirred Shostakovich out of his compositional inertia and acted as a catalyst for his writing the symphony.

=== Requiem for a generation ===
According to the composer's son-in-law Yevgeny Chukovsky, the original title sheet for this symphony read not "1905" but "1906", the year of the composer's birth. This causes critics to view the Eleventh Symphony as a requiem not only for the composer himself but for his generation. Still, because the work was composed for the Revolution, its purpose is not lost. The 1905 Revolution was not politicized by the Party, so the piece maintained its romantic aura for later generations. Because of this, the Eleventh Symphony is among a group of diverse works that embody a spirit of struggle for a just cause, such as Sergei Eisenstein's film Battleship Potemkin and Boris Pasternak's narrative poems "1905" and "Lieutenant Schmidt".

"The Year 1905" recalls the start of the first Russian Revolution of 1905, which was partially fired by the events on 9 January (9 January by the Julian calendar still in use in Russia at the time, modern date of 22 January 1905) of that year. Some Western critics characterized the symphony as overblown "film music"—in other words, as an agitprop broadsheet lacking substance or depth.

=== Most Mussorgskian symphony ===
Shostakovich considered this work his most "Mussorgskian" symphony. He wrote the Eleventh in a simple, direct manner. According to Solomon Volkov, Shostakovich told him that the symphony was "about the people, who have stopped believing because the cup of evil has run over".

=== Testimony and the Hungarian Revolution ===
In the wake of the publication of Volkov's Testimony, the Eleventh has attracted speculation over its possible references to the Hungarian Revolution of 1956. According to Volkov, Shostakovich said the piece "deals with contemporary themes even though it's called '1905'". According to Zoya Tomashevskaya, Shostakovich also told Igor Belsky not to forget that he "wrote the symphony in the aftermath of [the] Hungarian Uprising". Shostakovich's widow Irina also said he had the Hungarian Revolution "in mind" during composition. Extant evidence and the chronology of the symphony's composition suggests that this could not have been the case. When Sofia Khentova asked Shostakovich in 1974 whether the Eleventh was a veiled reference to the Hungarian Revolution, he replied: "No, it is 1905, it is Russian history."
