= Louis Dufort =

Canadian composer

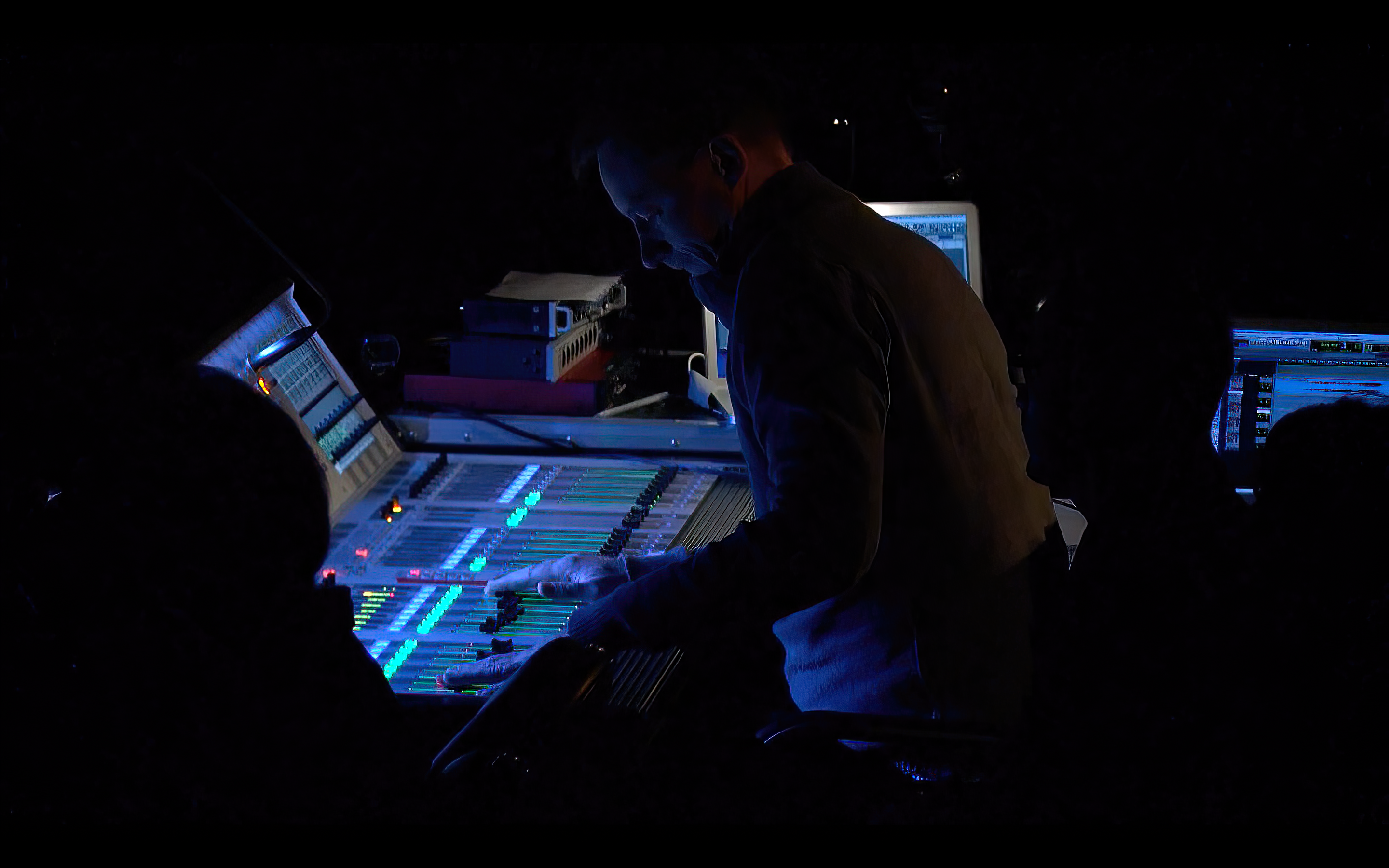
- Concert Akousma @ Empac. November 1, 2014. Louis Dufort presented his piece Étude no. 2 (2014) : https://vimeopro.com/empac/empac-video-archive/video/152627299

Background information
- Born: July 29, 1970 (age 55); Montreal, Canada
- Genres: Electroacoustic music
- Occupation(s): Composer, educated at Conservatoire de musique du Québec à Montréal and Université de Montréal
- Labels: Empreintes DIGITALes
- Website: louisdufort.com

Louis Dufort (born July 29, 1970) is a composer of electroacoustic music from Montreal, Canada. His work includes music for fixed media, mixed music with processing, and visual music.

Over his career, he has fulfilled numerous commissions for various ensembles and musical organizations, including the Association pour la création et la recherche électroacoustiques du Québec (ACREQ), Société de musique contemporaine du Québec (SMCQ), Réseaux/Akousma, Chants libres, Codes d’accès, Ensemble contemporain de Montréal (ECM+), EMPAC, Quasar saxophone quartet, Bozzini string quartet, Sixtrum percussion ensemble and Centre d’art et de technologie des médias de Karlsruhe.

Particularly notable among his many collaborations is his long-standing partnership with choreographer Marie Chouinard, with whom he has worked since 1996 in composing the music for a great many of her works. In 2023, an entire edition of the journal Circuit, musiques contemporaines was dedicated to the subject of their collaborative work. The composer has also written music for the original soundtracks of the films The Fall of the American Empire (French: La chute de l’empire américain) (2018) and Denys Arcand’s Testament(2023).

Dufort is professor of composition at the Conservatoire de musique de Montréal and artistic director of the broadcasting company Akousma, which hosts the annual Festival international des musiques numériques immersives in Montreal. In 2018, he was awarded the Québec Opus prize for artistic director of the year.

== Early Works (1900-2000) ==
Dufort's gravitation towards electroacoustic music, including his marked interest in mixed music and multimedia, began in the initial stages of his compositional development.

Meanwhile, he developed an aesthetic that was largely focused on provoking emotional responses in the listener. This early aesthetic, which shaped his music over the first decade of his career, translated into an evocative musical language that conveys a sense of unrest through intense musical moments. Characteristic examples from this period include acousmatic works Pointe-aux-Trembles (1996), Transit (1998) and Zénith (1999), as well as mixed music Lucie (1998) and Consomption (1999). The emotive idiom explored in these compositions reaches its pinnacle in Décap (2000), a work for audio fixed media that evokes the horror and gravity of human conflict in the world.

== Shift to Organicism (2000-2010) ==
The works of the following decade lend themselves to a more abstract mode of expression, which for Dufort was inspired by the various complex systems found in nature. This marks the composer's shift to oganicism, which he debuted in his album of fixed media works Matériaux composés (2008, empreintes DIGITALes), especially Grain de sable (2004-2005) and the cycle Matério (2006-2007). As the composer has stated in reference to the latter work, "this cycle marks the beginning of an abstract organicist approach, which represents a change of direction compared to my previous works that were more built around dramatic affects [...] the Matério cycle is a first attempt to extract organizational and musical structures from the emergent and dynamic properties of sound material.”

== Recent Work (2010-) ==
Dufort's work has continued to be deeply influenced by nature, which tends to reflect in a broad sense—as in the surface-level portrayal of the Laurentides' forests in Monts Valin (2022)—in addition to the deliberate way the music is organized at a deeper and more intricate, even microscopic, level, according to nature's own inherent systems. In the composer's words, this design of “macroscopic views of micro-organisms and the natural, chaotic organization of elements” ultimately creates “music that becomes very active, nervous, mineral, almost chemical.”

The cycle Into the Forest (2021, Empreintes DIGITALes) is one large-scale example of a more recent nature-inspired work that conveys, as its title suggests, a submersion into the forest atmosphere. As the composer commented around the time of its premiere, this work was created around “the idea of a grand structure [...] that organizes life in the forest.” Further examples of his more recent nature-inspired works include visual music bjvfewo (2018) and the series of miniatures Argile (2022), Billot (2024), Femme Forêt (2024), Fleuve Rive (2023) and Planétarium (2024).

== Processing ==
Live processing is a frequent feature in Dufort's earlier mixed music compositions, as in Accident (2001), Spiel (2001), Déflagration (2002), Intonarumori (2002), and Manu militari (2003). The composer's venture deeper into organicism, however, eventually prompted him to abandon this feature in favor of preserving the natural timbres of acoustic instruments. Les corpuscules agglutinés (2013) marks the start of this shift, where the only adjustment made to the instruments’ natural sound production is high-fidelity amplification used to enhance the quality of the acoustic spectrum.

== Visual Music ==
Dufort's interest in creating visual music has been influenced by the philosophies of Henri Bergson as well as his collaborative experiences with Marie Chouinard. In works such as Épochè (2008), the composer explores direct interactions between sound and visuals, where digitally generated images respond to the movement of sound in real time. This intertwining of sound and image is designed to create a kinesthetic effect in the listener, stimulating the body over the mind. Further examples of such works include mixed audiovisual works like Yutiröp (2011) and Quatre histoires néguentropiques (2011) for string quartet, fixed media, 3d visual synthesis and dance.

== Influences ==
Dufort describes his own aesthetic as “maximalist,” further noting that it draws from the systems approach in its conception and treatment of individual sound objects as part of a complex whole. The possibilities offered by digital technology assist in the application of this approach, allowing the composer to analyze and work with sound in ultra-fine detail. Further influences he cites include the writings and music of Horacio Vaggione, as well as the teachings from his mentor, Francis Dhomont.

== Discography ==
- Francis Dhomont – Frankenstein Symphony (1997), Asphodel/Sombient (various artists)
- Prix International Noroit-Léonce Petitot 1997 (1998), Centre Noroit (various artists)
- eXcitations : Sampler (2000), empreintes DIGITALes, IMED 0050 (various artists)
- Connexion (2000), empreintes DIGITALes, IMDE 0051
- Électricités/Electricities (2003), Centre de musique canadienne/Canadian Music Centre (various artists)
- L’Orchestre de granulation (2003), empreintes DIGITALes, NT 086 (various artists)
- Montreal Sound Matter – Montréal Matière Sonore (2006), Pogus Productions, P21041-2 (various artists)
- Matériaux composés (2008), empreintes DIGITALes, IMDE 0893
- trans_canada (2009), empreintes DIGITALes, IMDE 09100 (various artists)
- Victoriaville matière sonore (2009), Les Disques Victo, VICTO 113 (various artists)
- A Tasty Swarm of Small Signals (2010), Störung, str008 (various artists)
- Into the Forest (2021), empreintes DIGITALes, IMDE 21175
- Tour Mode (2021), SUPERPANG (various artists)
- Volume (2021), SUPERPANG

== Selected works ==
1994

- Vulvatron 2000, for audio fixed media, 3:00

1995

- Concept 2018957, for audio fixed media, 15:00

1996

- Pointe-aux-Trembles, for stereo, 14:26. Final version created in 1998

1998

- Étude poignante. Stage music for choreography by Marie Chouinard (solo for Carol Prieur)
- Humanitas. Stage music for choreography by Marie Chouinard (solo for Carol Prieur)
- Lucie, for Farfisa organ, flute, processing and audio fixed media, 17:00
- Transit, for stereo, 12:00

1999

- Consomption, for soprano, processing and audio fixed media, 16:00
- Zénith, for stereo, 14:31

2000

- Décap, for stereo, 24:07
- Le cri du monde, 60:00. Stage music for choreography by Marie Chouinard for 9 performers
- Silo mon amour, for soprano, processing and visual support, 25:00. Live performance
- Symphonie du millénaire, for 333 musicians, 2000 carillonneurs, 15 bell towers, pipe organ, carillon of 56 bells, and 2 fire trucks, 90:00. Collaborative work with Serge Arcuri, Walter Boudreau, Vincent Collard, Yves Daoust, Alain Dauphinais, André Duchesne, Louis Dufort, Sean Ferguson, Michel Gonneville, André Hamel, Alain Lalonde, Estelle Lemire, Jean Lesage, Luc Marcel, Marie Pelletier, John Rea, Anthony Rozankovic, Gilles Tremblay. Arrangement by Denys Bouliane

2001

- Accident, for soprano saxophone and processing, 12:00
- Étude n^{o} 1, for interactive system, 22:00. Stage music for choreography by Marie Chouinard (solo for Lucie Mongrain)
- Spiel, for flute and processing, 16:00

2002

- Déflagration, for chamber orchestra and processing, 16:00
- Intonarumori, for harbor symphony (French: Symphonie portuaire), 20:00
- La femme des sables, 60:00. Stage music for choreography by Jocelyne Montpetit

2003

- Cantique n^{o} 1, for video, 15:00. Videomusic. Collaborative work with Marie Chouinard
- Cantique n^{o} 2, for video, 20:00. Videomusic. Collaborative work with Marie Chouinard
- Chorale, 40:00. Stage music for choreography by Marie Chouinard for 10 performers
- L’Orchestre de granulation, 32:00. Collaborative work with Cal Crawford, Érick d’Orion, Aimé Dontigny, Philémon Girouard, Julie Rousse and David Turgeon
- Les cerisiers, 50:00. Stage music for choreography by Jocelyne Montpetit
- Manu militari, for saxophone quartet and processing, 18:00
- Sound Object, for video, 10:00. Videomusic
- Trip à six, for 6 pianos, 12:00

2004

- Cantique n^{o} 3. Participatory installation video. Collaborative work with Marie Chouinard
- Dans le silence, for audio fixed media, 55:00. Stage music for dance work Dans le silence des bambous by Jocelyne Montpetit
- Ephem, for audio fixed media, 15:00

2004-2005

- Grain de sable, for 4.1-channel surround, 14:35

2005

- bODY_rEMIX/les_vARIATIONS_gOLDBERG, 110:00. Stage music for choreography by Marie Chouinard (ballet in two acts for 10 performers)
- Hi_Res, for 5.1-channel surround, 13:37
- Hyper Lucidity, for MIDI piano (Yamaha Disklavier) and processing, 15:00
- L’archange, for 3 voices, theater actor and audio fixed media, 52:31. Opera. Libretto by Alexis Nouss
- Mouvements, 64 dessins, un poème, une postface par Henri Michaux, Éditions Gallimard, 1951, 20:00. Stage music for choreography by Marie Chouinard (solo for Carol Prieur)

2006

- Flesh, for video, 5:00. Videomusic
- Matério_*, for 4.1-channel surround, 8:00
- Matério_**, for 4.1-channel surround, 9:00
- Miniatures, for string quartet and processing, 15:00
- Particules, for amplified piano, processing and video, 10:00

2006-2007

- Miniature II, for string quartet and processing, 15:00

2007

- Enfant d’obus, for 4.1-channel surround, 10:02
- Gen_3, for 4.1-channel surround, 8:56
- Matério_***, for 4.1-channel surround, 9:48
- Particules II, for video over 10 screens, 5:00. Videomusic
- Plastide, for 8 flutes and processing, 12:00

2008

- Épochè, for video, 10:00. Videomusic
- Orphée et Eurydice. Stage music for choreography by Marie Chouinard for 10 performers

2008-2012

- Julie Sits Waiting, for stereo, 67:00. Opera. Libretto by Tom Walmsley

2009

- gloires du matin :)-(:. Stage music for solo dance by Marie Chouinard
- Nervures, for stereo, 12:48
- Particules III, for piano, processing and video
- Pulsacion, for percussion, audio fixed media and video, 9:00

2010

- Le Nombre d’or (live). Stage music for choreography by Marie Chouinard for 10 performers
- Particules IV, for piano, processing and video, 5:49
- Rhizome, for flute, processing and video, 14:49

2011

- Henri Michaux : Mouvements. Stage music for choreography by Marie Chouinard for 10 performers
- La Nuit ensoleillée. Performance event. Stage music for choreography by Marie Chouinard for 18 performers
- Paradisi Gloria. Photographic installation. Collaborative work with Marie Chouinard
- Quatre histoires néguentropiques, for string quartet, audio fixed media, video and dance, 52:00
- Systemic Shock, for video, 5:00. Videomusic
- Yutiröp, for percussion and video, 14:49

2012

- Concatenare, for video. Videomusic
- Grain de lumière I, for audio fixed media, 2:59
- Grain de lumière II, for audio fixed media, 2:50
- In Museum. Participatory performance. Stage music for solo dance by Marie Chouinard

2013

- Corps célestes. Virtual immersive looped performance for dome. Collaborative work with Marie Chouinard

2013-2014

- Les corpuscules agglutinés, for spatialized musicians, electronic percussion and multi-channel surround

2014

- Study n^{o} 1, for audio fixed media, 7:00
- Study n^{o} 2, 7:00

2015

- Anne et Samuel. Stage music for choreography by Marie Chouinard (duo)
- Cantique. Application for iPad and iPhone. In collaboration with Marie Chouinard
- French Suite Remix, for audio fixed media
- Spirale n^{o} 1, for electric guitar, processing, audio fixed media and video, 12:00
- Soft virtuosity, still humid, on the edge. Stage music for choreography by Marie Chouinard for 10 performers

2016

- Concatenare IV, for video. Videomusic
- Inner Resources. Stage music for choreography by Marie Chouinard (ballet for 8 dancers)
- Jérôme Bosch : Le Jardin des délices. Stage music for choreography by Marie Chouinard for 10 performers
- Tombeau de Claudio Monteverdi, for audio fixed media, 14:56

2016-2017

- I Am, You Are, We Are Plastic, for flute, processing and video

2017

- Cy Twombly Somehow. Stage music for choreography by Marie Chouinard (ballet for 13 performers)

2017-2018

- bjvfewo, for video, 4:30. Videomusic

2018

- Duo Mains (Opéra Dogma, 2001-2018). Collaborative work with Marie Chouinard (duo for live-broadcast film)
- Radicale Vitalité. Stage music for choreography by Marie Chouinard for 10 performers (work composed of solos, duos, and group pieces, for 10 performers)
- Visages (Opéra Dogma, 2001-2018). Collaborative work with Marie Chouinard (solo for live-broadcast film)

2019

- En conversation. Stage music for choreography by Marie Chouinard (duo)

2020

- Jardin de sculptures éphémères. Live broadcast performance. Stage music for choreography by Marie Chouinard for 2 dancers
- Le Lac des cygnes : Le chant. Stage music for choreography by Marie Chouinard for 9 dancers
- Sur la lame, for tam-tam and audio fixed media, 7:00. Stage music for choreography by Marie Chouinard

2020-2021

- Into the Forest, for audio fixed media, 39:40. Cycle
- Volume, for multichannel surround, 19:45

2021

- Monts Valin, for multichannel surround, 11:36

2023

- « M », acousmatic, 58:00. Film score for choreography by Marie Chouinard for 12 performers

2024

- Argile (2022), 00:31; Billot (2024), 00:50; Femme Forêt (2024), 00:15; Fleuve Rive (2023), 04:03; Planétarium (2024), 0:29. Series of miniatures

== Collaborative Works with the Marie Chouinard company ==
- Étude poignante (1998), solo for Carol Prieur
- Humanitas (1998), solo for Carol Prieur
- Le Cri du monde (2000), for 9 performers
- Étude n^{o} 1 (2001), solo for Lucie Mongrain
- Chorale (2003), for 10 performers
- Cantique n^{o} 1 (2003), film
- Cantique n^{o} 2 (2003), multi-screen performance video
- Cantique n^{o} 3 (2004), participatory installation video
- bODY_rEMIX/les_vARIATIONS_gOLDBERG (2005), ballet in two acts for 10 performers
- Mouvements, 64 dessins, un poème, une postface par Henri Michaux, Éditions Gallimard, 1951 (2005), solo for Carol Prieur
- bODY_rEMIX/les_vARIATIONS_gOLDBERG (2008), film
- Orphée et Eurydice (2008), for 10 performers
- gloires du matin :)-(: (2009), solo dance by Marie Chouinard
- Le Nombre d’or (live) (2010), for 10 performers
- La Nuit ensoleillée (2011), performance event for 18 performers
- Henri Michaux : Mouvements (2011), for 10 performers
- Paradisi Gloria (2011), photographic installation
- In Museum (2012), solo dance by Marie Chouinard, participatory performance
- Corps célestes (2013), virtual immersive looped performance for dome
- Soft virtuosity, still humid, on the edge (2015), for 10 performers
- Cantique (2015), application for iPad and iPhone
- Anne et Samuel (2015), duo
- Inner Resources (2016), ballet for 8 dancers
- Jérôme Bosch : Le Jardin des délices (2016), for 10 performers
- Cy Twombly Somehow (2017), ballet for 13 performers
- Visages (Opéra Dogma, 2001-2018) (2018), solo for live-broadcast film
- Duo Mains (Opéra Dogma, 2001-2018) (2018), duo for live-broadcast film
- Radicale Vitalité (2018), work composed of solos, duos, and group pieces, for 10 performers
- En conversation (2019), duo
- Le Lac des cygnes : Le chant (2020), for 9 dancers
- Jardin de sculptures éphémères (2020), live broadcast performance for 2 dancers
- « M » (2023), for 12 performers
