= Oleksander Kolessa =

- Олександер Колесса
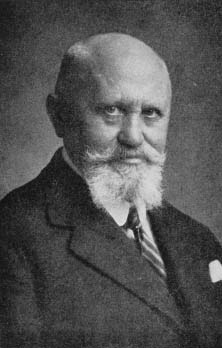
- Born: 24 April 1867; Khodovychi, Kingdom of Galicia and Lodomeria, Austria-Hungary
- Died: 23 May 1945 (aged 78); Prague, Czechoslovakia
- Education: University of Czernowitz
- Occupations: Ethnographer, linguist, literary historian, diplomat
- Children: Lubka Kolessa
- Relatives: Filaret Kolessa (brother); Mykola Kolessa (nephew)
- Writing career
- Language: Ukrainian
- Genres: Academic writing, poetry
- Subjects: History of Ukrainian language, history of Ukrainian literature, Ukrainian folklore
- Notable work: Rage, Tyrants

Oleksander Kolessa (Ukrainian: Олександер Колесса; 24 April 1867 – 23 May 1945) was a Ukrainian ethnographer, linguist, historian of literature and political activist. He was a brother of Filaret Kolessa and the father of Lubka Kolessa.

== Biography ==
Oleksander Kolessa was born in Khodovychi, Austrian Galicia(now Stryi Raion, Lviv Oblast). After studying at the University of Czernowitz, in 1895 he became a docent, and in 1898 professor of Lviv University. In 1899 he joined the Shevchenko Scientific Society. In 1907 Kolessa was elected to the Imperial Council, where he worked on the protection of Ukrainians' rights for education and became a co-founder of the All-Ukrainian Cultural Council in Vienna. On 29 October 1918 Kolessa arrived to Kyiv as a representative of Western Ukrainian political leadership in order to inform hetman Pavlo Skoropadsky on the creation of the Ukrainian National Council. In 1921 Kolessa served as a diplomatic representative of West Ukrainian People's Republic in Rome.

In late 1919, Kolessa began working on the creation of a Ukrainian university in Prague, and during the next year organized a series of public lectures in Vienna. As a co-founder of the Ukrainian Free University, he served as its rector in 1921–1922, 1925–1928, 1935–1937 and 1943–1944. Between 1923 and 1939 Kolessa also worked as a professor at Charles University. He died in May 1945 in Prague, soon after the entry of Soviet troops into the city. Kolessa's funeral was attended by over 300 people; many Ukrianians who came to his burial were arrested by the NKVD and deported to the Soviet Union.

== Scientific career ==
As a linguist, Kolessa belonged to the school of Franz Miklosich. After studying Old Ukrainian texts, in 1924 he published a work on the history of Ukrainian language. In the sphere of literary history, during the 1890s he studied Ukrainian folk songs in the poems of Wacław Zaleski, connections between Taras Shevchenko and Adam Mickiewicz, and presented an overview of works by Yuriy Fedkovych. In 1901 Kolessa published a general summary of Ukrainian literary studies. In 1898 he also authored an article dedicated to the centenary of new Ukrainian literature.

== Literary works ==
Oleksander Kolessa became known for his poem Rage, Tyrants (Ukrainian: Шалійте, шалійте, скажені кати), written in 1889 and set to the music of Anatole Vakhnianyn.
