= Joseph Masella (french hornist) =

Canadian french hornist and music educator

Joseph Masella (28 July 1925 - 2 October 1996) was a Canadian french hornist and music educator.

Masella was born in Montreal, Quebec. He is a member of the well-known Masella family of musicians. His father Frank Masella was principal clarinettist with a number of important Canadian orchestras, and his grandfather Raffaele Masella had played the clarinet with the Montreal Concert Band and the Victoria Rifles Band during the 19th century. All of his brothers were also professional musicians, and they all played together in the Montreal Symphony Orchestra: Raphael (clarinettist), Pietro (oboist), Rodolfo (bassoonist), Alfred (violinist), Paul (horn), Mario (violinist)and Giulio (Horn). Joseph notably premiered Michel Perrault's Serenade per tre fratelli on CBC TV with his brothers Paul and Giulio in 1964.

Masella studied the french horn with Harry Berv at the Conservatoire de musique du Québec à Montréal from 1943 to 1946. While a student, he was appointed principal horn of both the Montreal Symphony Orchestra and the CBC Montreal Orchestra, holding both posts from 1943 to 1969. He also played for the CBC 'Little Symphonies' Orchestra for many years and partnered with the Masella Wind Trio for performances and recordings.

Masella served on the music faculties of the Conservatoire de musique du Québec à Montréal (1946–1987), the Conservatoire de musique du Québec à Québec (1946–1964), and the Conservatoire de musique du Québec à Trois-Rivières (1965–1986). Two of his notable pupils included horn players Paul Marcotte and Marc Bouchard. He died in Montreal at the age of 71.
