= Karen Quinton =

Canadian musician

Karen Quinton is a Toronto-based Canadian pianist, organist, harpsichordist and music educator. She has performed as a soloist with many symphony orchestras in Canada, including the Toronto Symphony Orchestra and the Hamilton Philharmonic Orchestra. She has given recital tours throughout North America and Europe and has made numerous appearances on CBC Radio and CBC Television. Ms. Quinton was the head of the Keyboard Department at The Royal Conservatory of Music from 2000 to 2006 and is the organist at Centennial Japanese United Church in Toronto.

Quinton studied privately with Andreas Barban and earned the Trinity College Performers' Associate Diploma before entering the McGill University Faculty of Music, where she obtained a Bachelor of Music in piano performance and a post-graduate Concert Diploma. Concurrently she studied at the Conservatoire de musique du Québec à Montréal also with Lubka Kolessa, where she earned a Concours de Piano and a Concours de Dictée Musicale, both with highest distinction. After winning the Prix d'Europe in 1972, Karen Quinton pursued graduate piano studies with Tatiana Nikolayeva at the Moscow Conservatory from 1973 to 1975, and in London England with Katharina Wolpe, 1979- 81. She also spent one summer studying at the Salzburg Mozarteum. She was one of the founding faculty members of the School of Music at Memorial University.
