= Lubka Kolessa =

Canadian-Ukrainian pianist and educator

Lubka Oleksandrivna Kolessa (Ukrainian: Любов Олександрівна Колесса; 19 May 1902 in Lemberg, Austro-Hungarian Empire – 15 August 1997 in Toronto, Ontario, Canada) was a classical pianist and professor of piano.

== Biography ==
=== Education ===
The Kolessa family was a prominent Ukrainian intellectual family living in Lemburg, Austro-Hungarian Empire, which treated music very seriously. The family included a number of professional composers and performers. Her uncle Filaret Kolessa was a noted ethnomusicologist devoted to the research of Ukrainian folk music. Her cousin Mykola Kolessa was a prominent Ukrainian composer and conductor. Chrystia Kolessa, Lubka's sister, was an illustrious cellist.

Her first lessons came from her grandmother, a pianist who had studied with Karol Mikuli, a pupil of Chopin. Her father Oleksander Kolessa (1867–1945) had been elected as a deputy in the Austrian Reichsrat, the parliament of Cisleithania. In 1904 the family moved to Vienna.

In Vienna she studied at the Musikakademie Wien with Louis Thern and Emil von Sauer where she obtained her diploma in 1920, aged 16. She played as a soloist with the orchestras and conductors of Europe and was known as a pianist.

=== Concert tours ===
In 1928, she undertook a triumphal tour to her homeland, at this time now under the administration of Poland. Later in 1928 she recorded as the last classical pianist six pieces for Welte-Mignon (see media). From 1929 to 1930 she studied again with Eugen d'Albert, who had a strong influence on her performance style.

On 21 May 1937, Kolessa appeared on British television, playing a concert while wearing Ukrainian folk dress.

1938 she successfully toured South America. Until 1939 she performed in Europe, recording a number of records for Electrola in Germany.

Kolessa married the British diplomat James Edward Tracy Philipps in Prague on 13 March 1939, the eve of the occupation.

At the peak of her career as a concert pianist she moved 1940 to Ottawa, Ontario. She continued to perform numerous concerts including engagements with the New York Philharmonic.

She continued to tour throughout the Americas and was one of the most notable pianists in those continents. In 1954 she ended her concert activities to devote herself to teaching.

=== Educator ===
From 1942 she taught piano at the Royal Conservatory of Music in Toronto, from 1955 to 1966 at the École de musique Vincent-d'Indy in Montreal, for twelve years at the McGill University and 1959–1960 in New York City at the Ukrainian Music Institute as well as at the Conservatoire de musique du Québec à Montréal. Among her notable pupils were conductor and pianist Mario Bernardi, composers Clermont Pépin and John Hawkins and pianists Howard Brown Karen Quinton, Richard Gresko, Louis-Philippe Pelletier, Eugene Plawutsky, Pierrette Froment Savoie, Luba Zuk and Ireneus Zuk.

== Recordings ==
The Doremi label in 1999 released a set of three compact discs (DHR-7743-5) reissuing Kolessa's commercial recordings and some radio broadcasts, private recordings, and unissued recordings from 1936 to 1949. Works included range from two sonatas by Domenico Scarlatti to Beethoven's Third Piano Concerto and Brahms's Variations and Fugue on a Theme by Handel.

Recently Kolessa's old recordings have been issued. In Karl Böhm's "The Early Years Box" (Warner, 19CD), her rare commercial recording of Beethoven's Piano Concerto No.3, conducted by Karl Böhm/SKD(rec.1939), is included.

== Media ==
Lubka Kolessa plays for Welte-Mignon in 1928 Frédéric Chopin: Mazurka No. 23 in D major Op. 33, 2 *3627 kB
