= Frank Hekking =

Dutch physicist

Frank Willem Jan Hekking (28 September 1964 – 15 May 2017) was a Dutch physicist working at Université Grenoble Alpes in Grenoble, France. He is notable for his contributions in theory of mesoscopic superconductivity, in particular, Andreev reflection and Josephson effect. He was a member of Institut Universitaire de France since 2012 until his death.

In 1992, Hekking received a PhD degree from Delft University of Technology, where he worked under supervision of Gerd Schön. After postdoctoral appointments at the University of Karlsruhe, the University of Minnesota, the University of Cambridge, and Ruhr University Bochum, he became a professor at Université Grenoble Alpes. He was attached to Laboratoire de Physique et de Modélisation des Milieux Condensés of CNRS, and he was a director of this laboratory on two occasions.
