= Filaret Kolessa =

Ukrainian composer, ethnographer, and folklorist

- Філарет Михайлович Колесса
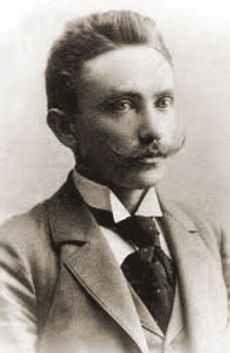
- Kolessa, photographed before 1912
- Born: Filaret Mykhailovych Kolessa; 17 July 1871; Tatarske, Galicia (now Pishchany, Ukraine)
- Died: 3 March 1947 (aged 75)
- Citizenship: Ukrainian
- Occupations: Ukrainian composer ethnographer, folklorist, musicologist, literary critic

Filaret Mykhailovych Kolessa (Ukrainian: Філарет Михайлович Колесса; 17 July 1871 – 3 March 1947) was a Ukrainian composer, ethnographer, folklorist, musicologist and literary critic. He was a member of the Shevchenko Scientific Society from 1909, All-Ukrainian Academy of Sciences from 1929, and the founder of Ukrainian ethnographic musicology.

== Biography ==
Filaret Mykhailovych Kolessa was born on 17 July 1871 in the Galician village of Tatarske, now the village of Pishchany, Lviv Oblast, Ukraine. He studied at the University of Vienna under the composer Anton Bruckner from 1891 to 1892, and completed his studies at the Lviv University in 1896.

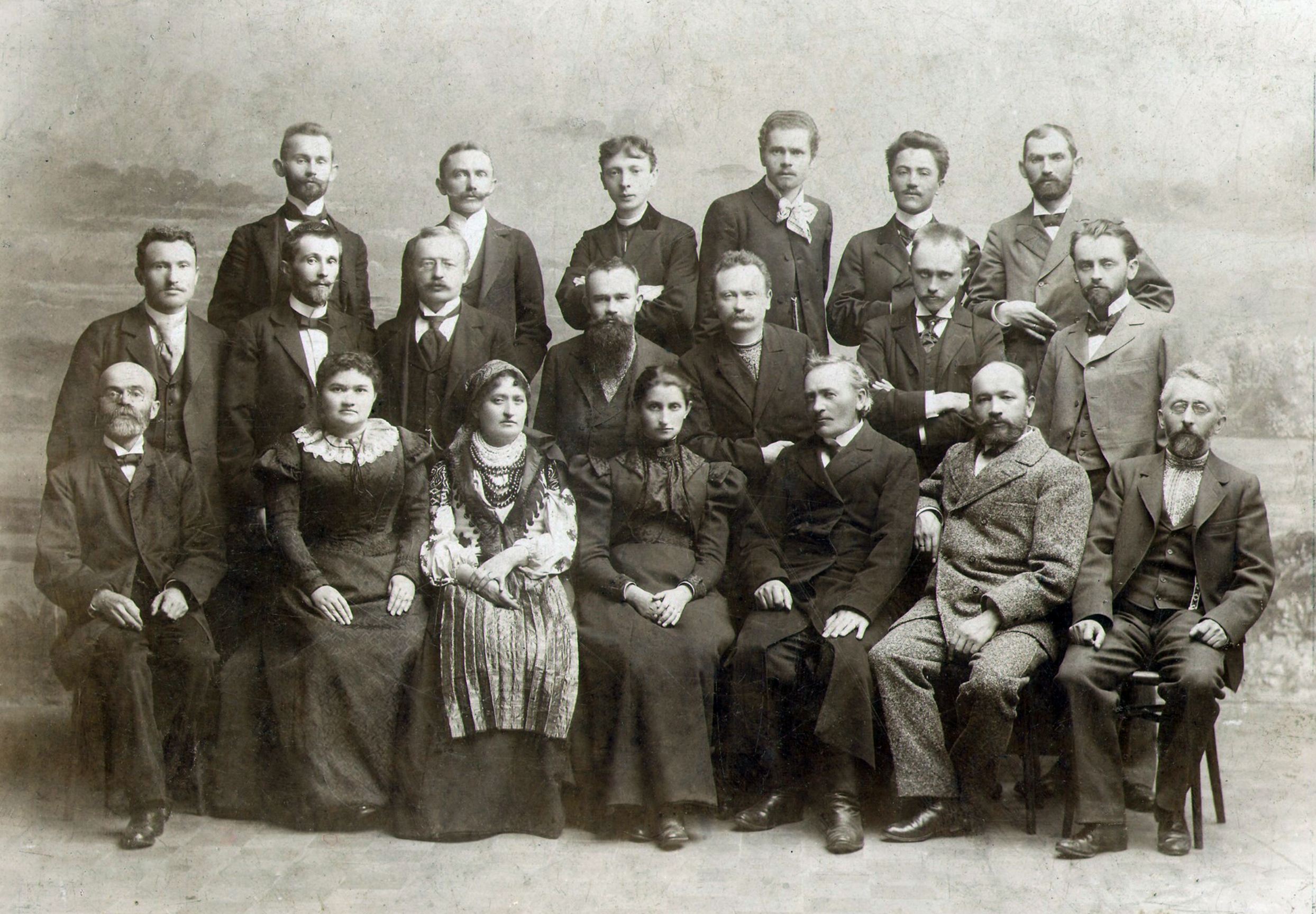
The board and members of the Shevchenko Scientific Society celebrating the 100th anniversary of the publication of Ivan Kotliarevsky's Eneida, Lviv, 31 October 1898: Sitting in the first row: Mykhaylo Pavlyk, Yevheniya Yaroshynska, Natalia Kobrynska, Olha Kobylianska, Sylvester Lepky, Andriy Chaykovsky, Kost Pankivsky. In the second row: Ivan Kopach, Volodymyr Hnatiuk, Osyp Makovej, Mykhailo Hrushevsky, Ivan Franko, Oleksandr Kolessa, Bohdan Lepky. Standing in the third row: Ivan Petrushevych, Filaret Kolessa, Yossyp Kyshakevych, Ivan Trush, Denys Lukianovych, Mykola Ivasyuk.

Filaret taught in high schools in Lviv, Stryi, and Sambir. He worked with the composer Mykola Lysenko, and the writers Ivan Franko and Lesya Ukrainka. In 1918, he defended his dissertation at the University of Vienna and received the title Doctor of Philology. He studied the rhythms of Ukrainian folk songs of Galicia, Volhynia and Lemkivshchyna. From 1939 he was a professor at Lviv University, from 1940 the director of the State museum of Ethnography in Lviv, director of the Lviv section, of the Institute for Art studies, Folklore and Ethnography of the Academy of Sciences of the Ukrainian SSR (from 1940), and a participant at international conferences of musicologists and philologists at Prague, Warsaw, Vienna, and Antwerp.

Kolessa died on 3 March 1947. He was buried in Lviv at Lychakiv Cemetery.

=== Family ===
Filaret had a brother, Oleksander Kolessa. He was also the father of Mykola Kolessa and the uncle of Lubka Kolessa.

== Main works ==
- Огляд українсько-руської народної поезії (1905), "A Survey of Ukrainian-Rus’ Folk Poetry"
- Ритміка українських народних пісень (1906–1907), "The Rhythms of Ukrainian Folk Songs"
- Мелодії українських народних дум (1910, 1913), "Melodies of Ukrainian Folk" dumy, 2 volumes
- Наверстування і характерні признаки українських народних мелодій (1913–1914), "Structure and Characteristics of Ukrainian Folk Melodies"
- Українські народні думи у відношенні до пісень, віршів і походження голосінь (1920–1921), "Ukrainian Folk Dumy and their Relationship to Songs, Poems and Funeral Laments"
- Про генезу українських народних дум (1921), "The Genesis of Ukrainian Folk Dumy".
- Народні пісні з південного Підкарпаття (1923), "Folk Songs of Southern Subcarpathia"
- Речитативні форми в українській народній поезії (1925), "Recitative Forms in Ukrainian Folk Poetry"
- Українські народні пісні на переломі 17–18 ст. (1928), "Ukrainian Folk Songs at the Turn of the 17–18th Centuries"
- Народні пісні з галицької Лемківщині (1929), "Folk Songs from the Galician Lemko Region"
- Українська усна словесність (1938),"The Ukrainian Oral Literature"
- Народні пісенні мелодії українського Закарпаття (1946). "Folk Song Melodies of the Ukrainian Carpathians"

Author of numerous choral works and arrangements of Ukrainian folk. Manuscript on the "History of Ukrainian ethnography" is still unpublished.

== See also ==
- Preservation of kobzar music

== Sources ==
- Katchanovski, Ivan; Kohut, Zenon E.; Nebesio, Bohdan Y.; Yurkevich, Myroslav (2013). Historical Dictionary of Ukraine (2nd ed.). Scarecrow Press. ISBN 978-08108-7-847-1.
- Wytwycky, Wasyl (2004). "Kolessa, Filaret". Internet Encyclopaedia of Ukraine. Canadian Institute of Ukrainian Studies.

=== Works ===
- Kolessa, Filaret (1905). Review of Ukrainian-Russian Folk Poetry (PDF) (in Ukrainian).
