= Conservatoire de musique du Québec à Montréal =

Music conservatory in Quebec, Canada

Coordinates: 45.5239°N 73.5865°W

- Abbreviation: CMQM
- Formation: 1943
- Type: Conservatory
- Legal status: active
- Purpose: Professional training in music
- Location: Montreal, Quebec, Canada
- Region served: Montreal, Quebec
- Official language: French
- Director: Manon Lafrance
- Parent organization: Conservatoire de musique et d'art dramatique du Québec
- Website: http://www.conservatoire.gouv.qc.ca

The Conservatoire de musique du Québec à Montréal (French pronunciation: [kɔ̃sɛʁvatwaʁ də myzik dy kebɛk a mɔ̃ʁeal], CMQM) is a music conservatory located in Montreal, Quebec, Canada. In addition to the Montreal region, the school takes in students from nearby cities, including Granby, Joliette, St-Jean, Saint-Jérôme, Sherbrooke, and Salaberry-de-Valleyfield. The school is the first of nine conservatories in Quebec which form the Conservatoire de musique et d'art dramatique du Québec (CMADQ). The current director is Manon Lafrance. In addition to practice rooms, classrooms and rehearsal halls, the conservatory contains 85 teaching studios, a 225-seat theater, a concert hall of 225 seats, a recital hall with 100 places, and a large music multimedia center with a recording studio. The conservatoire is also home to a substantial musical library.

== History ==
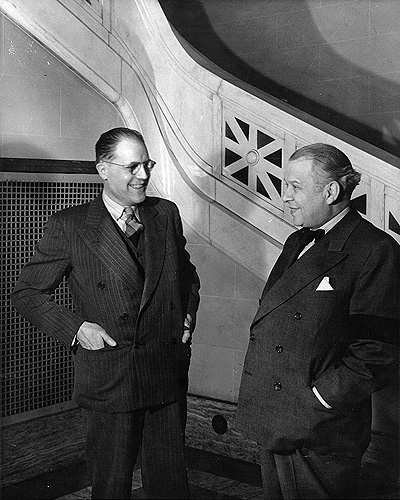
Claude Champagne (left) and Wilfrid Pelletier (right) at the opening of the Conservatoire de musique du Québec à Montréal in 1943.

In the 1940s a report examining music education in Europe and in Canada, compiled by Canadian composer Claude Champagne, was presented to the Quebec government by Champagne and Wilfrid Pelletier. The government decided to establish a network of state-subsidized schools modeled after European conservatories, particularly the Conservatoire de Paris. On 29 May 1942 The Conservatory Act ('Loi du conservatoire') was passed by the Legislative Assembly of Quebec which allocated a $30,000 budget to form the CMADQ's first school, the Conservatoire de musique du Québec à Montréal (CMQM).

The Conservatoire opened its doors in January 1943; at the time it was the first North American music institution of higher learning to be entirely state-subsidized. Orchestra conductor Wilfrid Pelletier served as the school's first director from 1943 through 1961; Champagne was the first assistant director. The school's first classes were held at the Saint-Sulpice Library at 1700 Saint Denis Street and in nearby buildings. The first full academic school year began the following October with 175 students enrolled. Pelletier and Champagne hired an international staff which included bassoonist Simon Kovar and Louis Letellier; cellists Jean Belland and Roland Leduc; clarinetist Joseph Moretti; double bass players Roger Charbonneau and Anselme Fortier; flautists Hervé Baillargeon, René Le Roy, Arthur Lora, and Marcel Moyse; harpist Marcel Grandjany; horn players Harry Berv and Bernard Baker; pianists Lubka Kolessa, Fleurette Beauchamp, Jean Dansereau, Auguste Descarries, Yvonne Hubert, Arthur Letondal, Germaine Malépart, Isidor Philipp, and Edmond Trudel; oboists Harold Gomberg, Bruno Labate, and Michel Nazzi; organists Joseph Bonnet and George M. Brewer; percussionist Saul Goodman; trombonist Charles Gusikoff; and violinists Noël Brunet, Albert Chamberland, Camille Couture, Maurice Onderet, and Ethel Stark.

Isabelle Delorme was the CMQM's first teacher of harmony and counterpoint. Léon Barzin and Charles Houdret oversaw the first courses in orchestration and courses in music history, solfège, and music dictation were led by professors Gabriel Cusson, Alfred Mignault, Jean Papineau-Couture, and Isabelle Ria Lenssens among others. Clermont Pépin oversaw the music composition program and Jean Vallerand served on both the faculty and as general secretary. Pépin was later appointed the school's third director in 1967. The violist Louis Bailly was also on the faculty and he founded Quatuor du Conservatoire in 1944, a string quartet in-residence at the CMQM during the mid-1940s.

Originally the CMQM was entirely an instrumental program, but the school added a vocal music program in 1951 with courses in opera and choral music. Roger Filiatrault was appointed the vocal program's first director, and teachers included Rachele Maragliano-Mori, Dick Marzollo, and Martial Singher. Around this same time the Orchestre du Conservatoire, a 65-player student orchestra, was formed. Among its directors have been conductors Raymond Dessaints, Charles Houdret, Roland Leduc, Rémus Tzincoca, and, since 1980, Raffi Armenian, the school's current director.

In 1956 the school moved to facilities on Saint Catherine Street and then to larger ones at the Palais du commerce at 1700 Berri Street in 1964. In 1975 the conservatoire moved to the former building of the Palais de justice de Montréal, at 100 Notre-Dame Street which housed two electroacoustic studios, three rehearsal rooms, 11 practice studios, and 38 teaching studios. The building also contained two performance halls where the school's ensembles, students, and faculty performed public concerts: the Salle Gabriel-Cusson which seats approximately 200 people and the Salle Germaine-Malépart which seats 125. By 1991 the Conservatoire's music library contained more than 56,000 books and scores, 111 current periodicals, and over 10,000 audiovisual documents.

Cellist Yuli Turovsky taught at the Conservatoire in the 1970s. In 1986 the school formed a chamber orchestra and in 1989 a wind orchestra was established under the direction of Alain Cazes. In autumn 2001, the CMQM moved to its current location at 4750 avenue Henri-Julien. A major fire on December 7, 2005 seriously damaged the conservatory's facilities. The Government of Quebec restored the facilities at a cost of 46 million dollars, and the new premises opened in the summer of 2008.

== List of directors ==
- Wilfrid Pelletier (1942–1961)
- Roland Leduc (1961–1967)
- Clermont Pépin (1967–1973)
- Gilberte Martin (1973–1974, interim)
- Raymond Daveluy (1974–1978)
- Gilles Gauthier (1978–1979, interim)
- Albert Grenier (1979–1998)
- Lorraine Prieur (1998–2000, interim)
- Isolde Lagacé (2000–2007)
- Raffi Armenian (2008–2013)

== Notable alumni ==
- Raynald Arseneault, composer and organist
- Colette Boky, operatic soprano
- Pierre Brabant, composer and pianist
- Boris Brott, conductor
- Angèle Dubeau, violinist
- Louis Dufort, composer
- Pierre Duval, operatic tenor
- Jacques Faubert, composer and conductor
- Maynard Ferguson, jazz trumpeter and bandleader
- Lewis Furey
- Gérald Gagnier, bandmaster, composer, and trumpeter
- Karina Gauvin, operatic soprano
- Monique Gendron, organist
- Kenneth Gilbert, harpsichordist, organist, and musicologist
- Violet Grant-States, clarinetist, member, Montreal Women's Symphony
- Jacques Hétu, composer
- Christopher Jackson, harpsichordist, organist, and conductor
- Jacques Lacombe, conductor
- Robert Langevin, flautist
- Jacques Larocque, saxophonist
- Jimmie LeBlanc, composer
- Marie-Nicole Lemieux, operatic contralto
- Bruce Xiaoyu Liu, pianist
- Paul Marcotte, french hornist
- Joseph Masella, french hornist
- Roger Matton, composer and ethnomusicologist
- Pierre Mercure, composer and bassoonist
- Robin Minard, composer
- François Morel, composer, pianist, and conductor
- Éric Morin, composer
- Yannick Nézet-Séguin, pianist and conductor
- Michel Perrault, composer, conductor, and percussionist
- Lina Pizzolongo, vocal coach and concert pianist
- André Prévost, composer
- Serge Provost, composer and organist
- Louis Quilico, operatic baritone
- Karen Quinton, pianist
- André Ristic, composer, pianist, accordion player, and music theorist
- Charles Richard-Hamelin, pianist
- Pierre Rolland, oboist, English horn player, radio broadcaster, music critic, and arts administrator.
- Joseph Rouleau, operatic bass
- Patrick Saint-Denis, composer
- Jean Saulnier, pianist
- Jeff Stinco, rock and punk guitarist for the band Simple Plan
- Diane Tell, singer-songwriter
- Olivier Thouin, violinist
- Huguette Tourangeau, operatic mezzo-soprano
- Gilles Tremblay (composer) (both student and teacher)
- Claude Vivier, composer

== Notable faculty ==
- Arthur Romano, professor of saxophone
