= André Hekking =

French cellist (1866–1925)

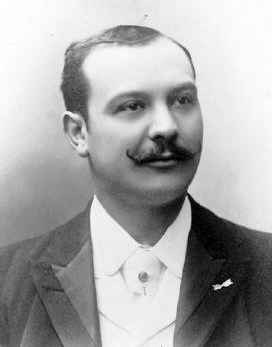
André Hekking

André Hekking (20 July 1866 – 14 December 1925) was a French cellist.

Born in Bordeaux, he studied with Charles Auguste de Bériot, touring Spain at fifteen. In 1909, he settled in Paris to become a teacher of the cello, having in the meantime gained a reputation throughout Europe as a virtuoso. He joined the faculty of the Conservatoire de Paris in 1918 and became a professor a year later. He also taught at the American Conservatory in Fontainebleau.

Among his notable pupils were the cellists Juan Ruiz Casaux, Charles Houdret, and Grace Vamos.

He died in Paris.

Hekking was the cousin of Gérard Hekking and the nephew of Anton Hekking, both cellists.
