= Henri Hekking =

Dutch medical officer (1902/03–1994)

- Born: 1902 or 1903; Surabaya, Dutch East Indies
- Died: 1994 (aged 91)
- Military career
- Allegiance: Netherlands
- Branch: Royal Netherlands East Indies Army
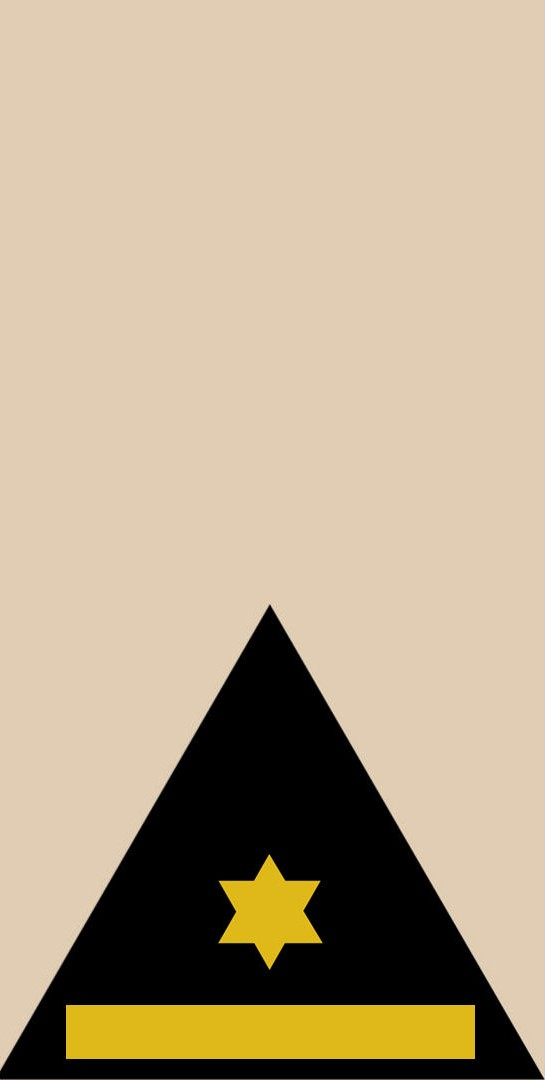
- Rank: Major
- Conflicts: World War II; Dutch East Indies campaign

Henri Hekking (1902/03–1994) was a Dutch medical officer with the Royal Netherlands East Indies Army (KNIL) noted for his service in Japanese prisoner-of-war camps during the Second World War.

Hekking was born and grew up in the Dutch East Indies. He attended the medical school at Leiden University in the Netherlands before entering service with the KNIL. He worked in Batavia and then on Celebes. By the time of the 1941 Japanese invasion Hekking was a captain stationed in Timor. Captured, he was separated from his wife and shipped to work with other prisoners of war on the Death Railway between Siam and Burma. Hekking was stationed in a camp of American prisoners and used herbalist techniques to treat medical conditions. He is credited with saving hundreds of lives during his captivity. After the war he lived in the Netherlands.

== Early life ==
Henri Hekking was born in Surabaya, Dutch East Indies, in 1902/03 to Dutch parents. His grandfather had commanded a fleet of Dutch merchant ships. His grandmother worked as a herbalist and healer in the colony and Hekking made a promise to her that he would help provide medical care to the natives. Hekking grew up in Java but moved to the Netherlands at the age of 16, his father's work having taken him there.

Hekking studied medicine at Leiden University on a Dutch army scholarship. He was afterwards tied into a ten-year contract with the Royal Netherlands East Indies Army. Hekking worked as a medical officer and was posted first to Batavia and then to a hospital on Celebes. He remained for five years on the island before being posted to Timor.

By 1941 he was married to May and had two children: a son, Fred, and a daughter, Loukie. He had reached the rank of captain and was known among local villagers as "Bapak" (father) because of his medical work.

== Second World War ==
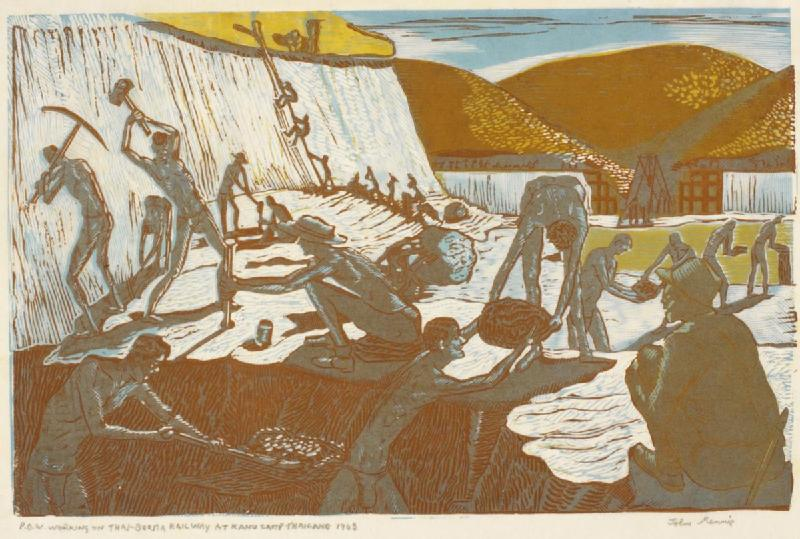
A contemporary depiction of emaciated prisoners working on the Death Railway by John Mennie.

Hekking was captured on Timor by the Japanese during their 1941–42 invasion of the Dutch East Indies. He escaped being executed on capture, as many prisoners of war were, by providing medical care to a wounded Kenpeitai officer. Hekking was moved to Changi Prison in Singapore, leaving behind his wife and children in a Japanese prison camp. He was held briefly at Changi before being transported to Thanbyuzayat in Japanese-occupied Burma to work on the Death Railway between that country and Siam. The Japanese used 60,000 Allied prisoners of war and civilians and 200,000 impressed locals to construct the railway in appalling conditions of disease, malnutrition and torture. More than 12,000 prisoners and tens of thousands of labourers died during the works.

The railway workforce was housed in makeshift camps stretched along the route. The British prisoners did not recognise Hekking's medical qualifications and refused his service, as such Hekking sat for a while at the holding camp at Thanbyuzayat. A group of American prisoners learnt of Hekking and two officers used their watches to bribe the Japanese to allocate Hekking to their camp. He joined them at camp Kilo 40, named for its distance in kilometres east of Thanbyuzayat.

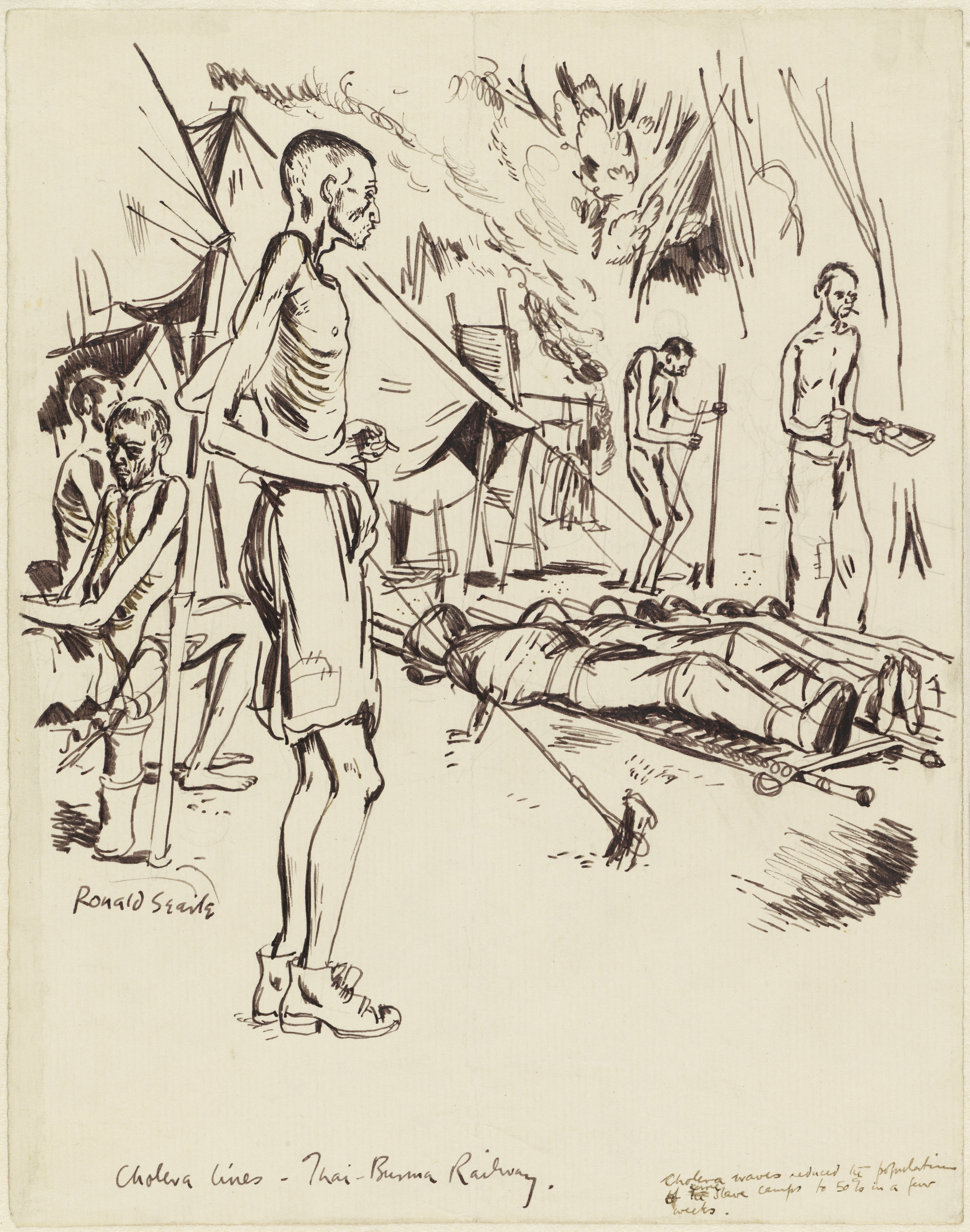
A contemporary depiction of sick and dead prisoners on the Death Railway by Ronald Searle.

With limited medicines provided by the Japanese Hekking used his knowledge of South-East Asian herbs to treat the men in his camp. He described to the prisoners the herbs that they should look out for in the jungle and also escaped the camp at night to gather them himself. During these trips, he also treated the sick and injured in local villages. One of the herbs Hekking used was Carapichea ipecacuanha as a treatment for dysentery: after demonstrating its effectiveness on one patient, Hekking was permitted to search the jungle for more of the herb by the camp's Japanese commandant. He also used leaves to heal cuts and beans to make a bitter tonic that reduced fever. Moreover, he harvested mould from pomelo fruit and used it to treat diphtheria, meningitis and tetanus, as well as a preventative for infection in cuts. A 1945 study of the mould at a Bangkok hospital found it to be a form of penicillin. Hekking also experimented with using maggots to clean wounds and ulcers. Other European medical officers in the camps disapproved of Hekking's herbal treatments.

Hekking also used the placebo effect to his advantage. He would tell the patient that he had saved a powerful medicine for them, but gave them an injection of saline only. He favoured debridement of infected ulcers, rather than the amputation favoured by other doctors. He lacked anaesthesia and removed the rotten flesh from patients with a sharpened silver spoon while they were held down. Hekking was assisted by American marine "Packrat" McCone who improvised surgical instruments from cutlery and items stolen from the Japanese.

Hekking also treated some Japanese soldiers, particularly for venereal disease. Sometimes he sent them to purchase medicines which he then set aside for his patients, injecting the Japanese soldier with a placebo instead. On other occasions he prescribed them acid to rub onto their skin. He also manufactured fake sulfapyridine tablets from plaster and rice flour, he traded these with the Japanese for quinine and other real medicine.

Hekking was considered by historian Kelly E. Crager as "perhaps the most successful doctor" to work with American prisoners of war on the Death Railway and is described by one former prisoner as having saved hundreds of lives during his period of captivity. His camp had the lowest death rates of any of the camps set on the railway. According to one of his patients, only 13 of the 191 prisoners in Kilo 40 died in the 18 months Hekking served there, compared to 120 dead in a nearby camp of around 470 men.

== Post-war ==
After the war Hekking moved to the Netherlands with his family and worked at the Institute of Tropical Medicine in Amsterdam. He retired from the army with the rank of major. In 1956 he received several honours from the American Lost Battalion Association (many of whose members he had treated during the war) and attended their annual reunion. On 25 December 1978 Hekking signed an affidavit supporting veterans of the battalion and survivors of the crew of the USS Houston, with whom he had also been imprisoned, in claiming from the US Veterans Administration who doubted the complexity of their illnesses.

Later in life Hekking was interviewed by historian H. Robert Charles for his study of the Death Railway camps, published in 2006 as Last Man Out. Hekking died in 1994, aged 91.
