= Mykola Kolessa =

Ukrainian composer and conductor

Mykola Kolessa Микола Колесса Shevchenko National Prize laureate
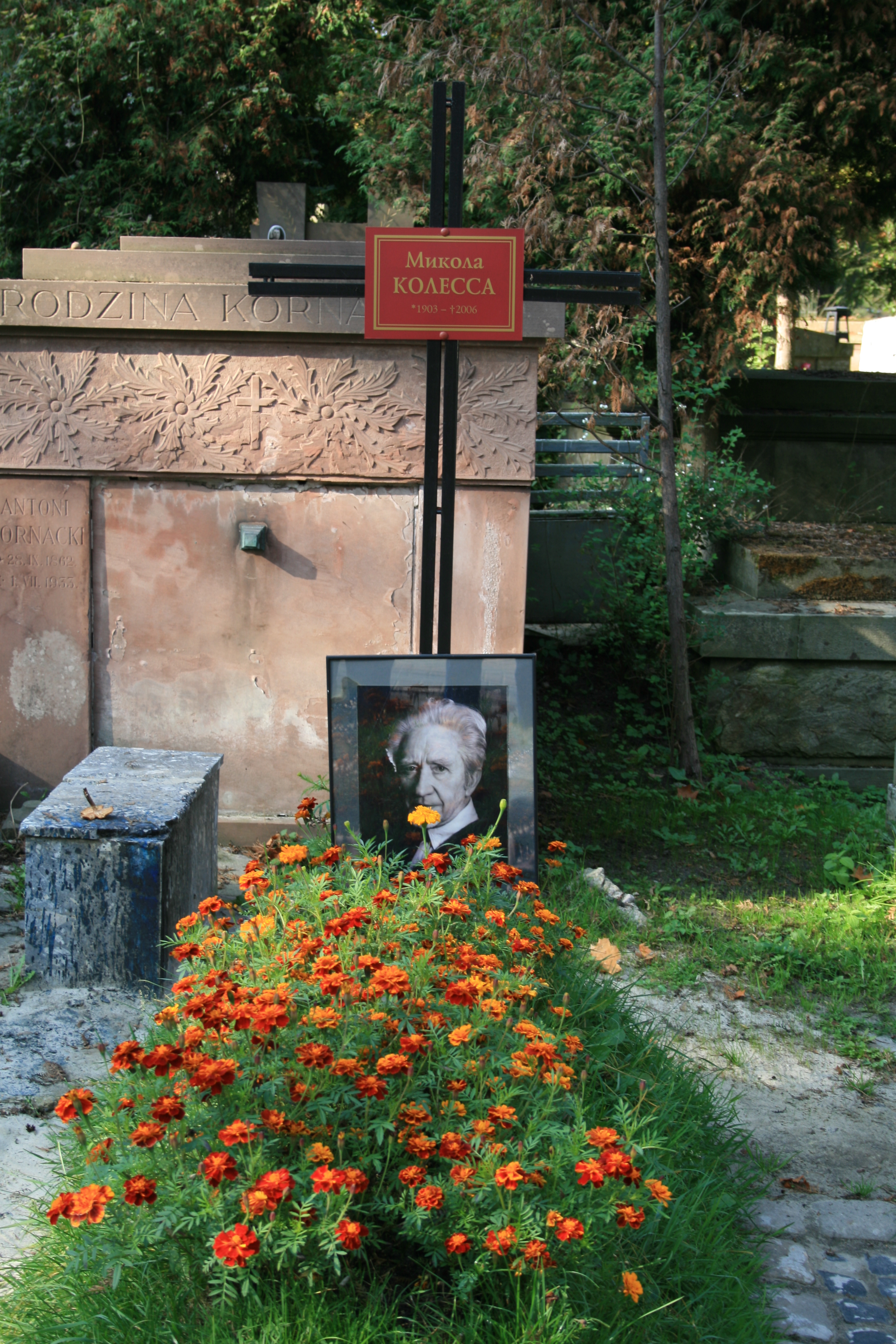

Background information
- Born: December 6, 1903; Sambir, Austria-Hungary (present-day Ukraine)
- Died: 8 June 2006 (aged 102) Lviv, Ukraine
- Genres: Classical
- Occupations: Composer, conductor, professor
- Instrument: Piano

Mykola Filaretovych Kolessa (Note: Ukrainian: Микола Філаретович Колесса, romanized: Mykola Filaretovych Kolessa) (6 December 1903 – 8 June 2006) was a Ukrainian composer and conductor, born in Sambir near Lviv.

His father Filaret Kolessa was a Ukrainian ethnomusicologist and composer and his cousin was the pianist Lubka Kolessa. He graduated from Lysenko Higher Musical Institute, then studied in Prague under Vítězslav Novák and Otakar Ostrčil, and taught at Lviv Conservatory. He also studied conducting with Pavel Dědeček.

His works include two symphonies (1949 and 1966), symphonic variations (1931), a 'Ukrainian Suite' (1928), all for orchestra, and 'In the Mountains' for string orchestra (1972), and a number of chamber and incidental works as well as some song cycles. His composition style was tonal and conservative and has been linked to that of Alexander Glazunov, although influences from Bartok and the early 20th-century French school can be heard as well. As a conductor he worked with ensembles such as the Lviv Philharmonic Orchestra, the Ballet Theater, the Ukrainian Radio Symphony Orchestra, and the Trembita Choir, becoming the founder of the Lviv conducting school.

During the course of his teaching career, Kolessa nurtured more than a hundred choral and orchestral conductors. He also taught composition, where one of his more notable students includes Ukrainian composer and teacher, Myroslav Skoryk.
