= Saint-Sulpice Library =

Library in Montreal, Quebec, Canada

Coordinates: 45°30′55″N 73°33′51″W

Saint-Sulpice Library Bibliothèque Saint-Sulpice
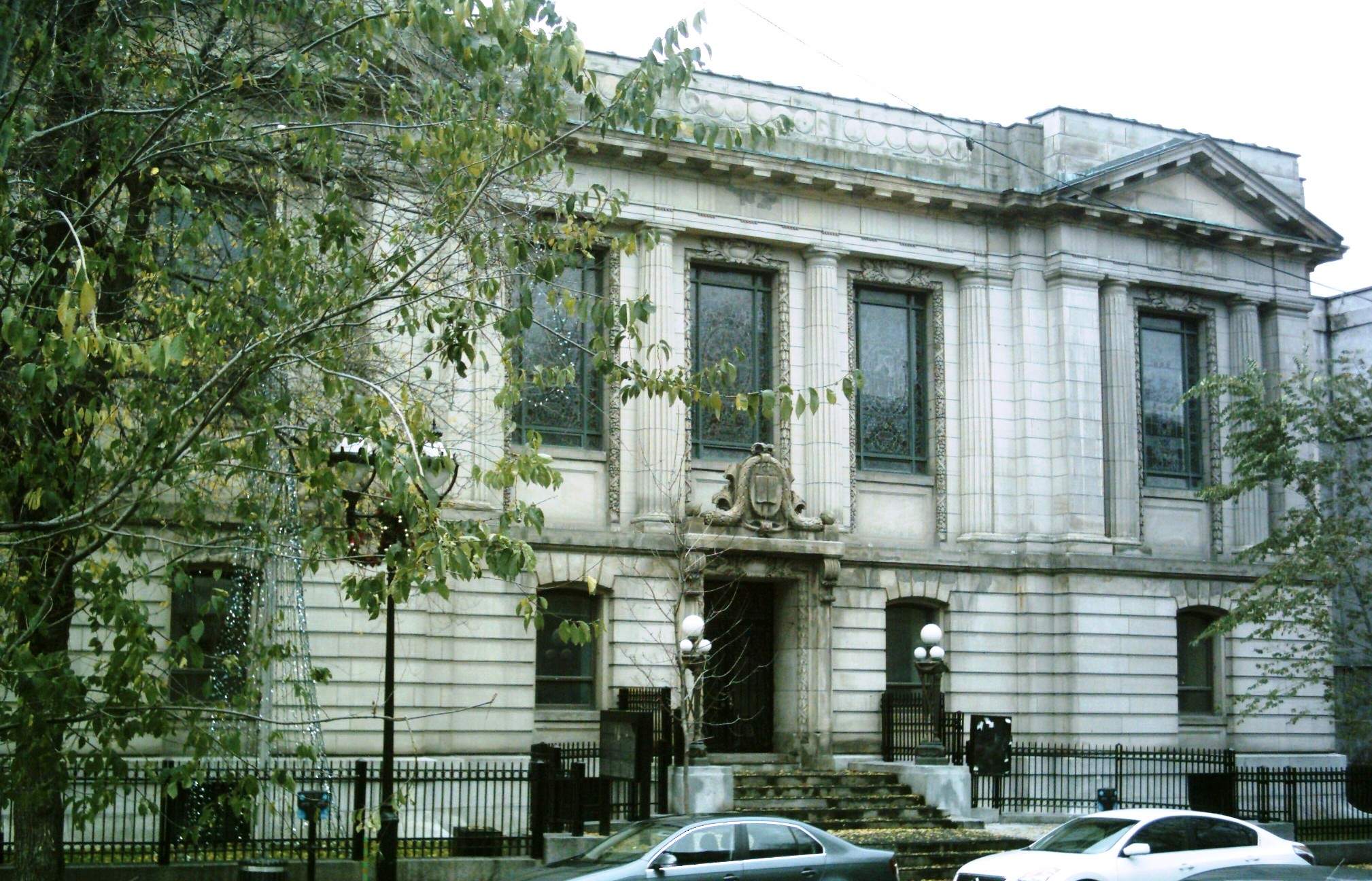
- Type: heritage building, former public library in Montreal, Quebec, Canada.
- Established: 1914
- Architect: Eugène Payette

Collection
- Items collected: (formerly) books, e-books, music, cds, periodicals, maps, genealogical archives, business directories, local history,

The Saint-Sulpice Library is an historic building located at 1700 Saint Denis Street in Montreal, Quebec, Canada. It was designated a Historic Monument of Quebec in 1988.

At the dawn of the 20th century, the political elite and religious leaders of Montreal recognized the need for creating a new francophone library that would elevate the education level of the population. The selection of books offered by the Cabinet de lecture paroissiale, previously created by the Sulpicians, was becoming obsolete and outdated for the time according to critics. The Sulpicians initiated the construction of a new library on Saint-Denis Street to offer Montrealers better readings combining part of their own collections with the ones owned by Université Laval à Montréal (Université de Montréal). The Saint-Sulpice Library was intended primarily for students, scholars and academics but also for Catholics seeking self-education. Designed by architect Eugène Payette, the Saint-Sulpice Library is considered one of the finest examples of Beaux-Arts architecture in the province.

Built between 1912 and 1914, the building opened as a private library operated by the Society of Saint-Sulpice in 1917. It was notably the first French-language library in the nation of Canada. While the library was built by Eugene Payette, the Sulpicians hired a professional librarian Aegidius Fauteux, for conserving and developing a collection dedicated for research. From its opening in 1915 to its closure in 1931, Fauteux assumed his role by transforming the nature of the collection by acquiring titles that would support the educational mission of the library. To get ready for the opening, he acquired tens of thousands of works between 1913 and 1916. He also developed the special collections by including maps, portraits, medals, ex-libris and rare books. Not only the library offered a variety of books and periodicals but cultural activities and a centre dedicated to pictorial arts under the supervision of Olivier Maurault, priest of Saint-Sulpice. In 1931, Fauteux left the Bibliothèque Saint-Sulpice to become the director of the Public Library of Montreal and founded the first French library school in Canada. In the 1960s the library folded due to waning membership. Its large collection was donated to the newly formed Bibliothèque et Archives nationales du Québec in 1967 and the Ministry of Culture and Communications (Quebec) purchased the building.

In 2005 the Université du Québec à Montréal bought the building, but was forced to sell it back to the ministry of culture due to financial reasons in 2007. In 2008 plans were announced to turn the building into a music centre that will house Le Vivier, a group of 22 Quebec music groups. Le Vivier presented its first season of 15 concerts from September 2009 to May 2010. In 2016, it was announced the building will be used as a new technology incubator and library for teens.
