= GORO Mountain Resort =

Ski resort in Ukraine

- Location within Carpathian Mountains Location within Ukraine
- Location: Skole Beskids (Eastern Beskids)
- Nearest city: Slavsko, Lviv Oblast
- Coordinates: 48°48′00″N 23°26′31″E
- Website: gororesort.com

GORO Mountain Resort is a year-round mountain resort 5 km north of the resort town of Slavsko in the Lviv Oblast (Eastern Beskydy) at the foot of the Vysoky Verkh mountain range at an altitude of 650 m above sea level and near the villages of Volosyanka and Verkhnya Rozhanka, under construction since October 2024. It is the first resort in Ukraine with an all-season gondola lift on the site of the longest double-chair lift in Ukraine (served about 520 thousand people in 2021-2025). The project area is 1,200 hectares.

In a presentation on the International Report on Snow and Mountain Tourism, Laurent Vanat, an international expert in ski resort benchmarking, referred to GORO as a new resort planned for Ukraine and presented it alongside projects designed to meet international ski resort standards.

== History ==
In 2015, the Ukrainian energy and retail business group OKKO Group and the operator of the nationwide OKKO filling station chain developed plans to diversify their business activities.

The decision coincided with the launch of Ukraine’s decentralisation reform, which allowed local communities to retain a larger share of payroll taxes generated by businesses operating in their regions. The company’s founders chose tourism as a strategic direction and selected the Slavsko area (near Stryi urban hromada) in the Ukrainian Carpathians, as the site for a large-scale mountain resort. The project’s co-founders are Vitaliy Antonov, founder of OKKO Group, and Vasyl Danyliak, the group’s CEO. Both were born in the town of Stryi, Lviv Oblast.

In 2015, the OKKO Group’s management considered transferring the registration of its business to the Slavsko, one of the local Amalgamated hromadas in the Lviv region.

In 2016, OKKO Group began working with ILF Consulting Engineers, an international engineering and consulting company, on the development of the project concept and technical planning. They conducted several years of field research, issued the resort's first master plan near Vysoky Verkh mountain in 2018. Examples to follow include Sellaronda, Sölden, Ischgl, and Kitzbühel. The master plan scale covers 1,200 hectares, including 360 hectares allocated to mountain and ski infrastructure.

In 2017, plans by OKKO Group to invest in tourism infrastructure in the Slavsko area and develop a mountain resort became publicly known through media reports.

In 2022, the OKKO Group purchased the local Zakhar Berkut ski complex (2005) to expand the resort's territory. The resort's infrastructure included a 24-room hotel, the Vysoky Verkh restaurant on the mountaintop, two lifts, a network of ski runs, and the longest double-chair lift in Ukraine, which has served about 520,000 guests (2022-2026).

In spring 2022, OKKO Group planned to begin construction of the resort’s first phase, with about US$100 million allocated for mountain infrastructure. The start of construction was postponed after Russia’s full-scale invasion of Ukraine in February 2022. Despite the delay, the company continued the project's design and planning, as well as further development of the resort concept.

In spring 2022, OKKO Group planned to begin construction of the resort’s first phase, with about US$100 million allocated for mountain infrastructure. The start of construction was postponed after Russia’s full-scale invasion of Ukraine in February 2022. Despite the delay, the company continued the project's design and planning, as well as further development of the resort concept.

In October 2024, the project was officially named GORO Mountain Resort. In October 2024, the development of the resort began. The first phase, with a total area of 127 hectares, will include 10 ski slopes and 5 hotel complexes (9 hotels) with 1,100+ rooms, along with recreational infrastructure.

In 2025, during the signing of the agreement with GORO, the Minister of Economy Yulia Svyrydenko (who became Prime Minister of Ukraine in July 2025) stated, "Despite the war, investors are investing in the development of Ukrainian regions. Two more projects with significant investments have received state support - Slavski and Rozhanka Park, which together will invest EUR140 million in the development of recreation in the Carpathians. In partnership with local authorities, they will create new tourist infrastructure, and budgets at all levels will receive about UAH 7.3 billion in revenue over 15 years. We also expect that the company will create new jobs with wages higher than the average in this region".

In June, as a major investment project in the Lviv region, GORO received state support, including a range of government incentives for investors under the state program for projects with significant investment in Ukraine. It is part of the “Made in Ukraine” policy, a government initiative aimed at creating conditions for the development of domestic production, attracting investment into the real economy, and promoting non-commodity exports.

Two trilateral special investment agreements were signed between the Cabinet of Ministers of Ukraine, the Slavsko Village Council, and Slavski LLC, Rozhanka Park LLC (legal entities developing the GORO Mountain Resort project). GORO Mountain Resort undertakes to invest at least UAH 4.9 billion, in accordance with the schedule agreed with the state. The company have to create jobs with wages exceeding the average in the Lviv region by more than 40%, with the minimum contractual requirement of +15%. The state support program provides an exemption from income tax (up to 5 years) and import duty and import VAT on new equipment; compensation for the costs of engineering infrastructure after the completion of construction, and a preferential right to use the land plot.

Subsequently, the Government of Ukraine approved the list and volumes of equipment and components that Slavski LLC (Lviv) may import into Ukraine to implement of the investment project.

In the same year, the project secured its first loan from FUIB,to finance the construction of the resort’s Welcome Centre.

In the summer of 2025, GORO began construction of the local ATC's power supply system, comprising two phases with a total capacity of 17.7 MW, a length of 15 km, and an investment of EUR 11,000,000.

On March 3, 2026, preparatory work for the construction of the first year-round gondola cable car in Ukraine began.

In May 2026, GORO Mountain Resort signed a contract with DEMACLENKO to supply an automated snowmaking system for the resort’s first phase. The system is expected to cover all first-phase ski slopes and support a ski season of more than 100 days, with an estimated investment of €25 million. The total cost of the resort’s first phase is estimated at €470 million, including €120 million for mountain infrastructure and €350 million for hotel infrastructure.

In May 2026, GORO Mountain Resort signed a EUR 20 million contract with Doppelmayr Group for the supply and installation of a 2.8 km gondola ropeway for the resort’s first phase. The gondola, expected to be the longest in Ukraine, is part of a EUR 47 million ropeway system that will also include two 1.5 km chairlifts with wind protection.

== Scale and size ==
The resort area is 1,200 hectares, of which 360 hectares are planned for mountain and ski infrastructure, and more than 800 hectares for the development of hotel, commercial and recreational facilities.

Over the next 15 years, GORO plans to build 41 ski slopes, 75 km long with 100% of snow cover, 17.5 km of ski lifts, including two modern gondola lifts and 11 chairlifts, as well as Welcome and Mountain centres. It is planned to build 25 hotels with 5,150 rooms.

There will be the first in Ukraine and the longest all-season gondola lift (2.8 km) and the longest ski run (3.8 km). The total investment in GORO Mountain Resort is estimated to be about $1.5 billion. Of this amount, OKKO Group plans to invest $500 million from its own funds and credit funds, and to raise an additional $1 billion from other investors.

== Operations ==
In 2027, the first stage of the resort is expected to begin operations, including a 2,800-metre gondola cable car, two chairlifts, three ski slopes, and the Welcome Centre.

In 2028, nine hotels, including three ONDE Hotels and Mountain Centre, are expected to begin operations. Upon completion of the first stage, the resort will operate 10 ski slopes totalling 13 km in length, covering approximately 50 hectares. The resort’s first phase will have a capacity of up to 1 million visitors per year.

The resort is planned to be fully completed by 2039. The first phase of the resort is expected to create approximately 6,000 jobs, while the fully completed resort could generate up to 25,000 jobs.

There will be 75 km of ski slopes for skiing and snowboarding across 342 hectares, with 100% artificial snow, sports grounds, and infrastructure for hiking, cycling, and climbing.

== Sports ==
In 2025, the resort became a strategic partner of the Biathlon Federation of Ukraine until April 2026. The partner's logo is featured on the equipment of Ukrainian biathletes during international and national starts. GORO Mountain Resort also provides systematic support to the national team in preparation for major starts, in particular the Biathlon World Cup and the 2026 Winter Olympics.

GORO's future ski slopes are designed to FIS standards, enabling international-level competitions, including World Cup stages. The resort's slopes are suitable for training in all alpine skiing disciplines and can be used by both children's and youth sports schools and professional teams.

== Environmental and social impact ==
After the re-registration of Okko structures in Slavsko in 2018, more than 60% of the taxes on the salaries of 15,000 employees of the holding company are paid to the local budget. As of 2025, the group has already paid about UAH 1.84 billion in taxes to the Slavsko hromada (community), which is 70-80% of its annual local budget. The community directs these funds toward capital repairs of roads, the modernisation of educational and medical infrastructure, and the overall improvement of village amenities.

In the spring of 2025, GORO Mountain Resort, in partnership with OKSLGP “Halsillis”, a regional forestry enterprise in the Lviv region, launched a forest restoration program in the Carpathians. They planted 2,000 coniferous saplings on 2.5 hectares (500 European larches, 500 Douglas firs, and 1,000 firs).

In autumn 2025, the GORO signed a 15-year memorandum with “Halsillis” to plant one million trees in the Carpathians. In 2025, around 50,000 saplings were planted across more than 12 hectares. Approximately 70 hectares are planned for clearing to make way for ski slopes, while about 240 hectares are planned for forest restoration.

Up to a third of all construction materials must be produced by a national manufacturer.

In April 2026, the GORO team, together with foresters, community representatives and schoolchildren, planted 8,000 young coniferous trees across an area of 2.8 hectares. In total, nearly 60,000 seedlings have already been planted across approximately 15 hectares.

== Owners and other project members ==
- OKKO Group (Ukraine), owner, investor, and developer
- Slavski LLC (Ukraine), master planning and the I-phase mountain infrastructure construction company.
- ILF Group (Austria),master plan and ski infrastructure.
- GORO Development, real estate development and construction of the resort's hotel infrastructure.
- PKF Hospitality (Austria), investment analysis and concept consultancy. Part of the CBRE Group.
- Doppelmayr (Austria), design, supply and installation of the first-phase ropeway system, including a 2.8 km gondola lift and two 1.5 km wind-protected chairlifts.
- Rozhanka Group LLC (Ukraine), construction of the II-III phase mountain infrastructure company.
- Demaclenko (Italy), design and construction of the resort’s automated snowmaking system.

== Critics ==
In 2026, the German authorities were forced to officially refute fake news circulating on TikTok about financing the resort's construction.

Fact-checking materials were published in several countries simultaneously, refuting Russian propaganda about the construction of this project.

== See also ==
- OKKO
- Bukovel
- Trostian
