= Zavadiv, Stryi Raion, Lviv Oblast =

Rural locality in Lviv Oblast, Ukraine

Zavadiv Завадів
- Village
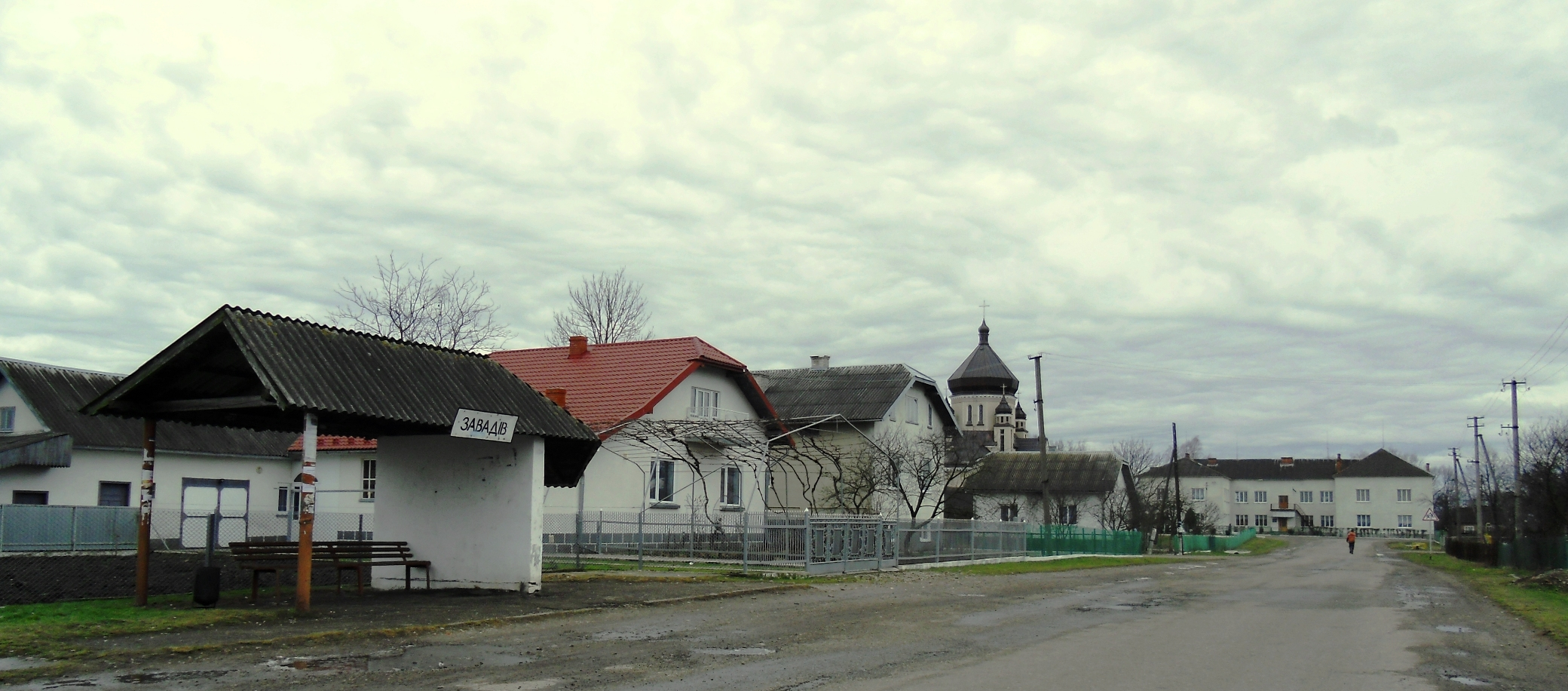

- Location within Lviv Oblast
- Coordinates: 49°15′12″N 23°25′54″E
- Country: Ukraine
- Oblast: Lviv Oblast
- District: Stryi Raion
- Established: 1504

Area
  - Total: 1,589 km^{2} (614 sq mi)
- Elevation /(average value of): 304 m (997 ft)

Population
  - Total: 1,197
  - Density: 7,533/km^{2} (19,510/sq mi)
- Time zone: UTC+2 (EET)
  - Summer (DST): UTC+3 (EEST)
- Postal code: 82433
- Area code: +380 3245
- Website: село Завадів ^{(Ukrainian)}

Zavadiv (Ukrainian: Зава́дів) – village (selo) in the Stryi Raion, Lviv Oblast (province) of Western Ukraine. It belongs to Stryi urban hromada, one of the hromadas of Ukraine. The first written mention dates back to the year 1504. Local government is administered by Zavadivska village council. The population of the village is just about 1197 people.

== Geography ==
The village Zavadiv is located in the Stryiskyi district (Stryi Raion) at a distance 8 kilometres (5.0 mi) from the district center Stryi, 78 kilometres (48 mi) from the regional center of Lviv and 27 kilometres (17 mi) from the City of regional significance Drohobych. It is located near the village Holobutiv.

== Personalities and sights ==
The village has of monumental art sights of local importance.

- Taras Shevchenko monument (stone, 1914 – 1916) (N864).
- Ostap Nyzhankivsky monument (marble chips, bronze, 1989) (N1719)
- Ivan Franko monument (marble chips, bronze, 1989) (N1721)
- Taras Shevchenko monument (marble chips, bronze, 1989) (N1723)

Ostap Nyzhankivsky lived for a time in the village Zavadiv. He was initiator the construction and opening of the monument to Taras Shevchenko. Taras Shevchenko monument built in the village in 1916. It is the oldest monument to Taras Shevchenko, where the poet is depicted in the full size.

== Gallery ==
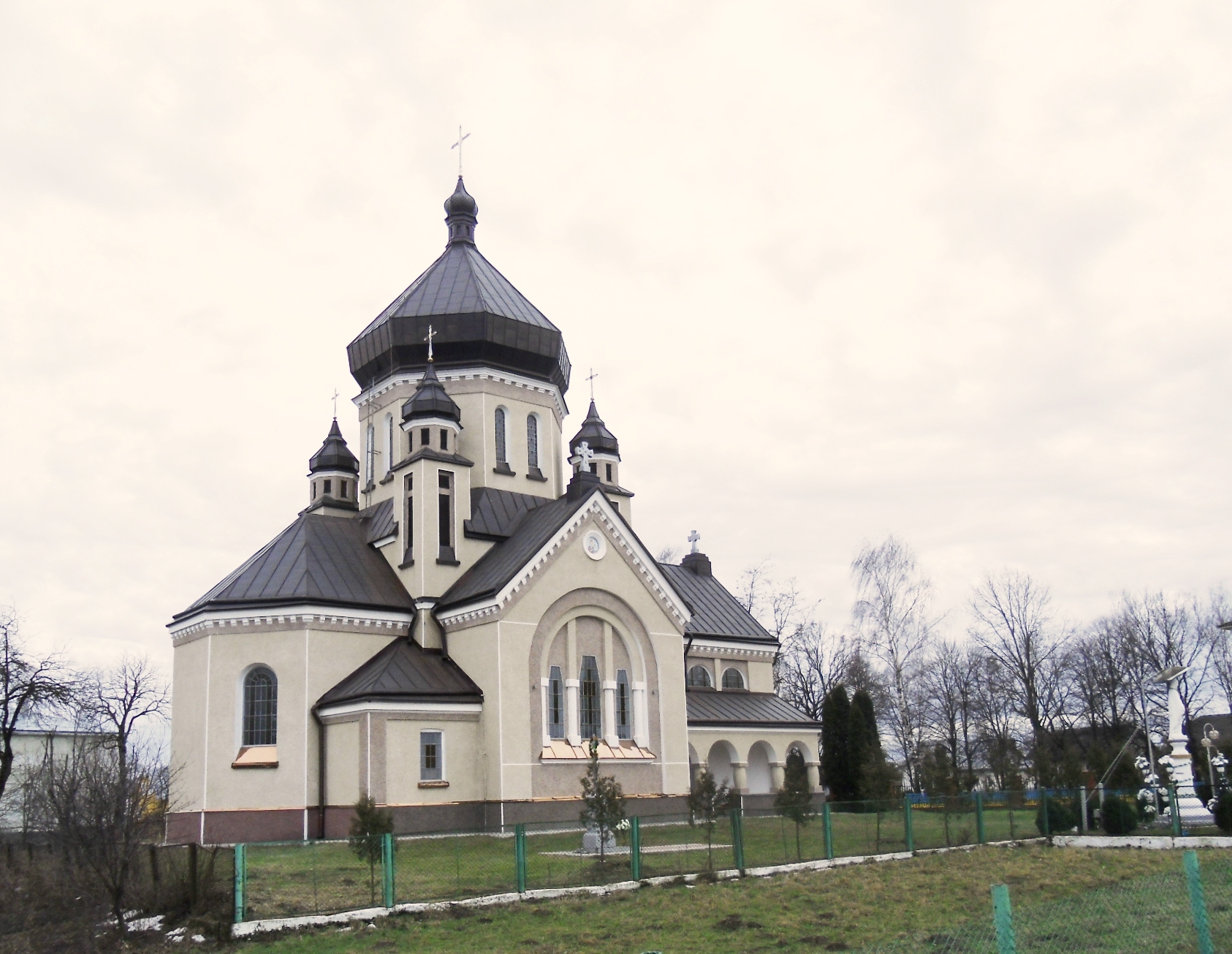
Church of St. Archangel Michael

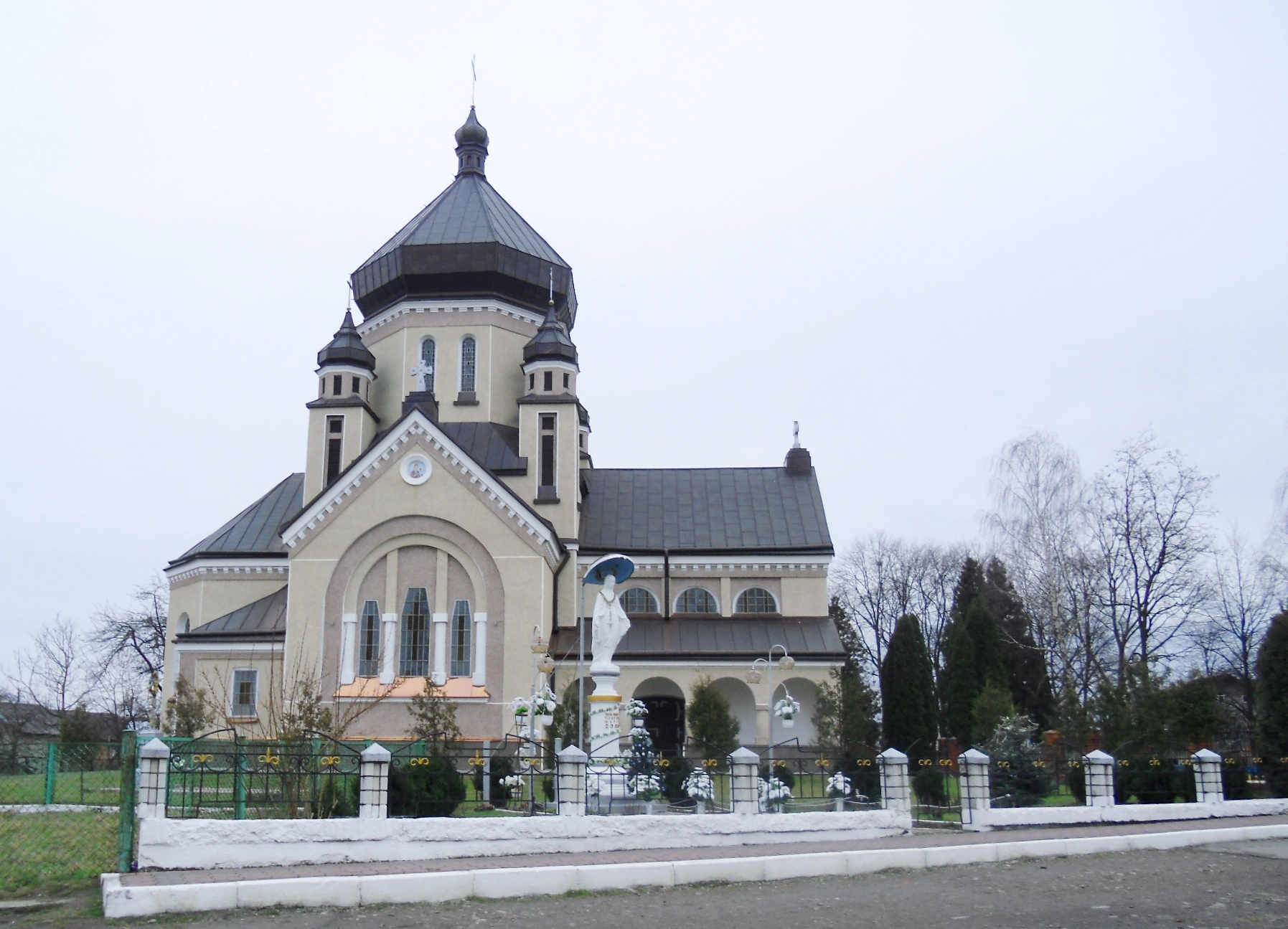
Church of St. Archangel Michael

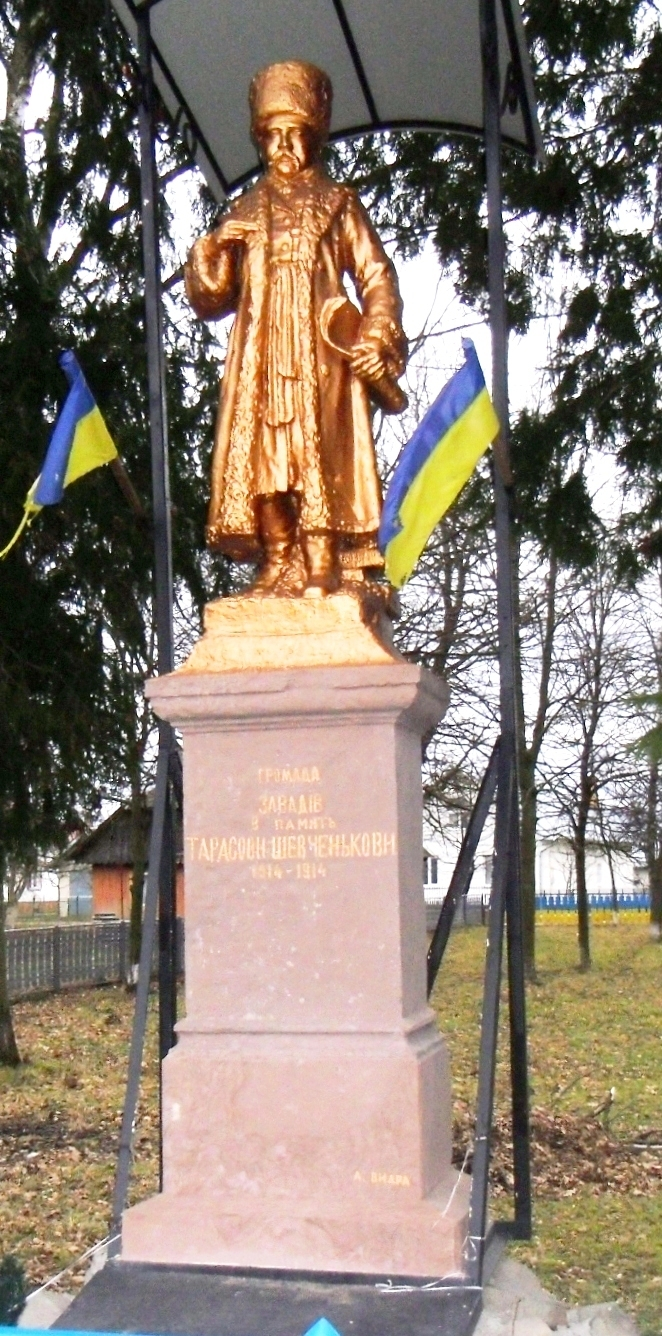
One of the oldest monuments to Taras Shevchenko

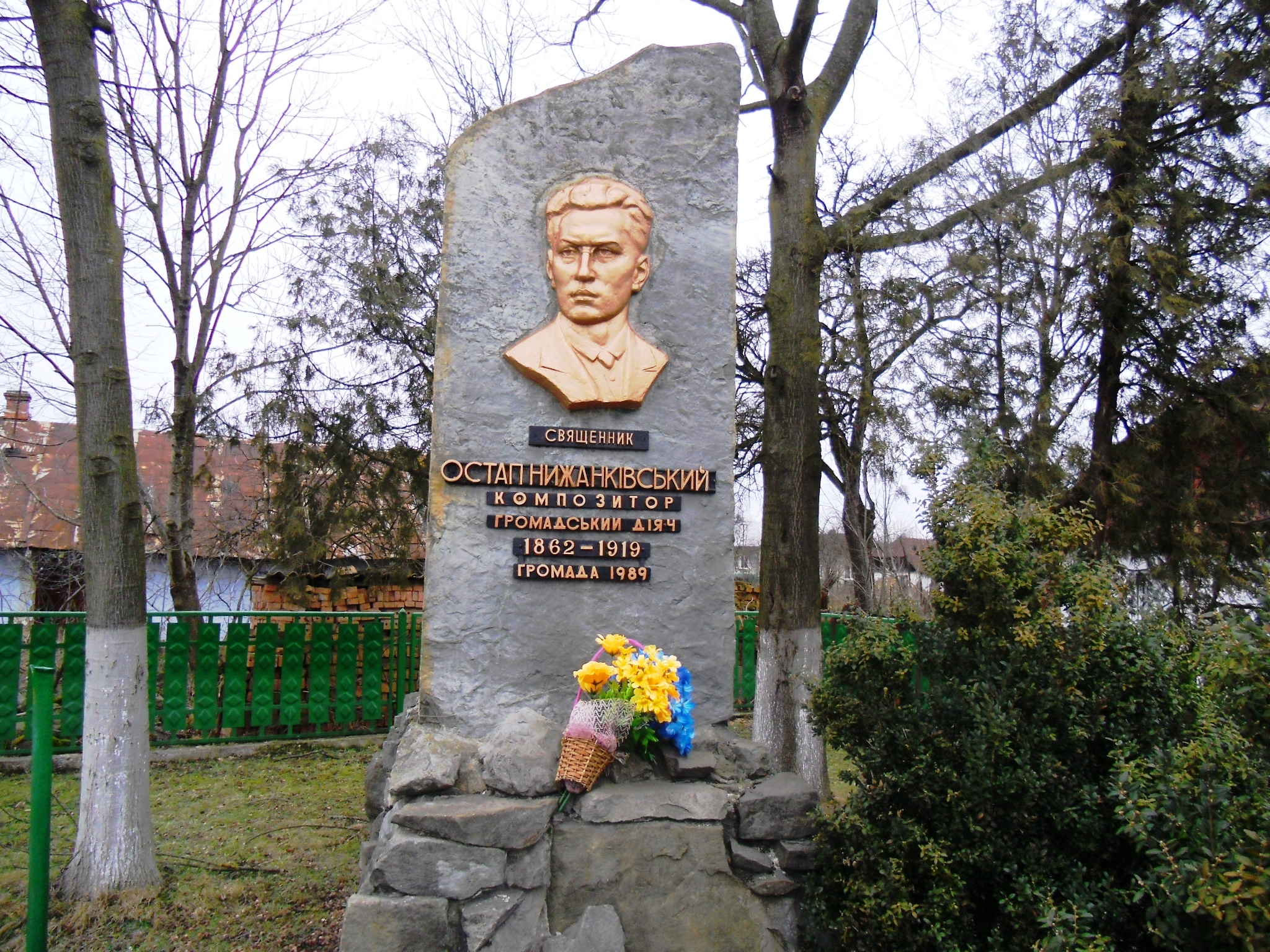
Ostap Nyzhankivsky (Ukrainian writer, composer and priest)

== Literature ==
- Ukrainian: Історія міст і сіл УРСР : Львівська область. – К. : ГРУРЕ, 1968 р., сторінка 834
