= Nezhukhiv =

Rural locality in Lviv Oblast, Ukraine

Nezhukhiv Нежухів
- Village
- Location within Lviv Oblast
- Coordinates: 49°16′16″N 23°47′21″E
- Country: Ukraine
- Oblast: Lviv Oblast
- District: Stryi Raion
- Established: 1456

Area
  - Total: 171 km^{2} (66 sq mi)
- Elevation /(average value of): 295 m (968 ft)

Population
  - Total: 1,974
  - Density: 11,544/km^{2} (29,900/sq mi)
- Time zone: UTC+2 (EET)
  - Summer (DST): UTC+3 (EEST)
- Postal code: 82431
- Area code: +380 3245
- Website: село Нежухів ^{(Ukrainian)}

Nezhukhiv (Ukrainian: Нежу́хів) – village (selo), which is located in Stryi Raion, Lviv Oblast, of Western Ukraine. It belongs to Stryi urban hromada, one of the hromadas of Ukraine.

Village, which is situated on the way Stryi — Drohobych and lies at a distance 76 kilometres (47 mi) from the city of Lviv, 6 kilometres (3.7 mi) from Stryi and 24 kilometres (15 mi) from Drohobych. Local government — Nezhukhivska village council.

The first written mention dates back to year 1456.

== Famous people ==
- Michael Datsyshyn (November 20, 1914 - December 14, 1993) – village pastor Ukrainian Greek Catholic Church from 1945 to 1954.

== Gallery ==
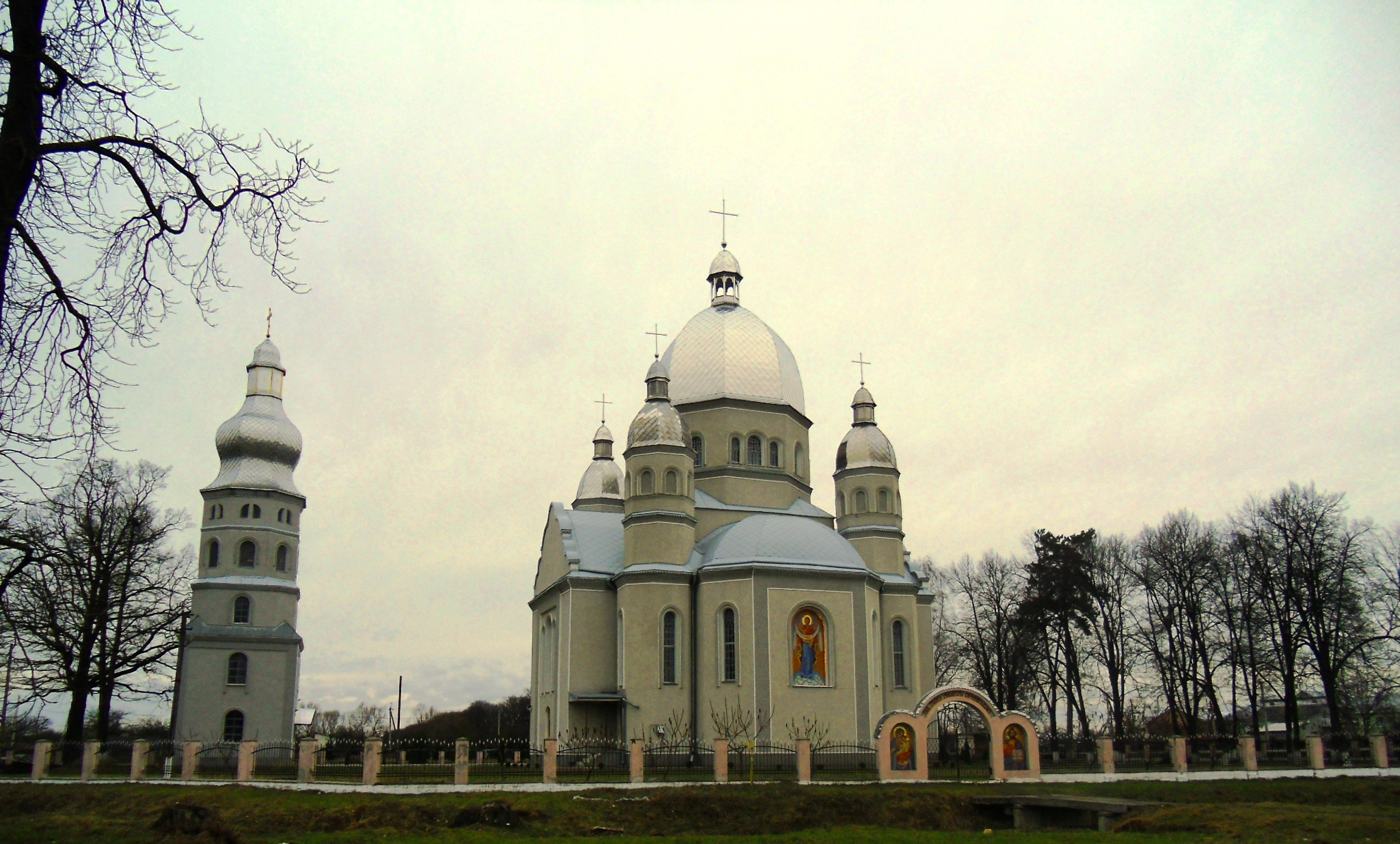
Nezhukhiv. Church of the Intercession Ukrainian Orthodox Church of the Kyivan Patriarchate.

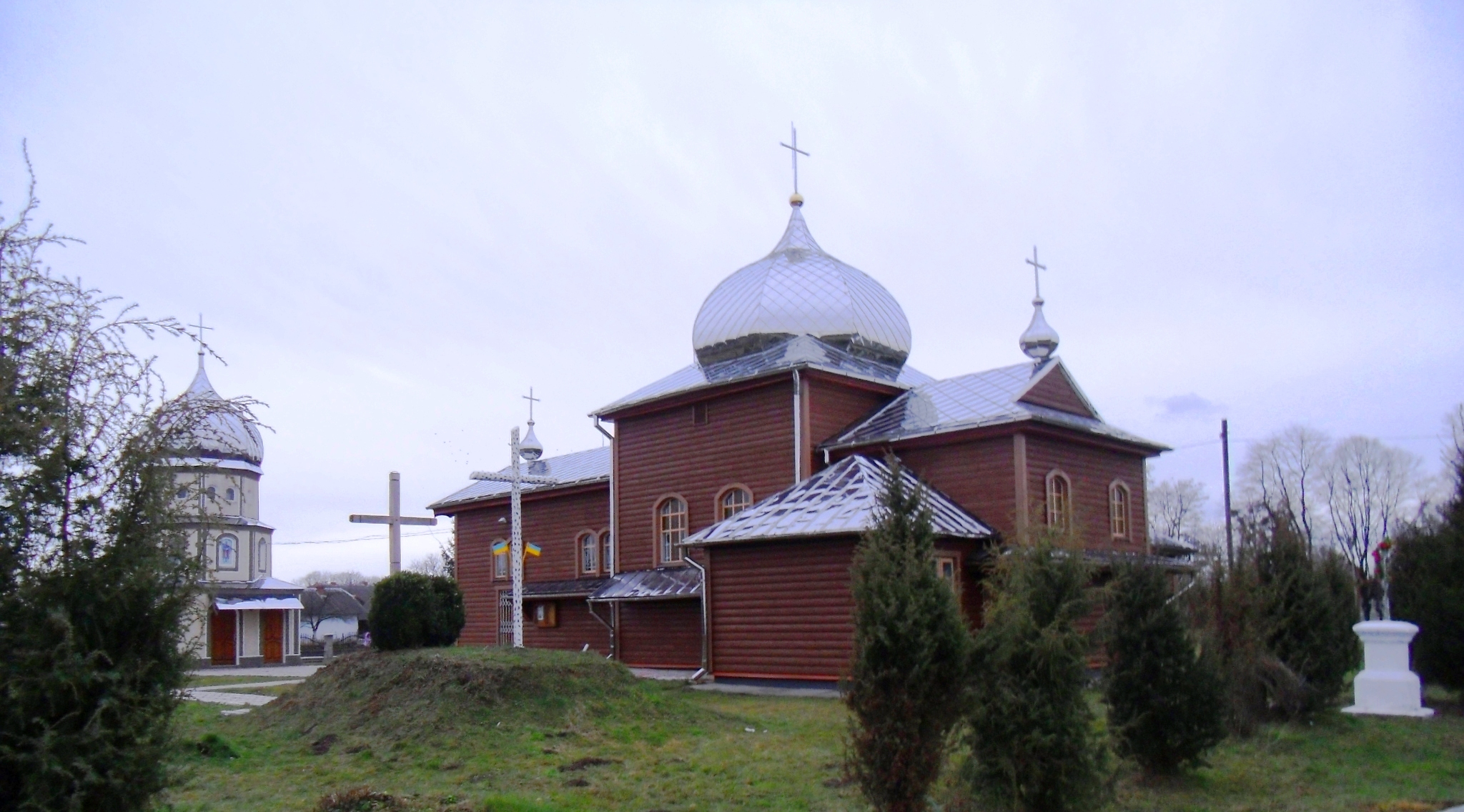
Church of the Intercession Virgin Mary (1875). Nezhukhiv (Stryi Raion).
