= Yarema Kavatsiv =

Ukrainian footballer (born 1986)

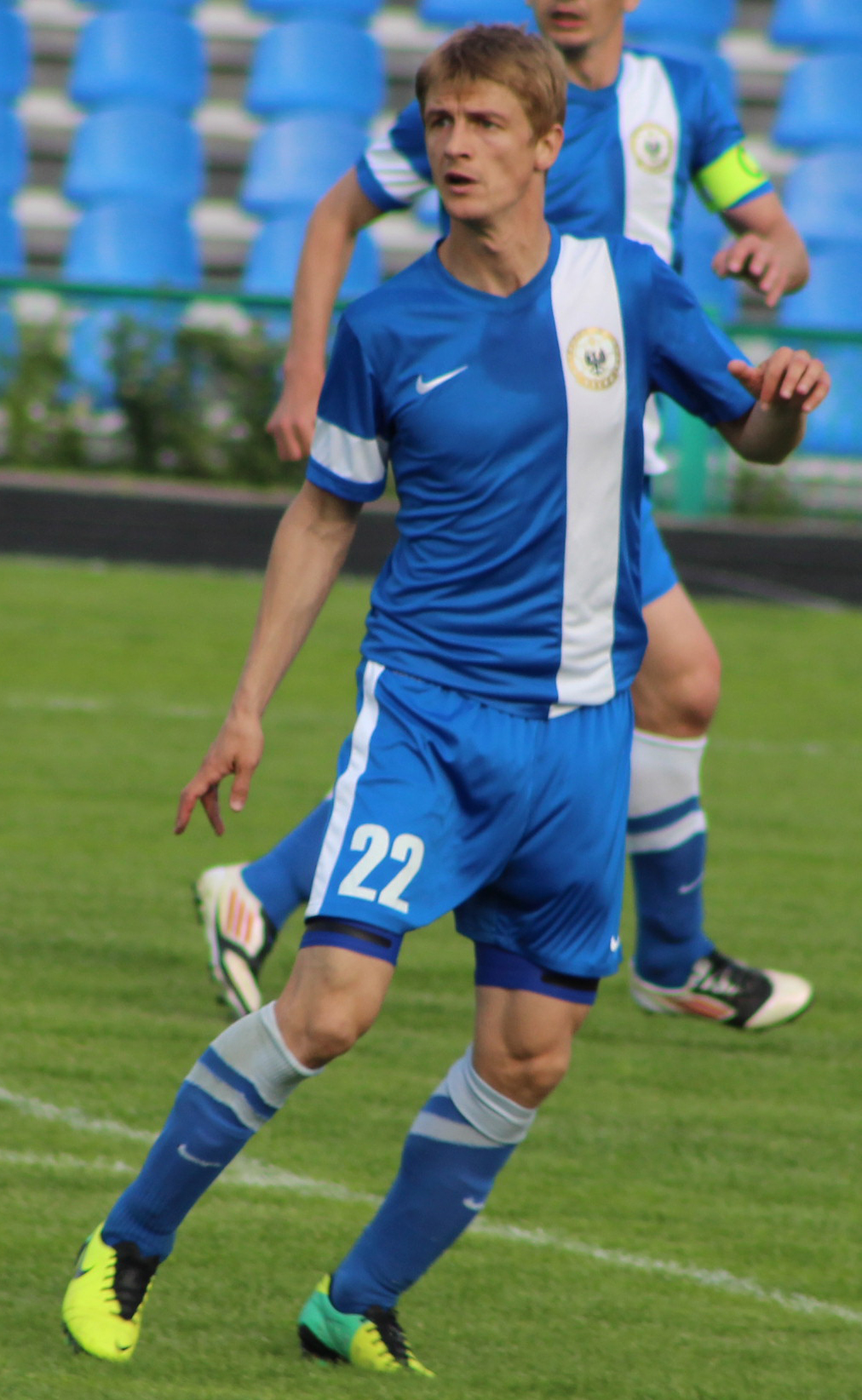
- Kavatsiv in 2014

Personal information
- Full name: Yarema Volodymyrovych Kavatsiv
- Date of birth: 10 February 1986 (age 40)
- Place of birth: Yablunivka, Lviv Oblast, Ukrainian SSR
- Height: 1.81 m (5 ft 11 in)
- Position: Defender

Youth career
- 2000–2003: UFK Lviv

Senior career*
Years	Team	Apps	(Gls)
2003–2005	Rava Rava-Ruska	26	(2)
2005–2007	Metalurh Zaporizhzhia	2	(0)
2005–2007	→ Metalurh-2 Zaporizhzhia	14	(0)
2008–2009	Lviv	11	(0)
2009	Metalurh Donetsk	0	(0)
2009	Banants Yerevan	39	(2)
2009	Illichivets Mariupol	3	(1)
2010	Feniks-Illichovets Kalinine	13	(0)
2011	Lviv	12	(0)
2011	Banants Yerevan	14	(0)
2012–2015	Desna Chernihiv	85	(8)
2015–2016	Zirka Kropyvnytskyi	15	(0)
2016–2017	Veres Rivne	2	(0)
- * Club domestic league appearances and goals

Yarema Kavatsiv (Ukrainian: Ярема Володимирович Каваців; born 10 February 1986) is a Ukrainian former professional footballer who played as a defender.

== Honours ==
Veres Rivne

- Ukrainian First League: 2016–17

Zirka Kropyvnytskyi

- Ukrainian First League: 2015–16

Desna Chernihiv

- Ukrainian Second League: 2012–13

Rava Rava-Ruska

- Ukrainian Second League: 2004–05

Metalurh Zaporizhzhia

- Ukrainian Cup runner-up: 2005–06
