= Dashava =

Rural locality in Lviv Oblast, Ukraine

Dashava Дашава
- Rural settlement
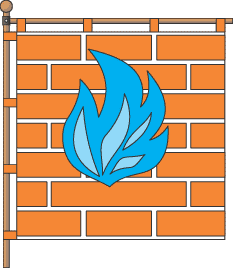
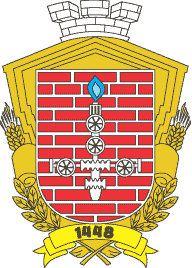
- Flag Coat of arms

- Location in Lviv Oblast Location in Ukraine
- Coordinates: 49°15′35″N 24°00′33″E
- Country: Ukraine
- Oblast: Lviv Oblast
- Raion: Stryi Raion
- Hromada: Stryi urban hromada

Population (2022)
  - Total: 2,343
- Time zone: UTC+2 (EET)
  - Summer (DST): UTC+3 (EEST)

Dashava (Ukrainian: Дашава; Polish: Daszawa) is a rural settlement in Stryi Raion, Lviv Oblast, Ukraine. It is located on the right bank of the Berezhnytsia, a right tributary of the Dniester. Dashava belongs to Stryi urban hromada, one of the hromadas of Ukraine. Its population is 2,343 (2022 estimate).

== History ==
Dashava is known as one of the first historical locations of natural gas production in Europe. In 1926–1929 a gas pipeline with a length of 81 kilimeters connected the settlement with Lviv. Before the Second World War, Stryi was also connected to gas supplies from Dashava. Following the war, in 1946-1948 a pipeline was established between Dashava and Kyiv, and by 1955 gas supplies from Dashava reached Moscow. Later a connection with Minsk and Leningrad was constructed.

Until 26 January 2024, Dashava was designated urban-type settlement. On this day, a new law entered into force which abolished this status, and Dashava became a rural settlement.

== Economy ==
Dashava gas field is located in the area.

=== Transportation ===
The closest railway station, approximately 5 kilometres (3.1 mi) north of the settlement, is in Khodovychi, on the railway line connecting Stryi with Khodoriv. There is infrequent passenger traffic.

Dashava is connected by roads with Stryi, Zhydachiv, and Zhuravne, where it has further access to Lviv, Ternopil, and Uzhhorod.

== Notable people ==
- Stanisław Ożóg, Polish athlete and Olympian
