= OKKO =

Ukrainian gas station network

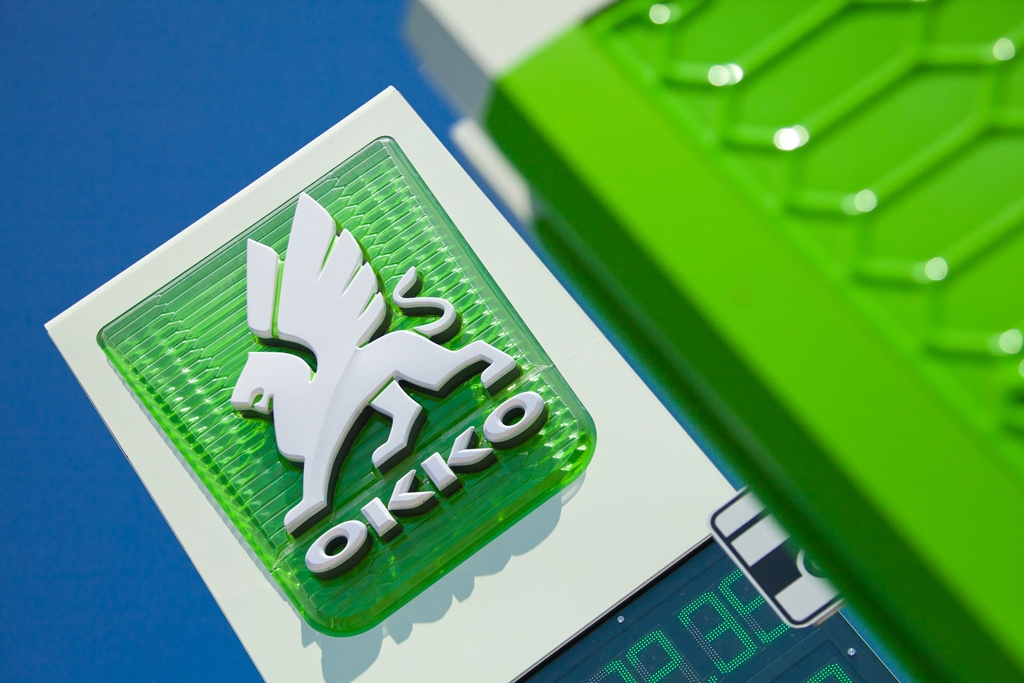
- Type: Private
- Industry: Fuel Retail and network of convenience stores
- Founded: 1999
- Headquarters: Kyiv, Ukraine
- Key people: Vitaliy Antonov
- Website: okko.ua

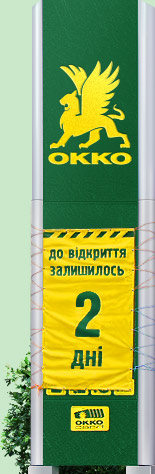
Price board of one of the OKKO's filling stations two days before opening

OKKO (Ukrainian: ОККО) is a network of gas stations in Ukraine. The owner of the OKKO network is open joint-stock company Galnaftogaz.

The first OKKO filling station was opened in Stryi, Lviv Oblast, in 1999. The first large OKKO filling station with a large shop, cafe and portal auto washing began to operate in Lviv in 2000.

As of 2019, the OKKO network consisted of 400 modern filling stations throughout unoccupied Ukraine. The company also has 2 OKKO river filling stations – in Kyiv and Dnipro, and one OKKO compressed natural gas station within the network. The OKKO group has number of own food chains like "A la minute" (fast serving of European cuisine), "Pasta Mia" (Italian cuisine), and "Meiwei" (Pan-Asian cuisine).

== History ==
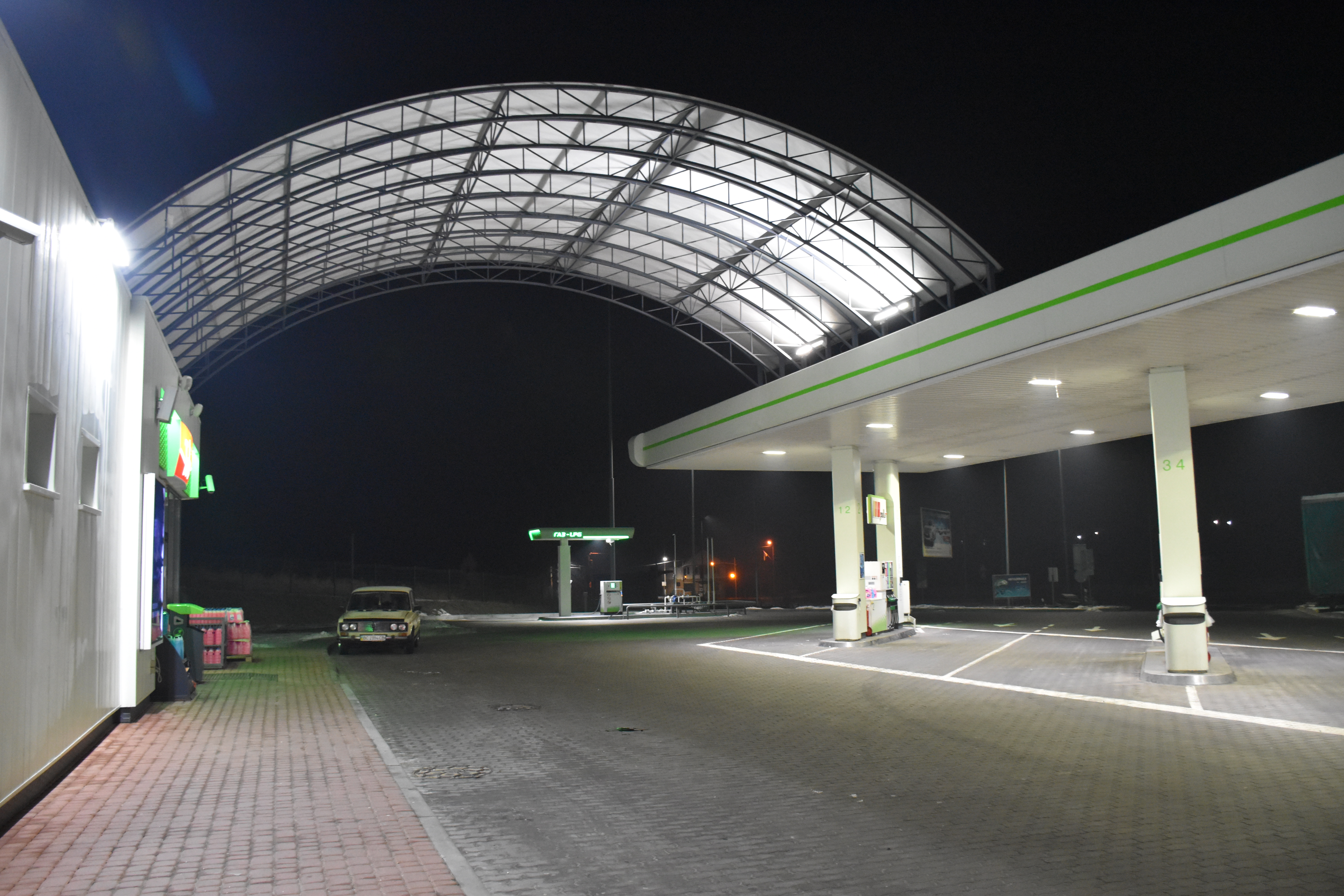
OKKO filling station outside of Lviv

The first OKKO filling station was opened in 1999 in Stryi, Lviv Oblast, and the first large OKKO filling station with a large shop, cafe and portal autowashing began to operate in Lviv in 2000. While the OKKO brand appeared in 1999, it was created based on several smaller oil and gas enterprises in Zakarpattia and Prykarpattia with the first company "Ivano-Frankivsknaftoproduct" established on 31 August 1993. By the late 1990s the control packages of stock in those organizations was obtained by the Financial and Investment Energy Holding (FIEH) uniting them under one brand.

Since 2002, 55 filling station are operating within the OKKO network and the first OKKO branded filling station was opened in the capital city.

In 2006, the first two large OKKO route complexes – in the village of Kalynivka near Kyiv and in Chop in the Zakarpattya region – were opened. The OKKO filling station in Chop entered the Ukrainian book of records as the biggest filling station in Ukraine by area and by amount of services. That same year, the first mobile laboratory for fuel quality control began operating in the network.

In 2007, the first OKKO gas compressor station started operating in Burshtyn, in the Ivano-Frankivsk region. The first A la minute branded fast food restaurant was opened at the OKKO filling station in Skole, Lviv region. The new premium fuel Pulls 95 was launched into the market. The company’s market share increased to 7.1 percent – the third highest in Ukraine.

2008: Concern Galnaftogaz joined Go Green Declaration of UN Global Compact. The principles of ‘green office’ were being introduced in the company. This same year it was decided to implement the principles of Accessibility Program (wheelchair accessibility to retail facilities) in all newly constructed and renovated OKKO filling stations.

2009: FISHKA first national loyalty coalition program was launched. First ‘Tobi’ branded stores were opened at OKKO filling stations in Lviv. OKKO took 9.3 per cent of the retail market of petroleum products in Ukraine. Since 2009, the European Bank for Reconstructions and Development (EBRD) became one of the Company’s shareholders.

2010: The new premium diesel Pulls diesel was launched into the market.

2011: The first Pasta Mia branded Italian restaurant was opened at an OKKO filling station in Donetsk region. The OKKO filling station network is operating in all 24 regions of Ukraine and in Crimea. OKKO’s share of the retail market of petroleum products in Ukraine is 13.6 per cent.

2012: The OKKO filling station network operates with more than 360 filling stations. The company strengthened its position in the eastern and southern regions of Ukraine. It began a major redesign of filling stations. The first device for charging electric vehicles was introduced at an OKKO filling station in Kyiv. Vitaliy Antonov, President of Concern Galnaftogaz, headed the list of top managers Ukrainian companies for the oil industry published by the ‘Top 100’ magazine and was recognized as one of the two top managers in the category ‘Seller and Marketer’.

By 2013, the OKKO filling station network had increased the number of branded filling stations by more than 10 per cent and its market share - to over 15 per cent. The company's plans were to increase its market share by 1-2 per cent and the number of filling stations up to 550 by the end of 2016.

During 2014, the OKKO filling station network opened 13 filling stations and another 19 were reconstructed. 34 charging stations for electric vehicles OKKO Charge were opened at OKKO filling stations. New online processing of OKKO fuel cards maintenance was implemented.

In August 2018 the Security Service of Ukraine searched several offices of the company in Kyiv and Lviv under suspicion of financing pseudo-governments in Eastern Ukraine, the main shareholder of the company Vitalii Antonov denied the accusations stating that the company is not involved in any kind of operations that it is being investigated for and lost 8% of its assets ($80 million) when Donbas and Crimea were occupied by Russia. In May 2019 the company was fined by the Anti-Monopoly Committee of Ukraine for price collusion along with WOG and SOCAR.

In 2022, OKKO experienced a loss of $75 million due to Russian attacks, and 13 gas stations remain in temporarily occupied territories.

Since the start of the full-scale invasion of Ukraine, OKKO has served over 4.6 million portions of coffee or tea and 2.7 million hotdogs for free to Ukrainian soldiers at its gas stations in frontline regions.

On June 30, 2023, cars were filled with water and sand instead of gasoline at the OKKO gas station in Lviv. Most of those who refueled with A-95 gasoline at the OKKO gas station on the way out of Lviv in the direction of Stryi suddenly stopped in the middle of the road after a few kilometers of driving. As reported, cars were filled with low-quality 95% gasoline at the gas station. As a result, at least 20 cars broke down. Car owners had to call tow trucks and the police.

Between 2022 and 2024, OKKO modernized 91 filling stations. During the same period, the company restored 37 filling stations that had been damaged since the beginning of the war in Ukraine.

In 2024, the European Bank for Reconstruction and Development provided €60 million in financing for a biofuels project involving OKKO.

In 2025, Galnaftogaz, which operates the OKKO network, secured €157 million in financing from the European Bank for Reconstruction and Development, the International Finance Corporation, and the Black Sea Trade and Development Bank for the construction of a 147 MW wind farm in Volyn Oblast.

In 2025, OKKO installed 10 additional LPG refueling modules, increasing LPG availability to 365 of the company's 412 operating filling stations in Ukraine.

== Types of branded fuel ==
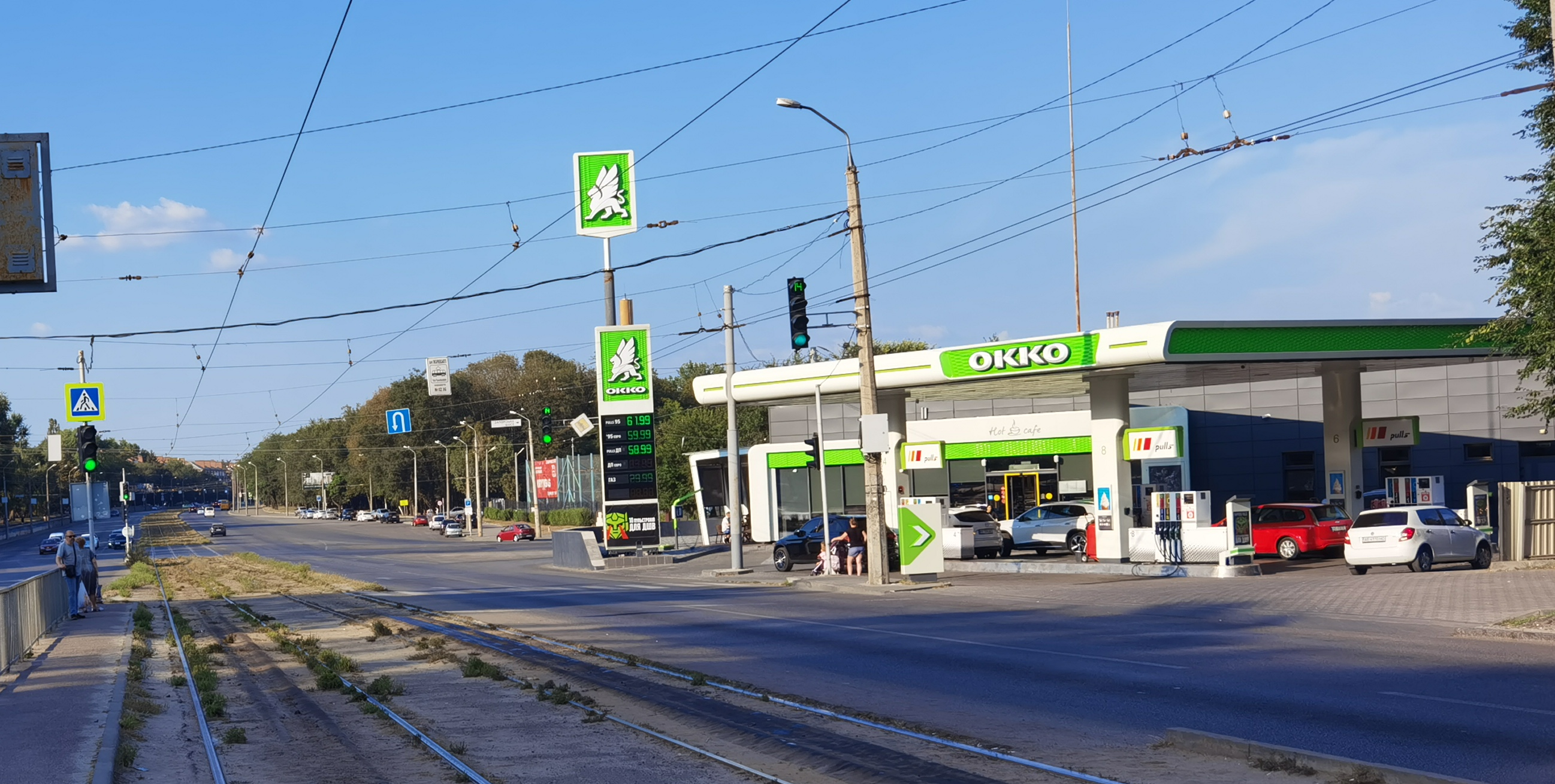
OKKO in Dnipro.

Pulls 95, the new generation fuel, is sold at OKKO filling stations. In autumn 2010, the Company started to supply Pulls Diesel branded diesel fuel, which meets the standards of ISO 4840: 2007 «High quality diesel fuel" and EN 590: 2004 environmental Euro 5.

This fuel originate from:

- ORLEN LIETUVA (Mazeikiai, Lithuania)
- ORLEN (Poland)
- MOZYR OIL REFINERY (Belarus)
- NAFTAN (Belarus)

== Loyalty coalition program ==
Since 2009, OKKO filling station network is using FISHKA loyalty program, the essence of which is that customers accumulate points for purchased goods and services, and can exchange these points for rewards. In 2013 FISHKA loyalty program became national coalition program. Now, FISHKA first national coalition program includes Raiffeisen Bank Aval, the network of Furshet branded supermarkets, the network of Allo and Mobilochka digital stores, Universalna insurance company and Shypshyna online store.

In 2013, a project on co-brand Visa FISHKA cards, exclusive international payment cards of Raiffeisen Bank Aval, was realized. It combines banking payment card and ordinary FISHKA card with contactless payment technology of Visa payWave. In this regard, the Company started installation of bank terminals serving contactless cards of different payment systems at OKKO filling stations.

Overall, at the end of 2013 FISHKA card served over 1,400 outlets throughout Ukraine. The number of registered FISHKA card users increased to 1 985 639.

== Related brands ==
A la minute, Pasta mia, Hot-café. This is the largest network of on the road restaurants that include 32 A la minute, 7 Pasta Mia and almost 400 Hot café branded restaurants. Brand Hot café - is a chain of coffee shops and coffee places at OKKO filling stations.

Tobi. Tobi branded goods stores are operating at OKKO filling stations in "OCC" and also in the cities of Vinnytsia and Lviv region, under this brand some products are produced for OKKO filling station network - drinking water, beverages, energy drinks, ice teas and more.

TFC. TFC fuel quality testing centre includes 8 fixed, 4 district and 3 mobile laboratories performing fuel and lubricants quality control for OKKO filling station network.

== Projects ==
“EYE FOR AN EYE”

2022: On November 1, OKKO, in cooperation with the Come Back Alive Charity, launched the charitable initiative “EYE FOR AN EYE”. The first stage aimed to raise UAH 325 million to purchase 25 SHARK reconnaissance unmanned aerial systems for the Armed Forces of Ukraine. Under the initiative, OKKO allocated UAH 1 from every litre of PULLS 95 and PULLS Diesel fuel sold to the project. Each system included two unmanned aerial vehicles, a launcher, and a specially equipped all-terrain vehicle serving as a mobile control station. The project also provided for the purchase of 25 additional reserve drones and specialized training for military crews.

2025: In January, OKKO and the Come Back Alive Foundation completed the third stage of their joint initiative. Ten units of Ukraine’s Air Assault Forces received ten PULLSTRON reconnaissance and destruction systems worth a total of UAH 500 million.

On June 25, a public art installation titled Awareness was unveiled in Kyiv as part of the “EYE FOR AN EYE” initiative. The artwork is dedicated to the soldiers of Ukraine’s Territorial Defence Forces. The sculptural composition, consisting of two human faces, symbolizes the transformation of Ukrainian society following Russia’s full-scale invasion, from fear and confusion to strength, calmness, and determination.

2026: As part of the “EYE FOR AN EYE: Dronefall” initiative, the company raised UAH 500 million to strengthen Ukraine’s air defence capabilities. In October 2026, the first 80 interceptor drones, worth a total of UAH 13.6 million, were delivered to the Ukrainian military.

== Achievements ==
OKKO filling complex in Chop claims to be the biggest filling complex in Ukraine by area and by the amount of services.

In 2009 OKKO filling station in Inkerman (Crimea) became the largest filling station by area in Ukraine (3.3 hectares). This is due to the fact that the complex, in addition to fuel-distributing columns, has LPG and compressed gas refuelling modules.

== See Also ==
- GORO Mountain Resort
