= Lysiatychi =

Rural locality in Lviv Oblast, Ukraine

Lysiatychi Лисятичі
- Village
- Location within Ukraine Location within Lviv Oblast
- Coordinates: 49°20′05″N 23°57′31″E
- Country: Ukraine
- Oblast: Lviv Oblast
- District: Stryi Raion
- Established: 1443

Area
  - Total: 2,556 km^{2} (987 sq mi)
- Elevation /(average value of): 271 m (889 ft)

Population (2021)
  - Total: ▼1,500
  - Density: 7,007/km^{2} (18,150/sq mi)
- Time zone: UTC+2 (EET)
  - Summer (DST): UTC+3 (EEST)
- Postal code: 82421
- Area code: +380 3245
- Website: село Лисятичі^{(Ukrainian)}

Lysiatychi (Ukrainian: Лися́тичі) is a village (selo) in Stryi Raion, Lviv Oblast in western Ukraine. It belongs to Stryi urban hromada, one of the hromadas of Ukraine. Local government is administered by Lysiatytska village council.

== Geography ==
The village is located along the road from Stryi to Zhydachiv at a distance of 14 kilometres (8.7 mi) from the district center Stryi. It is 63 kilometres (39 mi) from the regional center of Lviv and 16 kilometres (9.9 mi) from the city of Zhydachiv.
The village is large and has an area of 25,56 km^{2} and is currently living in the village of about 1791 persons.

== History ==
The first record of the village dates back to 1443 year. Lysiatychi has been a town, as testified and town hall, and a large Jewish colony. The town had possessed 1,550 acres (630 ha; 2.42 sq mi) arable land in 1785.

== Attractions ==
The village has two churches:

- Church of the Nativity of Christ 1874 (Wooden).
- St. Nicholas Church, located in the former indoors Roman Catholic Church (1903, stone).

== Gallery ==
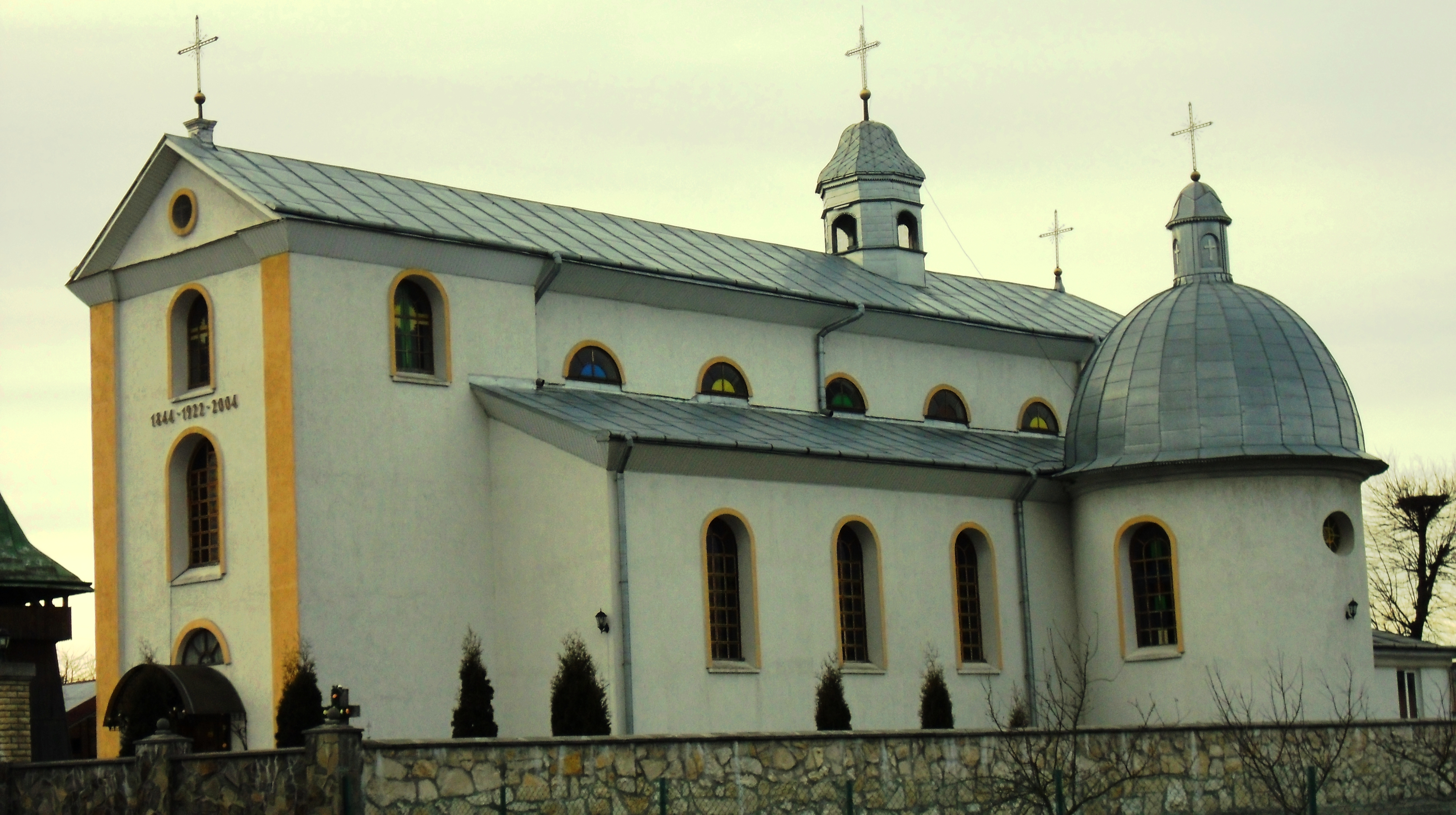
St.Nicolas church in the village Lysiatychi

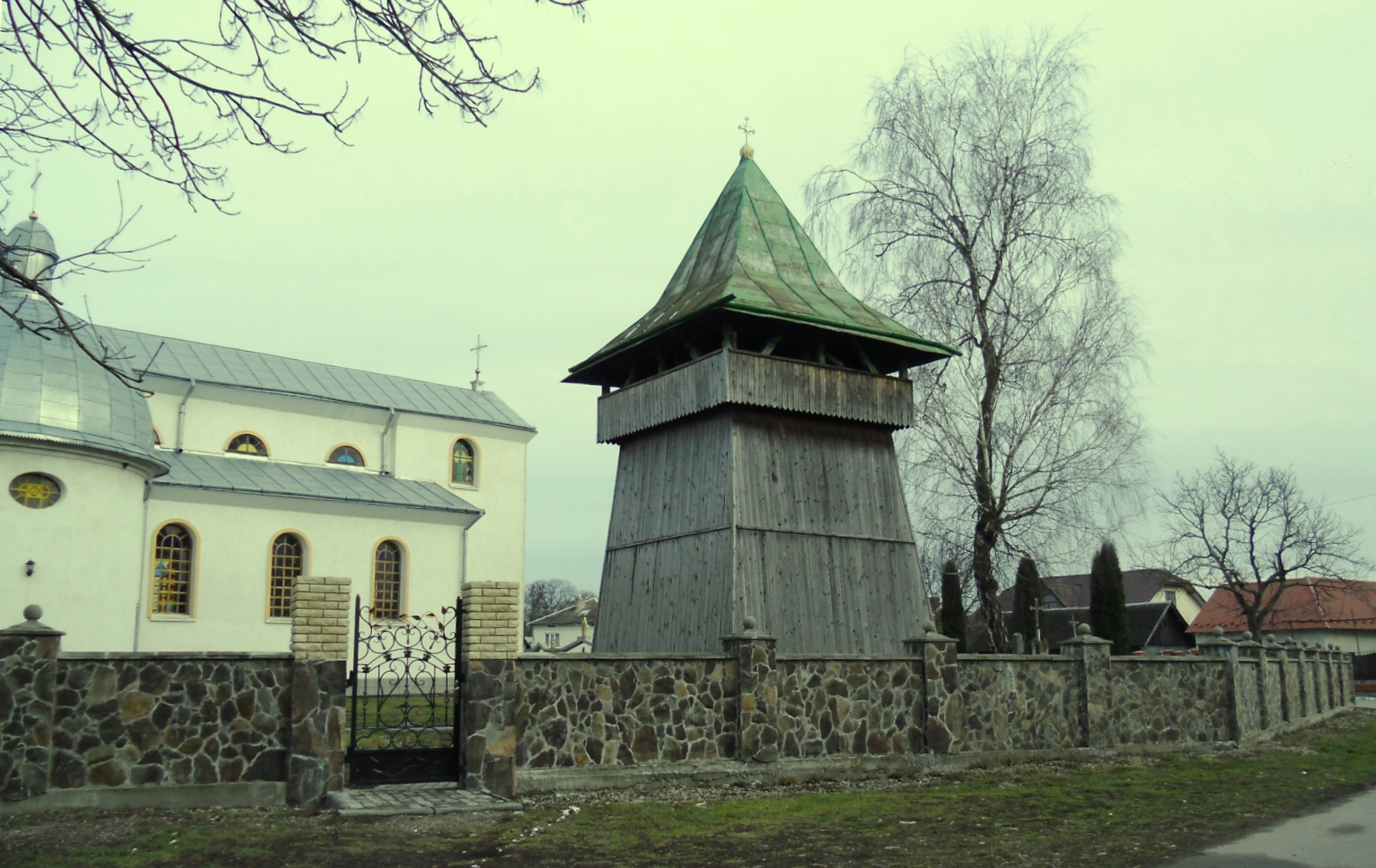
Bell tower of St.Nicolas church in the village Lysiatychi

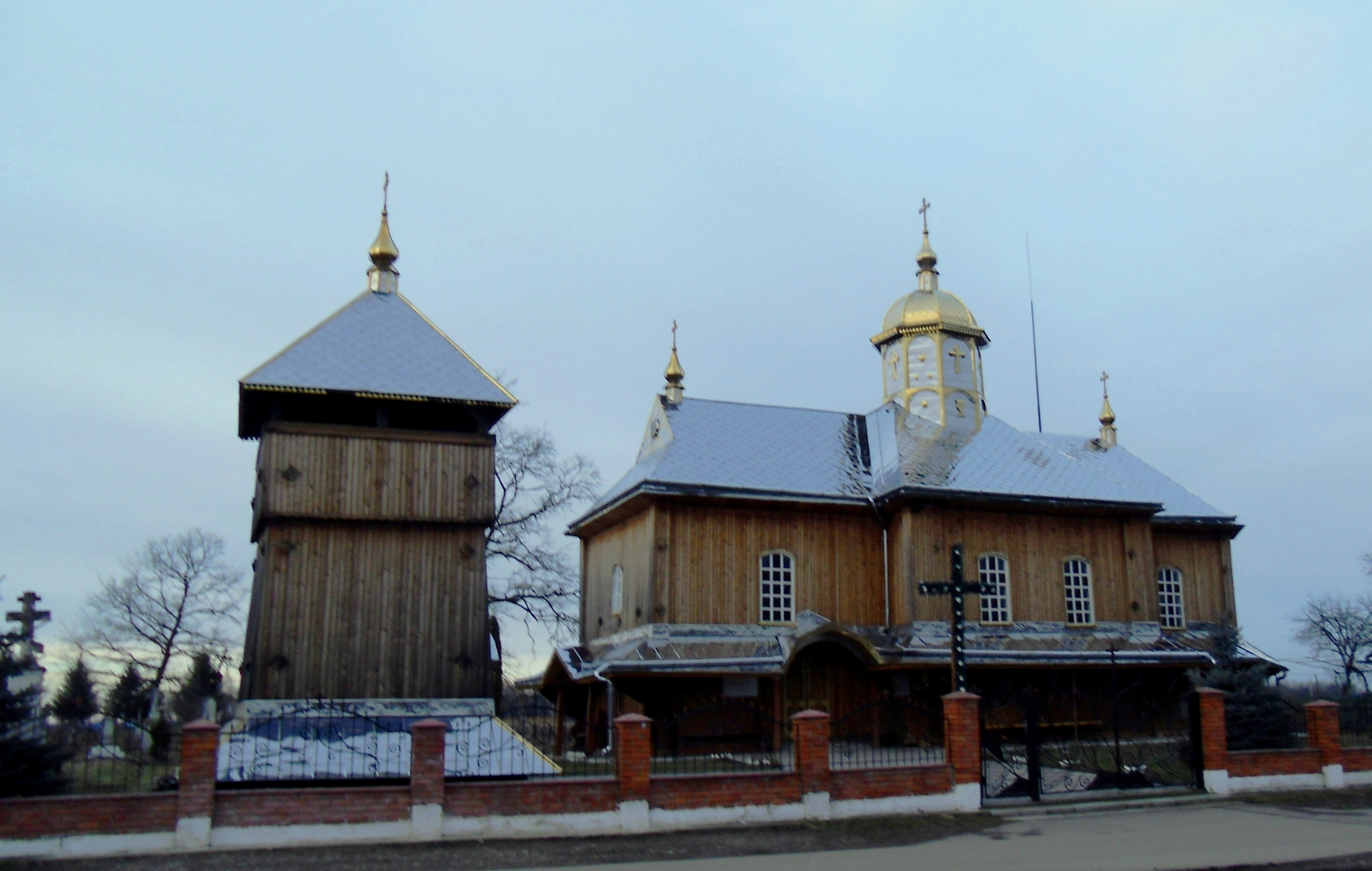
Church and bell tower of the Nativity of Christ church

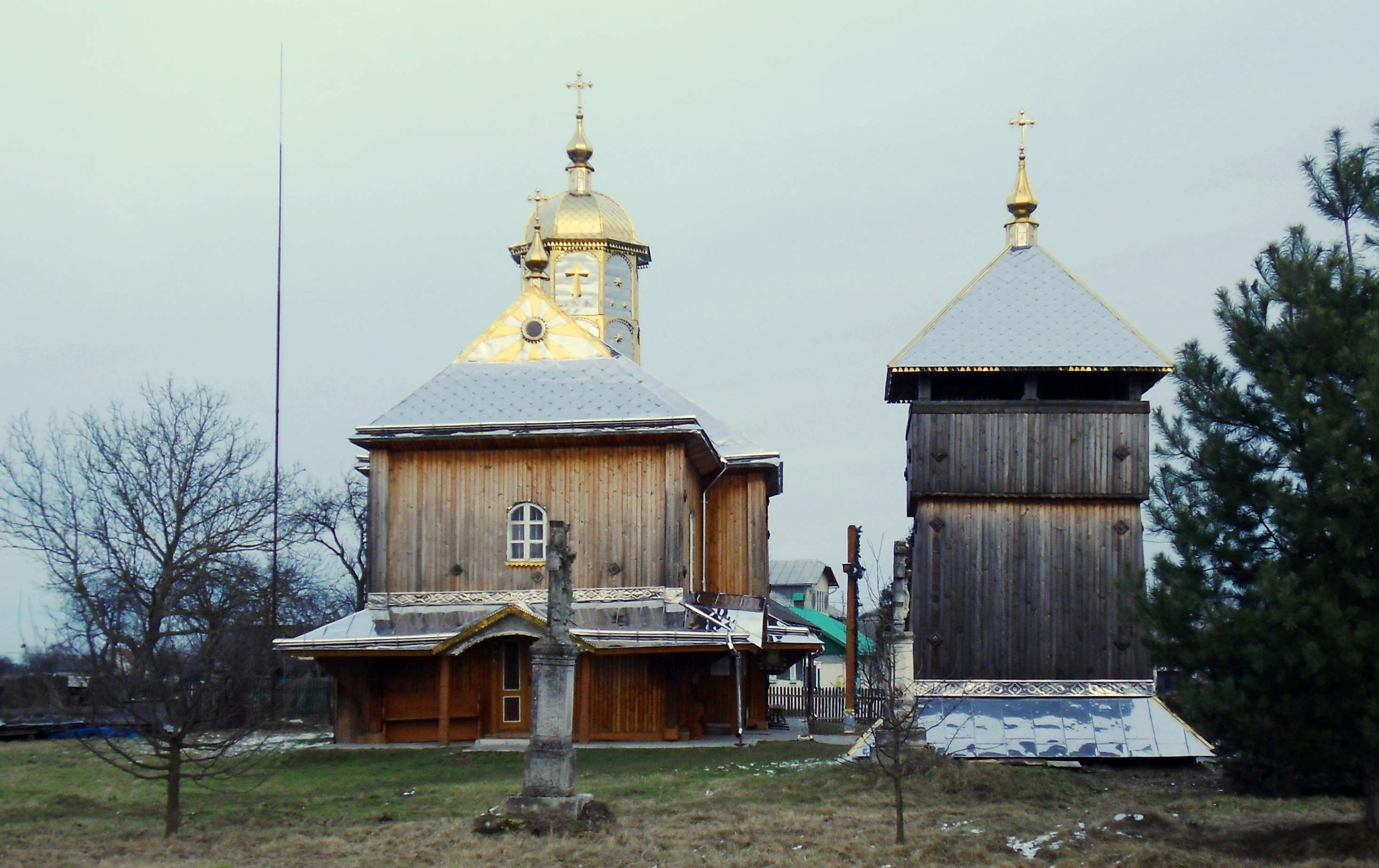
Church and bell tower of the Nativity of Christ church 1874 (wooden).

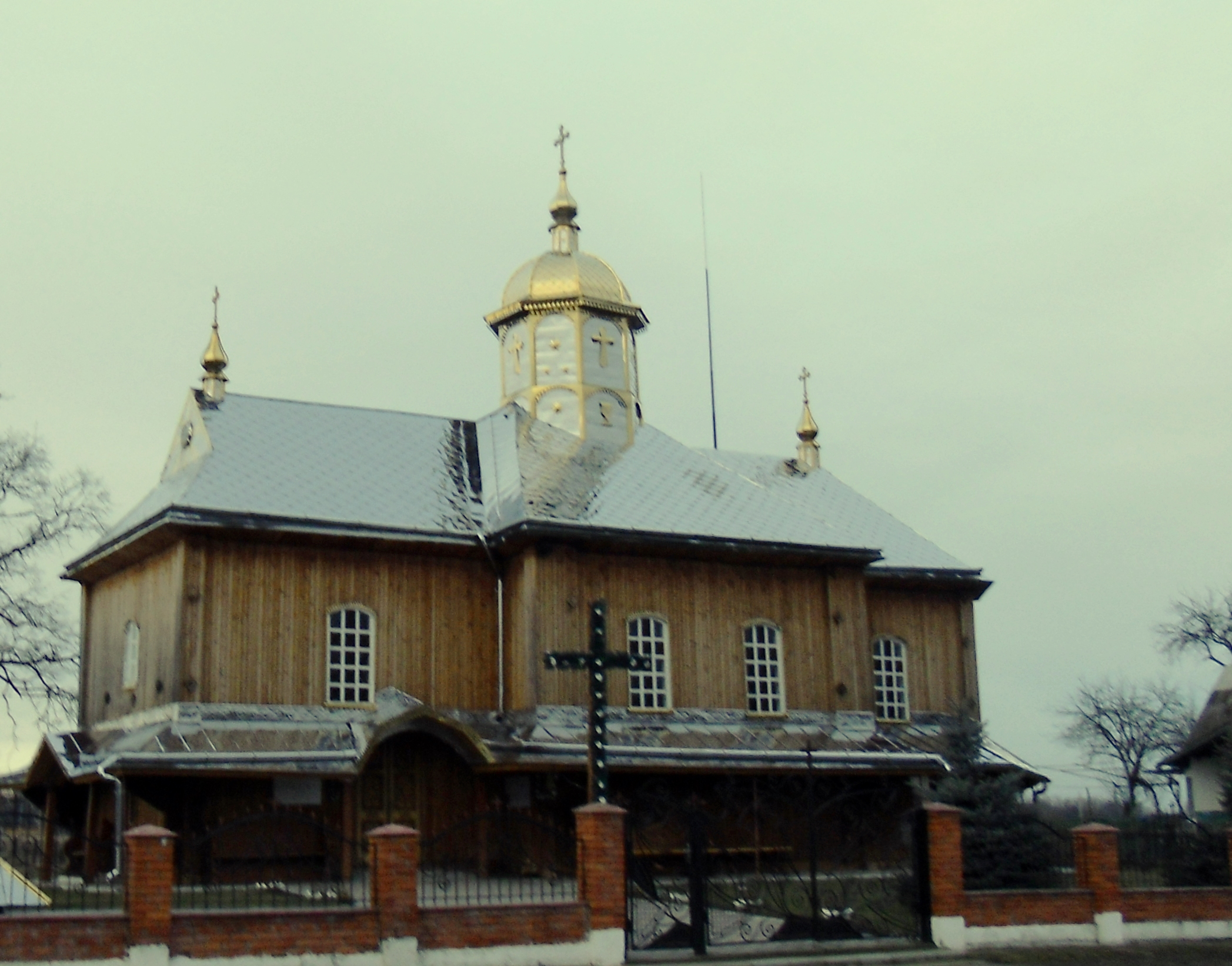
Church of the Nativity of Christ

== Famous people ==
Ivan Franko visited the village Lysiatychi and has written about it in his poem "Rusyn traveling with Trouble" (Vandrivka Rusyna z Bidoyu).

== Literature ==
- Ukrainian: Історія міст і сіл УРСР : Львівська область. – К. : ГРУРЕ, 1968 р. Page 835
