= Holobutiv =

Rural locality in Lviv Oblast, Ukraine

Holobutiv Голобутів
- Village
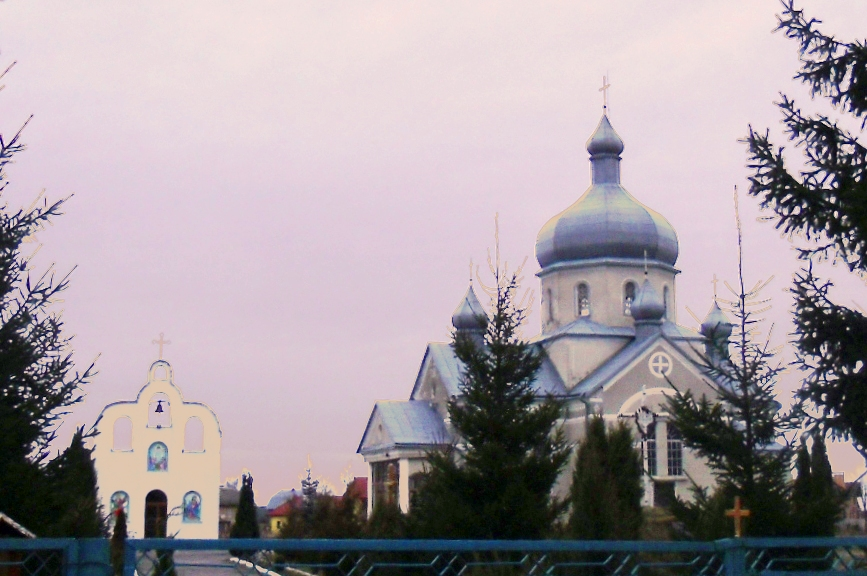
- Church Ascension of the Lord. Holobutiv

- Location within Lviv Oblast
- Coordinates: 49°15′36″N 23°44′14″E
- Country: Ukraine
- Oblast: Lviv Oblast
- District: Stryi Raion
- Established: 1664

Area
  - Total: 1,768 km^{2} (683 sq mi)
- Elevation /(average value of): 305 m (1,001 ft)

Population
  - Total: ▼921
  - Density: 53/km^{2} (140/sq mi)
- Time zone: UTC+2 (EET)
  - Summer (DST): UTC+3 (EEST)
- Postal code: 82433
- Area code: +380 3245
- Website: село Голобутів ^{(Ukrainian)}

Holobutiv (Ukrainian: Голобу́тів) – village (selo) is located in Stryi Raion, Lviv Oblast, of Western Ukraine. It belongs to Stryi urban hromada, one of the hromadas of Ukraine. The population of the village is 921, and the local government is administered by the Holobutivska village council.
The village is located to the side of the Stryi Road and Drohobych at a distance 10 kilometres (6.2 mi) from the district center Stryi, 80 kilometres (50 mi) from the regional center Lviv and 25 kilometres (16 mi) from Drohobych.
The first record of the village dates back to the year 1664.
