= Dashava gas field =

Gas field in Subcarpathian Voivodeship, Poland

Dashava
- Country: Ukraine
- Region: Lviv Oblast
- Location: Dashava
- Offshore/onshore: onshore
- Operator: Ukrgasvydobuvannya

Field history
- Discovery: 1921

Production
- Estimated gas in place: 2×10^{9} m^{3} 72×10^{9} cu ft

The Dashava gas field in Ukraine was discovered in 1921, when that area belonged to the Second Polish Republic. It produces natural gas. The total proven reserves of the Dashava gas field are around 72 billion cubic feet (2 billion m^{3}).

== History ==
Discovered in 1921, at the time the Dashava gas field was estimated to be the biggest of its type in Europe. Between 1926 and 1929 a gas pipeline was built, connecting the field with Lviv. In 1946-1948 another pipeline, the largest ion the continent, was constructed in order to supply local gas to Kyiv; in 1951 that pipeline was expanded to Moscow, allowing to start supplies of gas from Ukraine to Russia.

In modern days, an underground natural gas storage functions in Dashava.
