= Uhersko, Ukraine =

Rural locality in Lviv Oblast, Ukraine

Uhersko Угерсько
- Village
- Location within Lviv Oblast Location within Ukraine
- Coordinates: 49°18′03″N 23°54′31″E
- Country: Ukraine
- Oblast: Lviv
- District: Stryi
- Established: 1176

Area
  - Total: 12.39 km^{2} (4.78 sq mi)
- Elevation /(average value of): 283 m (928 ft)

Population
  - Total: 1,683
  - Density: 135.8/km^{2} (351.8/sq mi)
- Time zone: UTC+2 (EET)
  - Summer (DST): UTC+3 (EEST)
- Postal code: 82424
- Area code: +380 3245
- Website: село Угерсько ^{(Ukrainian)}

Uhersko (Ukrainian: Уге́рсько), in 1946–1993 Yablunivka (Ukrainian: Яблунівка) is a village (selo) in Stryi Raion, Lviv Oblast, of Western Ukraine.

== Geography ==
Uhersko lies 65 kilometres (40 mi) from the city of Lviv and 8 kilometres (5 mi) from Stryi. It belongs to Stryi urban hromada, one of the hromadas of Ukraine. The village is located near the Highway M06 and is along the Stryi River. The village Uhersko covers an area of 12.39 square kilometres (4.78 sq mi).

== History ==
The first record for archival documents about the village Uhersko refers to 1176. The document mentions that Uhersko existed in Ancient Russ State. The name of villages has changed from the initial Uhryny on Uhersko, Yablunivka and again Uhersko.

== Economy ==
In territory of village there are a number of industrial enterprises – distillery (1911); feed mill (1972); bakery (1967).
