= Stryi urban hromada =

Urban hromada in Lviv Oblast, Ukraine

Stryi urban hromada Стрийська міська громада
- Hromada
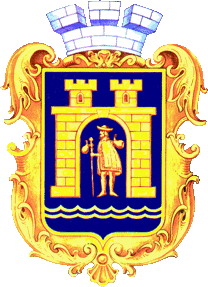
- Seal
- Interactive map of Stryi urban hromada
- Coordinates: 49°15′22″N 23°51′1″E
- Country: Ukraine
- Oblast: Lviv Oblast
- Raion: Stryi Raion
- Admin. center: Stryi

Area
  - Total: 551.1 km^{2} (212.8 sq mi)

Population (2022)
  - Total: 98,376
  - Density: 178.5/km^{2} (462.3/sq mi)
- CATOTTG code: UA46100230000047305
- Settlements: 47
- Cities: 1
- Rural settlements: 1
- Villages: 45

Stryi urban territorial hromada (Ukrainian: Стрийська міська територіальна громада, romanized: Stryiska miska terytorialna hromada) is an urban hromada (municipality) of Ukraine, located in the western Lviv Oblast. Its administrative centre is the city of Stryi.

Stryi urban hromada has a total area of 551.1 square kilometres (212.8 mi^{2}). Its population is 98,378 (2022 estimate).

Until 18 July 2020, Stryi was incorporated as a city of oblast significance and served as the administrative center of Stryi Raion even though it did not belong to the raion. In July 2020, as part of the administrative reform of Ukraine, which reduced the number of raions of Lviv Oblast to seven, the city of Stryi was merged into Stryi Raion.

== Settlements ==
In addition to one city (Stryi) and one urban-type settlement (Dashava), Stryi urban hromada includes 45 villages:

- Berezhnytsia
- Bratkivtsi
- Velyki Didushychi
- Verchany
- Vivnia
- Haiduchyna
- Holobutiv
- Dibrova
- Dobrivliany
- Dobriany
- Zhulyn
- Zavadiv
- Zahirne
- Zaplatyn
- Zarichne
- Iosypovychi
- Kavske
- Komariv
- Kuty
- Lany-Sokolivski
- Lanivka
- Lysiatychi
- Lotatnyky
- Luh
- Mali Didushychi
- Myrtiuky
- Nezhukhiv
- Oleksychi
- Pidhirtsi
- Pishchany
- Podorozhnie
- Pukenychi
- Piatnychany
- Railiv
- Rozhirche
- Semyhyniv
- Sykhiv
- Slobidka
- Stryhantsi
- Strilkiv
- Uhersko
- Uhilnia
- Khodovychi
- Shchaslyve
- Yarushychi
