= Vitaliy Antonov =

Ukrainian businessman (born 1962)

- Антонов Віталій Борисович
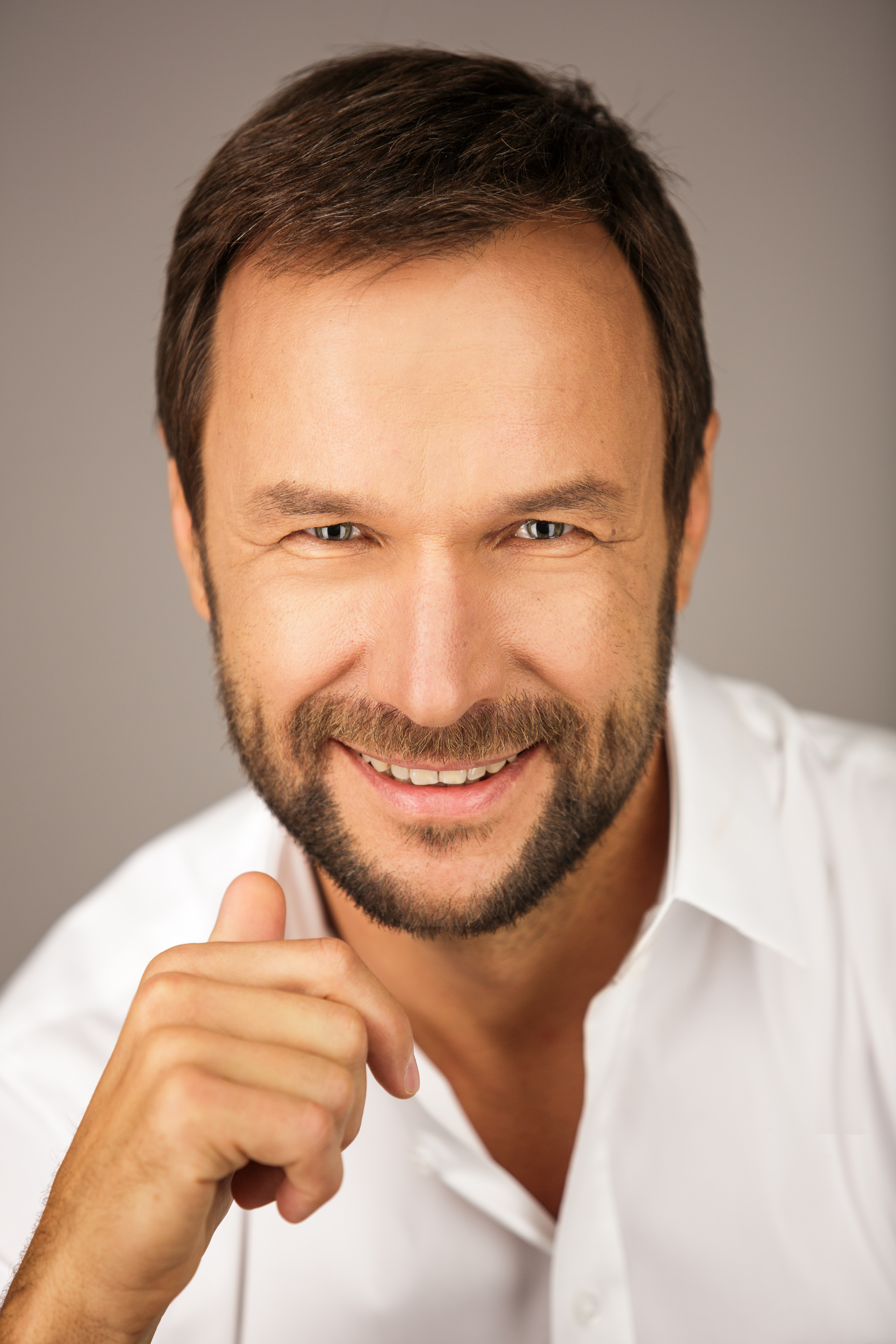
- Born: 12 December 1962 (age 63); Stryi, Lviv Oblast, Ukraine
- Education: Ternopil National Economic University (Ph.D.)
- Occupation: Businessperson
- Awards: State Order of Ukraine “For Merit” III Degree
- Website: www.okko.ua

Vitaliy Borysovyvch Antonov (born 12 December 1962 in Stryi, Lviv Oblast) is a private investor from Ukraine who actively invests in various sectors of the economy around the world. He is the founder of the international investment company Universe Investment Group, which includes OKKO Group. PhD in Economics. Resides in Switzerland.

== Education ==
Antonov studied at Stryi School Number 4 from 1970 to 1978. In 1988 he graduated from Ternopil National Economic University with honors with a specialization in Finance and Credit. He defended a dissertation on the topic "Activation of the Attraction of Foreign Direct investment into Ukraine's Economy in the Condition of Global Competition' and received a scientific degree, a Ph.D. in economics in 2011.

== Career ==
Since school, Antonov has been fond of rock climbing and then of mountaineering, so after graduation, his first jobs were related to these hobbies.

In 1988-1990, he headed a climbing and tourist club in his hometown, and in 1990-1992 he worked as the head of Lviv Regional Rescue Service of the Red Cross Society in Stryi.

In 1992, Antonov started his own business. He founded businesses in the fields of petroleum products trading (Concern Galnaftogaz), food production (Concern Khlibprom), insurance (Universalna Insurance Company), banking services (Universal Bank), and commercial and residential real estate construction (Vash Dim, Technopark), which later became leaders in their respective industries. As a businessman, he has been repeatedly awarded and recognized as one of the best top managers in Ukraine, being among the hundred most influential people in the country who played a key role in the development of Ukraine.

Since 2012, he has been living in Switzerland, working on the creation of an international investment group with a diversified portfolio of investments. Today, the international investment group founded by Antonov actively invests in various countries and sectors of the economy. The group's portfolio includes investments in high-tech and innovative industries in Singapore and the United States, mining projects in Canada, Australia and South Africa, development projects in the UAE, real estate in Switzerland, Cyprus, Spain and Italy, international resource trading, and venture capital businesses. The group reinvests its profits in the development of alternative energy and agricultural sectors and a ski resort in Ukraine.

== Scandals ==
On 1 November 2018 Russian sanctions were imposed against 322 citizens of Ukraine, including Antonov.

On 21 August 2018, in the premises of the Lviv and Kyiv offices of PJSC Concern Galnaftogaz (OKKO filling station network), officers of the Security Service of Ukraine conducted searches with the seizure of documents and equipment. According to Antonov, he and his company are "accused of financing actions taken to overthrow the constitutional order and change Ukraine's state borders," including financing separatism in Eastern Ukraine. In addition, the SSU suspects the OKKO gas station network of operating in the Crimea.

On 25 October 2018, in connection with the lack of corpus delicti, criminal proceedings that had been opened in May 2018 by the Security Service of Ukraine on the grounds of a criminal offense under Part 3 of Art. 110-2 of the Criminal code of Ukraine were closed by the decision of the prosecutor of the General prosecutor's office of Ukraine based on paragraph 2 of part 1 of Art. 284 of the Criminal Procedure Code of Ukraine.

== Other activities ==
Since 1999 Antonov has been the Honorary Consul of the Republic of Lithuania in Lviv and Lviv Oblast, and since 2007 - the Honorary General Consul of the Republic of Lithuania in Lviv. In 2021, Antonov submitted his credentials.

He has been the head of the Taras Shevchenko Ukrainian-Lithuanian Fund in 2001-2021. In 2021, Antonov submitted his credentials.

Antonov became one of the founders of the Lviv Business School of the Ukrainian Catholic University in 2008.

He was a member of the Council of Investors under the Cabinet of Ministers of Ukraine in 2009–2010.

In 2016, Antonov was elected a member of the supervisory board of Ivan Franko Lviv National University.

In 2019-2020 he headed the newly established Committee on Strategic Initiatives, Investment and Tax Policy from the Federation of Employers of Ukraine.

== Family status ==
Single, has six children.

Lives in the сanton of Vaud, Switzerland.
