= Stryi =

City in Lviv Oblast, Ukraine

Stryi Стрий
- City
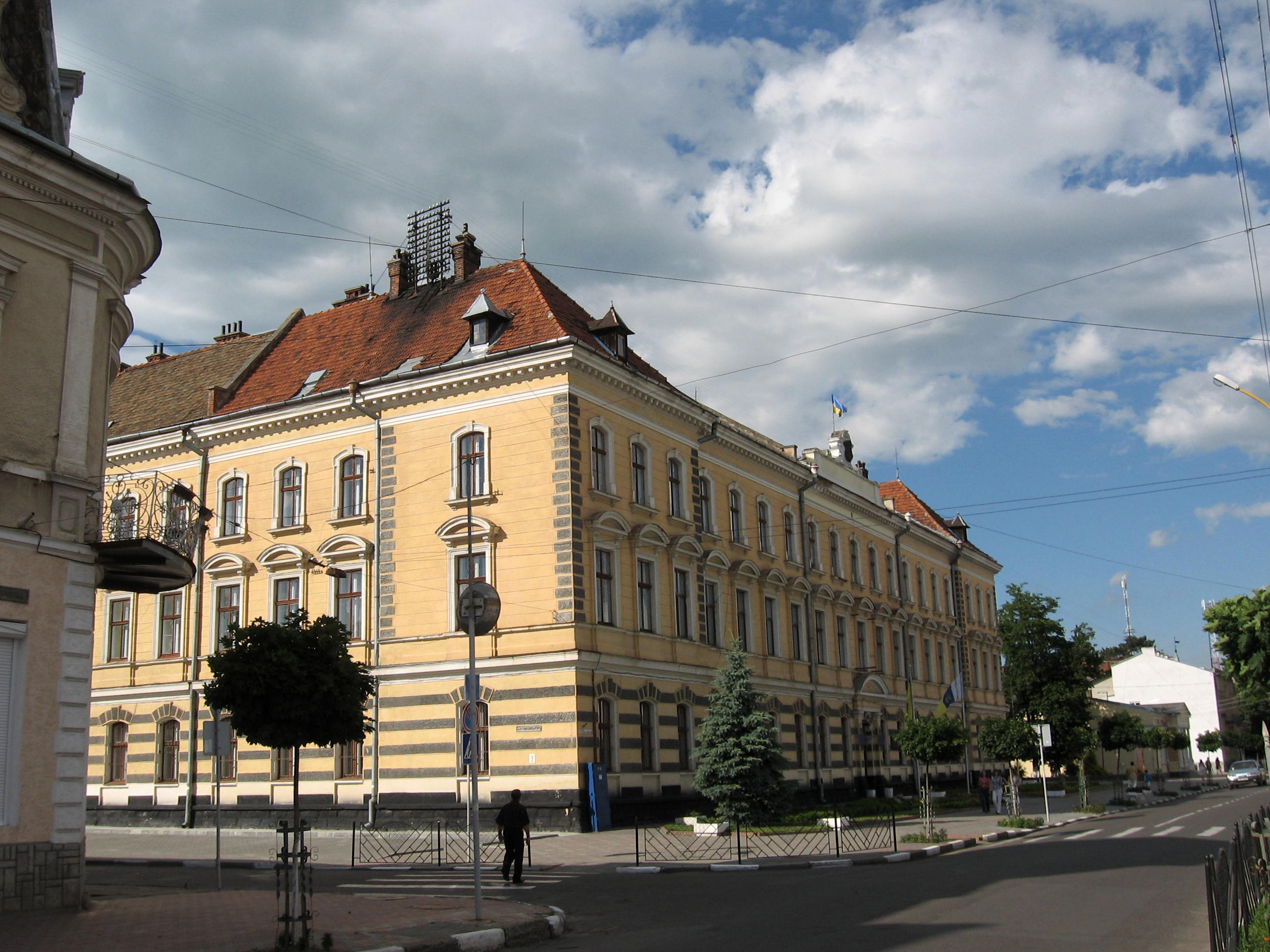
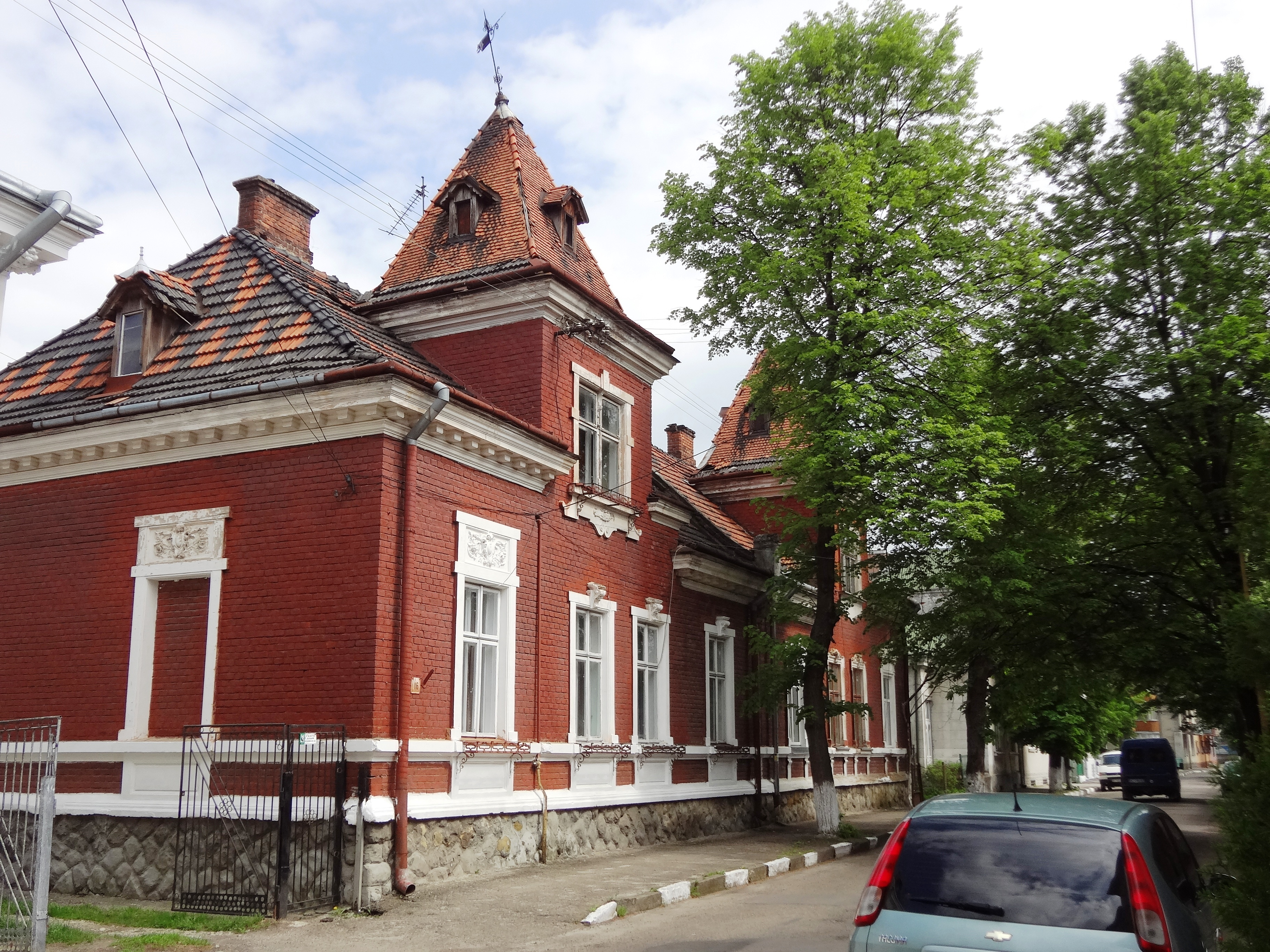
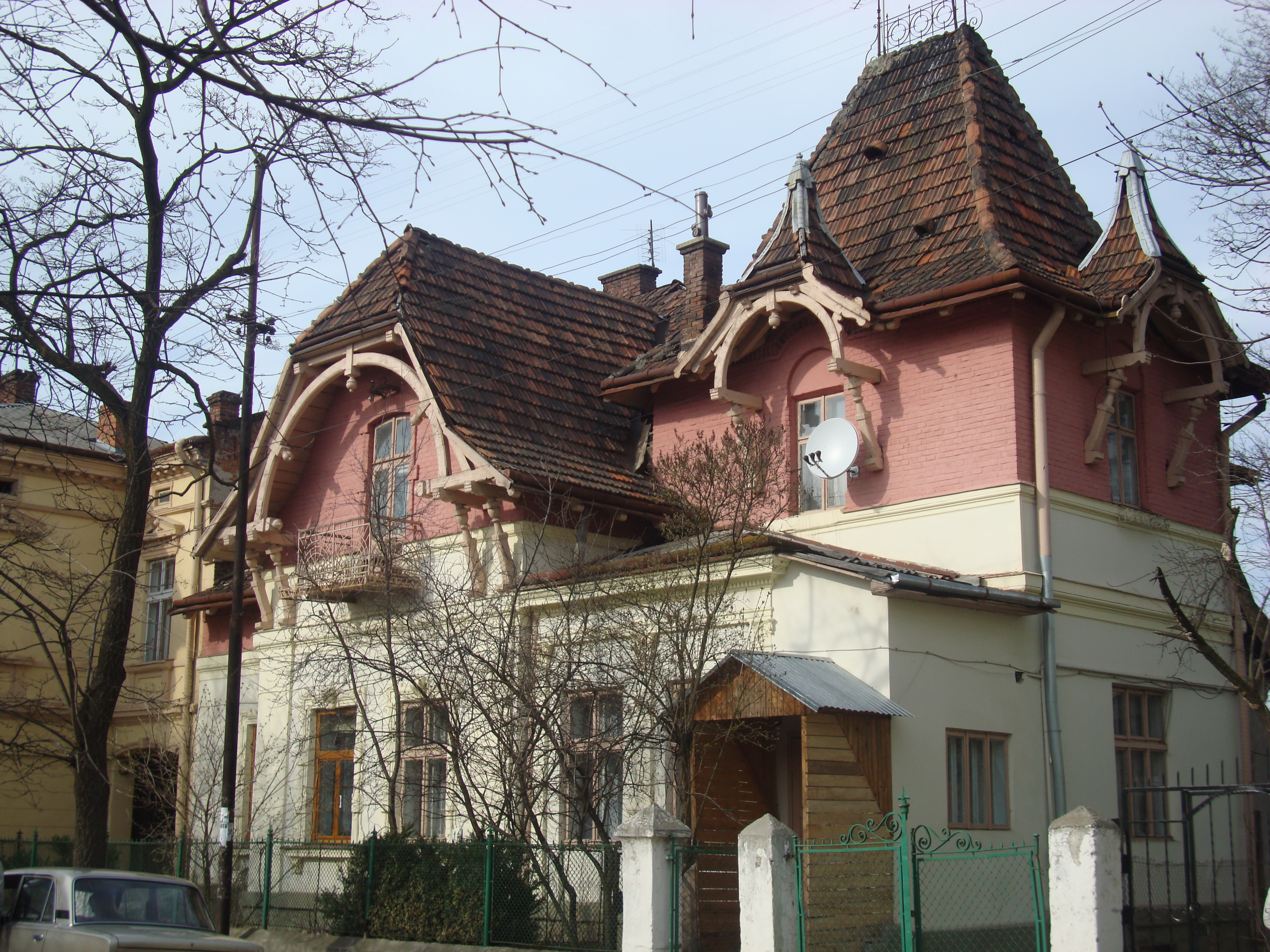
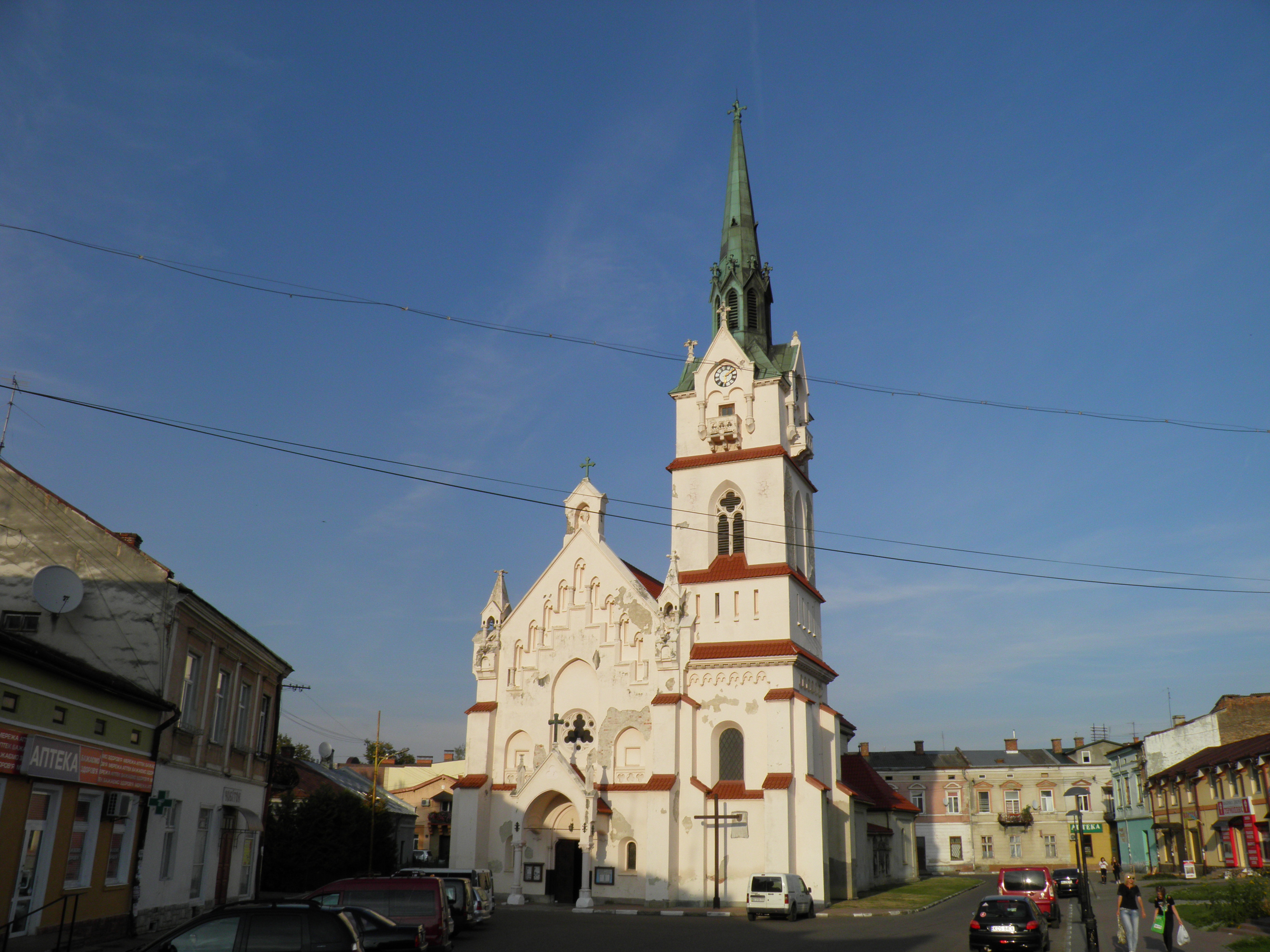
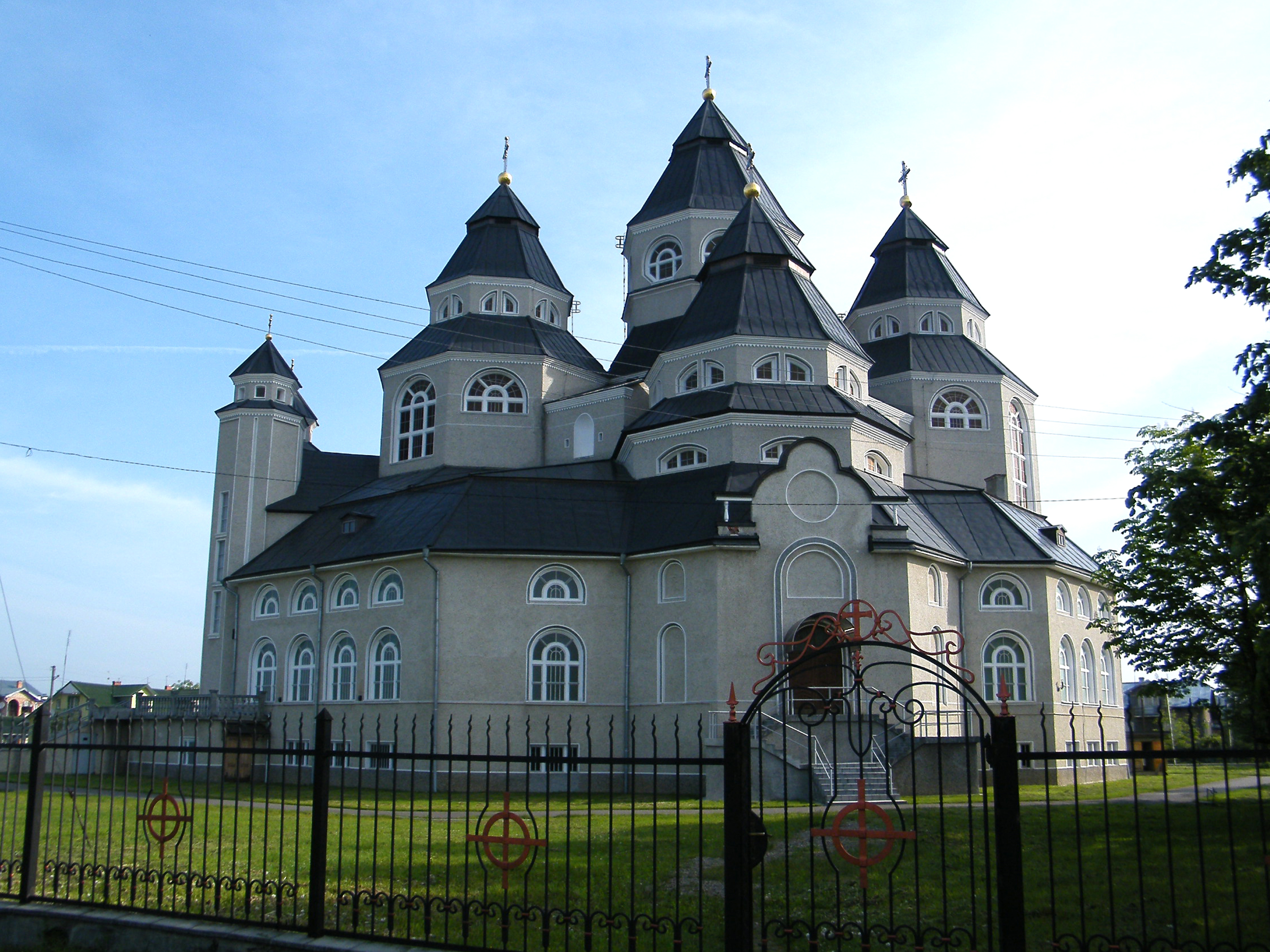
- Left to right, from top: Stryi City Hall; Historical villas; Church of the Nativity of Virgin Mary; Church of Sts. Peter and Paul.

- Flag Coat of arms
- Motto: Semper fidelis
- Location within Lviv Oblast Location within Ukraine
- Coordinates: 49°15′22″N 23°51′1″E
- Country: Ukraine
- Oblast: Lviv Oblast
- Raion: Stryi Raion
- Hromada: Stryi urban hromada
- Founded: 13th century
- Magdeburg law: 1431

Government
  - Mayor: Oleg Kanivets

Area
  - Total: 16.95 km^{2} (6.54 sq mi)
- Elevation: 296 m (971 ft)

Population (2022)
  - Total: 59,425
  - Estimate (August 2024): 67,095
  - Density: 3,506/km^{2} (9,080/sq mi)
- Time zone: UTC+2 (EET)
  - Summer (DST): UTC+3 (EEST)
- Postal code: 82400
- Area code: +380-3245
- Licence plate: BC (before 2004: ТА,ТВ,ТН,ТС)
- Website: http://stryi-rada.gov.ua/index.php

Stryi (Ukrainian: Стрий, IPA: [strɪj]; Polish: Stryj) is a city in Lviv Oblast, western Ukraine. It is located in the left bank of the Stryi River, approximately 65 kilometres (40 mi) south of Lviv in the foothills of the Carpathian Mountains. It serves as the administrative center of Stryi Raion within the oblast. Stryi also hosts the administration of Stryi urban hromada, one of the hromadas of Ukraine. Its population is approximately 59,425 (2022 estimate).

== Name ==
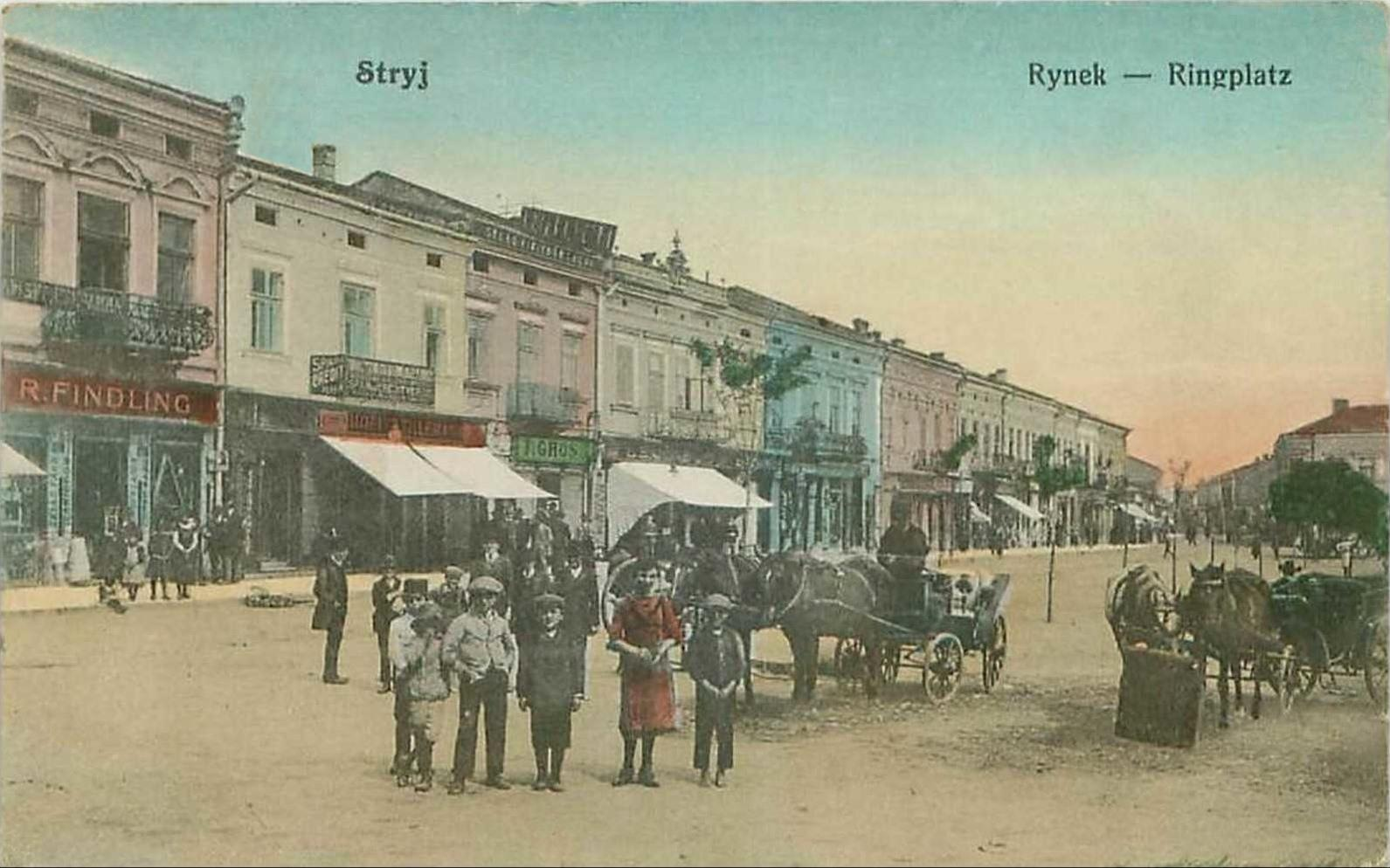
Stryj postcard, 1915

The city takes its name from that of the river Stryi, a tributary of the Dniester.

The river's name is very old and means "stream". Its etymology stems from the Indo-European root *sreu. (Note: Other words with the same root are found in modern Ukrainian (струм, струя), Polish (struga, strumień), Irish Celtic (sruami), German (Strom, "large river"), Persian (struth, "river"), Sanskrit स्रवति sravati ("to flow"), Latvian (straume), Lithuanian (sriatas, strautas, "stream", "a thing that flows"), and other languages. The word is possibly related to the Styr, Ossetian for "big", and there is also a Styr River in Ukraine.) The area was inhabited by the White Croats and it has been established that name Horvat (Croat) is likewise of Iranian (Sarmatian) origin.

In different times the name was written differently, and in various old documents we can find such names: Stryg, Stry, Stryj, Stryjn, Stryjia, Strig, Strigenses, Stryi, Strey, Striig, Strya, Sthryensis, Sthrya, Stryei, and Stri. The inhabitants take pride in the fact that the city has managed to keep its original name over time.

== History ==
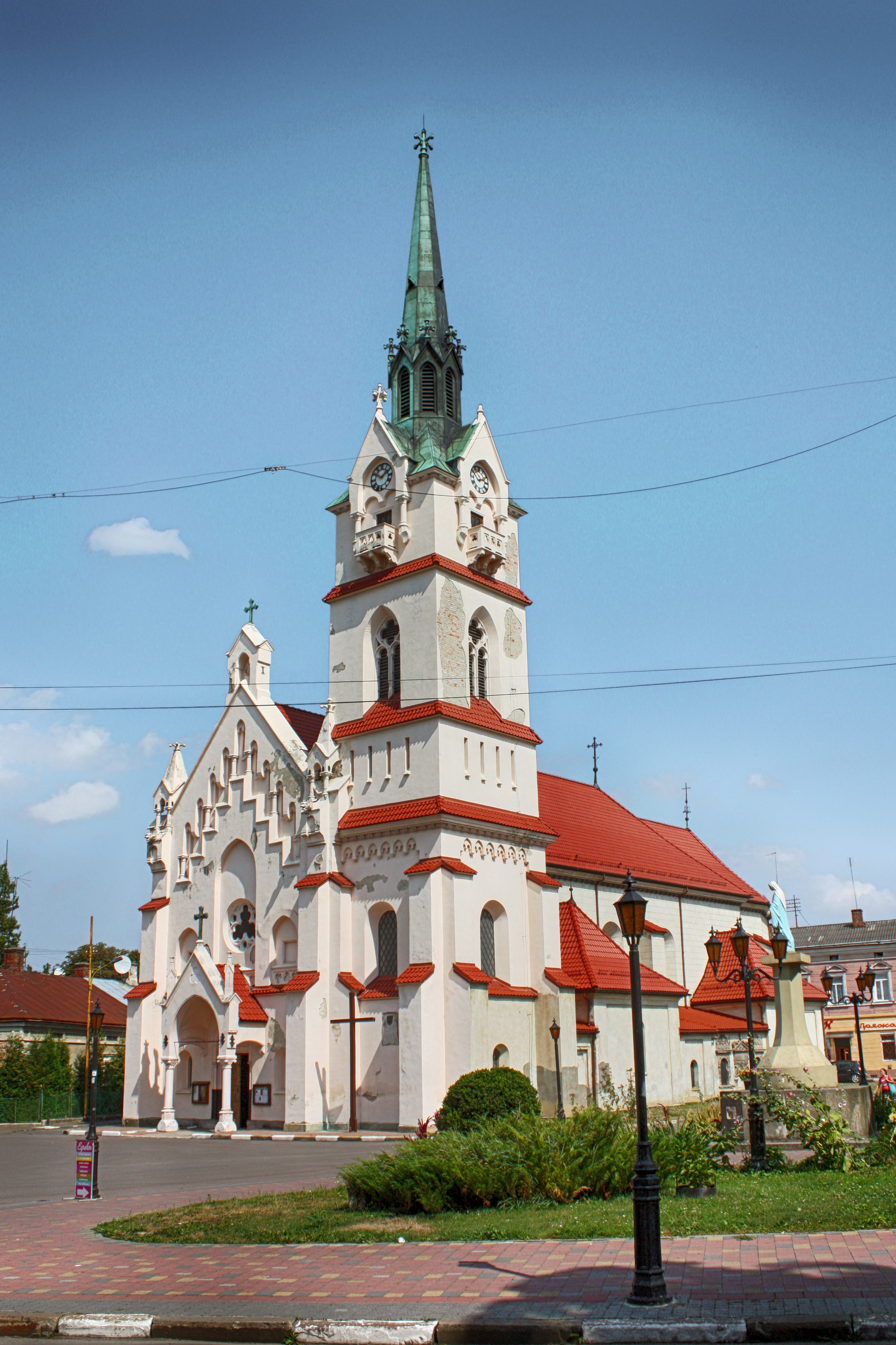
Church of Our Lady Protectress

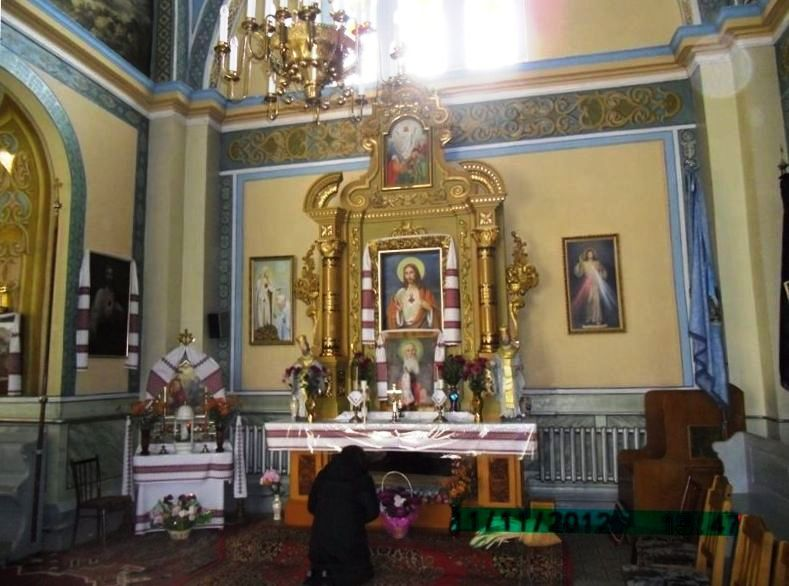
Relics of the blessed Josaphat Kotsylovsky

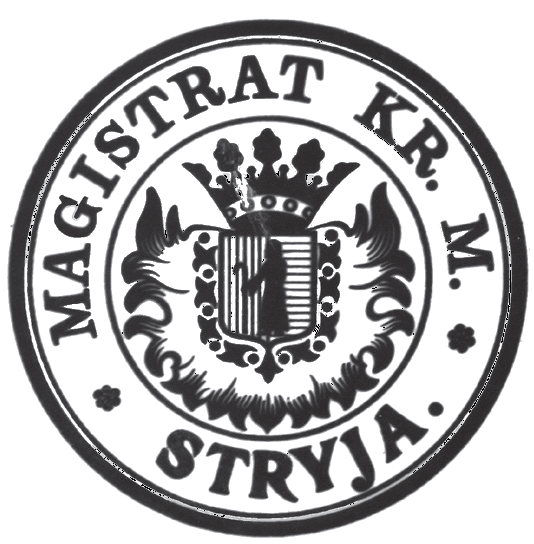
Magistrate of the Royal city of Stryi

Stryi was mentioned for the first time in 1385 (see: Red Ruthenia). Its territory was annexed to Poland following their invasion and conquest of Galicia. In 1387 the Polish king Jogaila gave the city as the present to his brother Švitrigaila. In 1431 it was given the Magdeburg Rights, and it was located in the Ruthenian Voivodeship, which from the conquest in the 14th century until 1772 was a part of Poland. The city was governed by the local magistrate headed by a burgomaster. Following the Partitions of Poland the territory and all Galicia fell to the Austrian Empire.

Its geographical location had a positive influence on its development and growth. The city became a flourishing trade center being located on the major trade route between Halych and Lviv and especially during the 15th to 16th centuries. It was destroyed during one of the Tatar raids in 1523. The city was later rebuilt and included a castle for defence purposes which later in the 18th century was dismantled by the Austrian authorities. In 1634 the city was destroyed once again by another Tatar raid. During the Khmelnytsky Uprising the Cossack Hetmanate army was reinforced by Hungarian regiments of Prince Rákóczi of Transylvania.

In the mid-18th century, Stryi's population was as follows: 89% Roman Catholics, 6% Greek Catholics, and 5% Jews. After the partition of the Polish–Lithuanian Commonwealth in 1772, the city became a part of the Austrian Empire (see: Partitions of Poland). During the revolutionary times in the Empire a Ruthenian Council was created in the city in 1848. During 1872-1875 the city was connected to the Austro-Hungarian railroad network. Its first train station was built in 1875. Around this time industrialisation began. Among the most influentual citizens of the city were Doctor Yevhen Olesnytsky, Father Oleksa Bobykevych, and Father O.Nyzhankivsky.

In 1886 a large fire burnt almost the entire city to the ground. From October 1914 to May 1915 Stryi was occupied by the Russian Empire. In 1915 a bloody World War I battle took place in the nearby Carpathian Mountains, around the peak of Zwinin (992 metres above sea level), a few kilometres south of Stryi in which some 33,000 Imperial Russian soldiers perished.

On 1 November 1918, an armed uprising took place in the town, after which it became a part of the short-lived West Ukrainian People's Republic. Stryi was again annexed by Poland in May 1919 during another invasion. In interbellum Poland, it was the capital of the Stryj County (area 2,081 square kilometres (803 sq mi), pop. 152,600) of the Stanisławów Voivodeship. According to the Polish census of 1931, its population consisted of 35.6% Jews, 34.5% Poles, 28% Ukrainians and 1.6% Germans.

During the 1939 Invasion of Poland, Stryi was occupied by Nazi Germany, but on 22 September transferred to the Soviet Union, whose forces entered from the east. As a result, Stryi became part of the Ukrainian SSR.

In July 1941, the Germans invaded all Galicia, including Stryi. In a short time, Ukrainians and local Poles conducted a pogrom in the Jews of the settlement, killing about 300 people. Between then and August, 1943, the Germans, with the assistance of the Ukrainian police, are said to have murdered most of the town's 11,000 Jews in a nearby forest or rounded them up to be sent to Belzec extermination camp. Of a pre-war population of 11,000, only a few Jews survived.

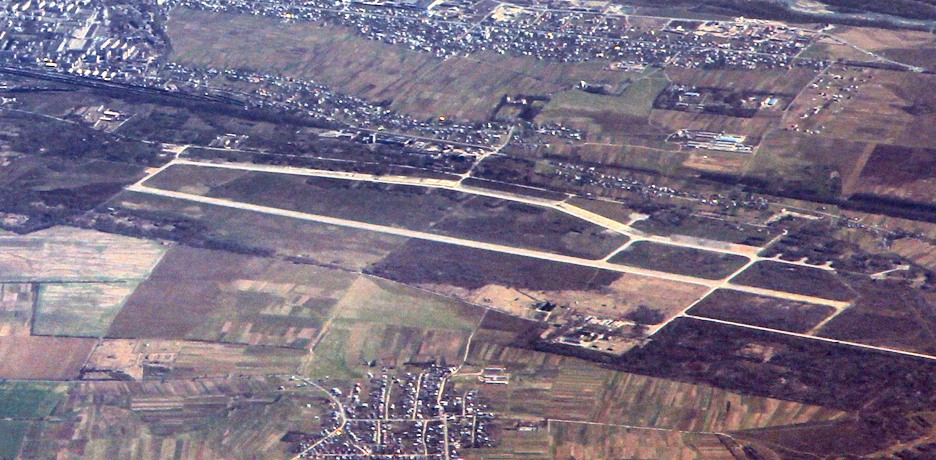
Stryi Air Base

During the Cold War the town was home to Stryi Air Base.

Stryi was the first city in Ukraine to display the Ukrainian flag, when it was hoisted at the Stryi city hall on 14 March 1990, before the December 1991 implosion of the Soviet Union.

=== Recent history ===
On 9 April 2009, the Lviv Oblast council decided to remove a Soviet-era statue to the Red Army soldier that was installed by the local Communist regime in the city of Stryi and move it to a museum of the Soviet totalitarianism, saying that the statue carries no historical or cultural value to the city.

Until 18 July 2020, Stryi was incorporated as a city of oblast significance and served as the administrative center of Stryi Raion even though it did not belong to the raion. In July 2020, as part of the administrative reform of Ukraine, which reduced the number of raions of Lviv Oblast to seven, the city of Stryi was merged into Stryi Raion.

== Population ==
Historical population

Year	Pop.	±%
1843	8,000	—
1880	12,600	+57.5%
1900	22,600	+79.4%
1910	27,400	+21.2%
1931	30,500	+11.3%
1959	36,200	+18.7%

Year	Pop.	±%
1970	48,000	+32.6%
1976	55,000	+14.6%
1989	67,000	+21.8%
2001	63,000	−6.0%
2006	61,700	−2.1%

== Economy ==
In 2023 an industrial park was opened in Stryi with the support of local government.

== Notable people ==
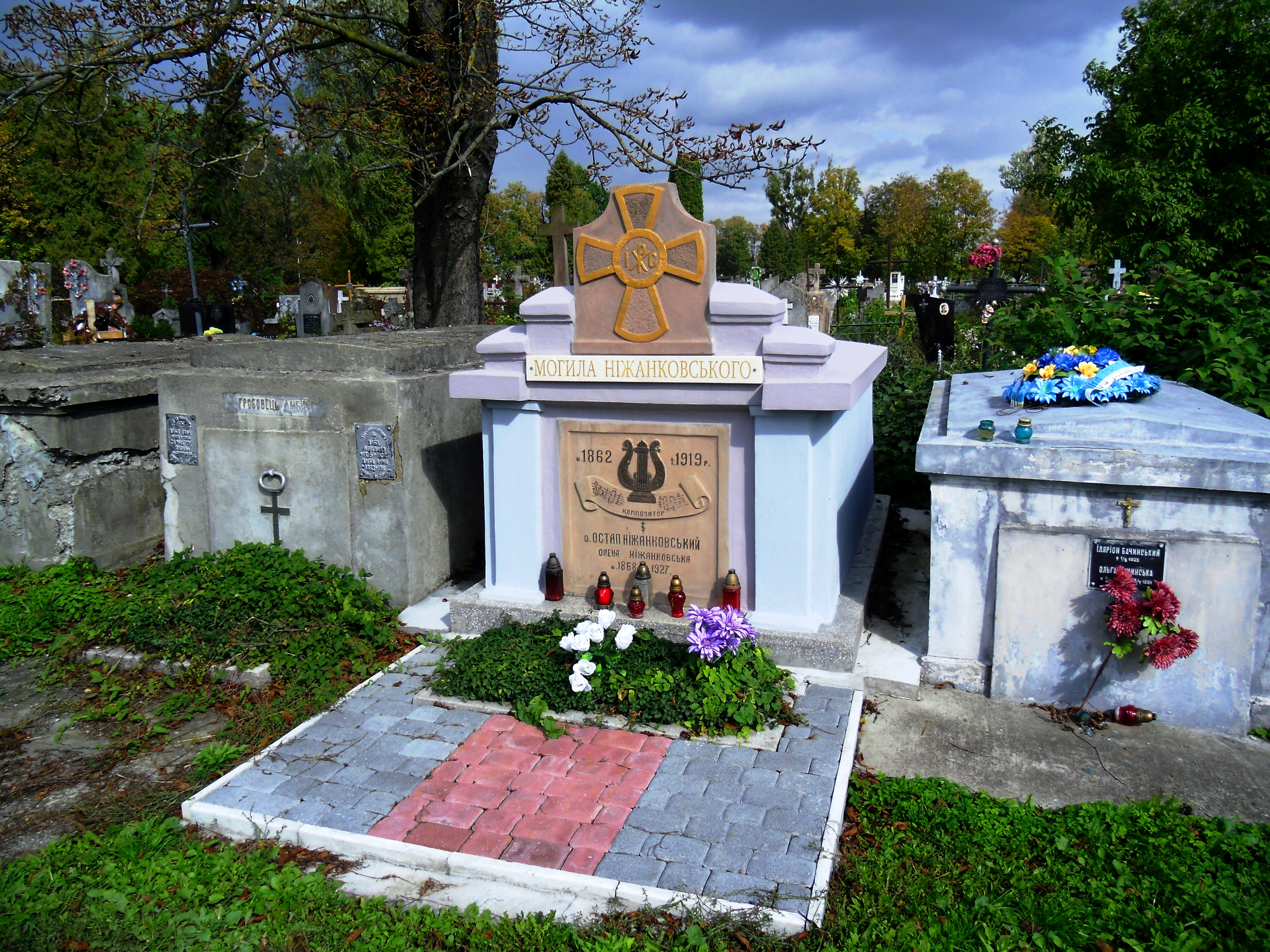
Tombs of Ostap Nyzhankivsky (1862-1919), Ukrainian Greek Catholic priest, composer and public figure, and his wife Helen (1868-1927) in Stryi

Notable people born in Stryi include:

- Anna Muzychuk (born 1990), Ukrainian chess player
- Mariya Muzychuk (born 1992), Ukrainian chess player
- Sviatoslav Shevchuk (born 1970), Major Archbishop of the Ukrainian Greek Catholic Church
- Vitaliy Antonov (born 1962), Ukrainian businessman
- Louis Begley (born 1933), Polish-American novelist
- Solomon J. Buchsbaum (1929–1993), Polish-American physicist
- Włodzimierz Godłowski (1900–1940), Polish neurologist
- Benedykt Halicz (1903–1997), Polish biologist
- Artem Hromov (born 1990), Ukrainian footballer
- Antoni (Illiashewicz) (born n.1700-1775), orth. bishop of Vjatka and Velikoperm, Russia
- Julia Keilowa (1902–1943), Polish designer
- Michael Kmit (1910–1981), Australian painter
- Jan Kociniak (1937–2007), Polish actor
- Józef Koffler (1896–1941), Polish composer
- Józef Kustroń (1892–1939), general of the Polish Army
- Kornel Makuszyński (1884–1953), Polish writer
- Zbigniew Messner (1929–2014), Prime Minister of Poland 1985–88
- Kazimierz Nowak (1897–1937), Polish traveller
- Taras Petrivskyi (born 1984), Ukrainian footballer
- Pola Stout (1902–1984), American interior and textile designer
- Julian Stryjkowski (1905–1996), Polish writer
- Zygmunt Szendzielarz (1910–1951), commandant of the Home Army
- Ihor Tenyukh (born 1958), Ukrainian admiral
- Andriy Tlumak (born 1979), Ukrainian footballer
- Kazimierz Wierzyński (1894–1969), Polish writer, poet
- Zygmunt Wojciechowski (1900–1955), Polish historian

== Twin towns – sister cities ==
Stryi is twinned with:

- Bălți, Moldova (1980)
- Düren, Germany (2001)
- Gradačac, Bosnia and Herzegovina
- Lwówek County, Poland (2005)
- Mansfield, England, United Kingdom
- Nowy Sącz, Poland
- Vegreville, Canada (2009)
- Zakopane, Poland (2004)

=== Other forms of cooperation ===
- Daugavpils, Latvia
- Kiskunhalas, Hungary
- Les Herbiers, France
- Leszno, Poland
