= Drohobych Petroleum and Gas College =

Technical college in Drohobych, Ukraine

Drohobych Petroleum and Gas College (Abbreviation: DPGC)
- Дрогобицький коледж нафти і газу (ДКНГ)
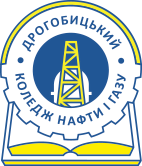
- Latin: Oleum et Vestibulum Collegium
- Former names: Drohobych Petroleum Technical College (before 2012)
- Type: Technical college
- Established: 20 January 1945
- President: Myron Babiak (since 2013)
- Academic staff: 99 (2017)
- Students: 1600 (2017)
- Location: Ukraine, Lviv region, Drohobych, Mykhailo Hrushevsky street, 57, 82100; 49.3535°N 23.5199°E
- Campus: Urban area
- Affiliations: Ministry of Education and Science of Ukraine
- Website: www.dkng.net.ua

Drohobych Petroleum and Gas College (Ukrainian: Дрогобицький коледж нафти і газу) is one of technical colleges in Drohobych, Ukraine. It was first established as Drohobych Petroleum Technical College in 1945, transforming into Petroleum and Gas College in 2012.

== Ukrainian SSR ==
Drohobych Petroleum and Gas College was founded as Drohobych Petroleum Technical College on January 20, 1945 (Decree №58 of the Ukrainian Government). Since its establishment the school trained over 20 thousand specialists in oil, gas and their refining industry.

The first graduation ceremony was held in 1948.

Given the increasing demand for industry specialists by Carpathian region companies, college opened a branch department in Boryslav in, 1953. Evening courses were dedicated to specialists training in the fields of "Exploitation of oil and gas wells" and "The technology of oil and gas".

In 1957 Drohobych Petroleum Technical College was merged with Lviv College of Petroleum Refining.

In 1958 college established distance-learning department, conducting training of specialists in the fields of "Drilling oil and gas wells", "Exploitation of oil and gas wells", "Equipment of oil and gas industries" and "Chemical technology of oil and gas".

In 1959 a new branch (evening school) was opened in Dolyna with the following disciplines offered: "Exploitation of oil and gas wells", "Equipment oil and gas industry" and "Oil and gas industry enterprises planning".

Due to the decrease in the number of applicants for evening departments, Boryslav and Dolyna branches ceased operations in 1973 and 1975 respectively.

== Post-Declaration ==
In 1997 Petroleum Technical College received a license qualifying it for training junior specialists in the field of "Banking" and "Gas and oil exploitation and storage management".

Currently, the college prepares specialists in nearly all specialties related to oil and gas extraction and processing.

In December 2006, the Ministry of Education and Science of Ukraine (Decree №64) accredited Petroleum Technical College as a higher educational institution of the first level and issued its first certificate of accreditation (license serial no. AB482982) granting college the right to provide educational services related to obtaining higher education level qualification "junior specialist".

In August 2012 college was renamed to "State Higher Educational Institution "Drohobych Petroleum and Gas College" (Decree №870 of the Ministry of Education of Ukraine).

== College today ==
College training is based on primary and secondary education on a full-time, part-time and distance learning basis. Total student population: 1600. Annual college intake ranges from 330 to 400 students. 46 of 99 teaching staff are lecturers of the first category, 7 - teaching Methodists, 3 PhDs, 4 Candidates of Science.

The College operates in conjunction with the Ivano-Frankivsk National Technical University of Oil and Gas, Kyiv Polytechnic Institute and Dnipro State Chemical Technology University. College is also represented as educational consulting office of Ivano-Frankivsk National Technical University of Oil and Gas where alumni may continue their education at university of IV-th accreditation level. The best college graduates can enroll in partner universities for shorter term programmes (3 years instead of 4).

Full-time / part-time teaching is based on personal financing contracts and government scholarship schemes.

List of specialties:

- Business Economics;
- Oil and gas processing;
- Oil and gas wells drilling;
- Oil and gas wells operation;
- Oil and gas wells exploitation;
- Oil and gas storage and transportation;
- Oil and gas infrastructure repair and maintenance;
- Automative production systems installation and maintenance;

== Notable alumni ==
- Fedyshyn V. - Doctor of Geology;
- Kovalko Mikhail - Ukrainian politician;
- Yaremiichuk Roman - Doctor of Engineering, professor;
- Lutsiv Y. - Candidate of geological-mineralogical sciences;
- Kabyshev B. - Doctor of geological-mineralogical sciences, professor;
- Rybchych Ilya I. - the former CEO of "Ukrainian gas extraction" Company Limited;
- Kondrat Roman - Doctor of Engineering, Professor at Ivano-Frankivsk National Technical University of Oil and Gas;
- Matieshin Ivan - Ukrainian philanthropist and political activist, Director of "Oil Company" Krasnoleninsk Gas & Oil Co.".

== See also ==
- Higher education in Ukraine
- List of universities in Ukraine
