= Drohobych Mechanical Technological College =

Technical college in Drohobych, Ukraine

Coordinates: 49.3502°N 23.5378°E

Drohobych Mechanical Technological College (DTMFC)
- Дрогобицький механіко-технологічний фаховий коледж (абревіатура: ДТМФК)
- Latin: Mechanica Technicitate Collegium
- Former names: Drohobych Technical School (1939), Drohobych Electro-Mechanical College (1944);
- Type: Technical college
- Established: 17 June 1939
- Affiliations: Ministry of Education and Science of Ukraine (MON)
- President: Bohdan Zvir (since 2015)
- Academic staff: 102 (2017)
- Students: 710 (2017)
- Location: Ukraine, Lviv reg., Drohobych, Ranevytska street, 12, 82100
- Campus: Urban area
- Website: dmtc.org.ua

Drohobych Mechanical Technological College (Ukrainian: Дрогобицький механіко-технологічний коледж, romanized: Drohobytskyi mekhaniko-tekhnolohichnyi koledzh) or DTMC (Ukrainian: ДТМК) is a technical college in Drohobych, Ukraine. It was first established as Drohobych Technical School in 1939, transforming into Electro-Mechanical and later - Mechanical Technological College. It is the alma mater of many Ukrainian Drohobych and Lviv region politicians and public activists.

== History ==
=== Ukrainian SSR ===
Drohobych secondary technical school was in 1939 reformed into was state-owned Drohobych Mechanical College established under the Ministry of Education and Science of Ukraine Decree. It was designed to meet needs in professional employees for oil refineries, in Drohobych, Boryslav and other parts of Drohobych district.

The World War II interrupted the educational process in college. It was restored later in 1944 when institution changed name to Drohobych Electro-Mechanical College. The first graduation ceremony was held in 1948.

In 1949 the college opened courses in metalworking and processing. Later, in 1952, it also run programmes to prepare engineers in wood and furniture manufacturing industries.

In 1956 the Ministry of Energy of Ukraine transferred college to Economic department of Ivano-Frankivsk Municipality, and in 1967 college became special industrial educational institution under jurisdiction of the Ukrainian SSR Ministry of Chemical and Petroleum Engineering.

=== Post-Declaration ===
As of 28 November 1991 more than 10,000 professionals im engineering industry graduated from the college.

On 14 June 1995 Ministry of Education (Decree No.175) accredited college with the first level of certification. On 1 April 2006 the college was accredited as HEI and received the status of higher education institution of the I level. In 2008 it was also nominated into category of government state HEIs and approved on November 27 of the same year. Today college trains future professionals based on government annual requests and contractual obligations. College prepares qualified specialists for engineering and other fields.

== College today ==
=== Specialties ===
Mechanical Technological College provides regular (part- and full-time) trainings in the following fields:

- Design;
- Paperwork (3-month);
- Accounting (6-month);
- Software Development.
- Tools manufacturing and production;
- Control systems and automated lines maintenance;
- Handling machines and automated lines materials processing;

The College also provides vocational training, retraining and advanced training in the following specialties:

- Miller;
- Turner;
- Driller;
- Cargo slinger;
- Computer (typing) operator;
- Automated machinery operator;
- Secretary (for organizations);
- Heat station (boiler house) operator;
- Locksmith (measuring instruments);
- Chimneys, furnaces and fireplace cleaner;
- Locksmith (gas equipment operation and repair);

=== Purposes ===
College prepares young professionals for enterprises, institutions and organizations of the Western region (specifically - Lviv, Ternopil, Ivano-Frankivsk and Zakarpattia.

The college closely cooperates with Ivano-Frankivsk National Technical University of Oil and Gas and the National University "Lviv Polytechnic". Since 1994 it allows college students to apply for speed training programmes (that are 3 instead of 4 years long) in specialties "Manufacturing Engineering", "Documentation" and "Accounting and Auditing", and eventually graduate faster than counterparts.

Full-time / part-time teaching is based on personal financing contracts and government scholarship schemes.

== Facilities ==
Material and technical base of the college includes 4 educational buildings, library, teaching and production workshops (equipped with advanced materials processing and metalworking equipment), numeric control (CNC) machines, six computer laboratories, two gyms, student hall, outside research area.

== Manufacturing ==
The production base of the college began to develop in 1957 in form of staff re-training and partial replenishment of workshop equipment. In 1960 technical facilities were expended with smithy operation and increasing production volumes. The first product of the college - pipe cutters supplied to many parts of the Soviet Union. Since 1967, when the college became a professional industry institution (under jurisdiction of the Ministry of Chemical and Petroleum Engineering of the Ukrainian SSR), technical workshops concentrated mainly on requirements of "Drohobych Drilling Plant" including nozzle drill (chisel) bits "244.5 OK - PV", "TC SH2699 - PGV", bits covers "C - Wildebeest". Workshops were replenished with new equipment, dramatically improving the quality of students' practical training.

Since 2001, teaching and production studios are working in close cooperation with local JSC "Drohobych Drilling Plant" (DDP). DDP requested multiple products to be designed and manufactured by the college, including components for bits of different brands:

- Yokes "KTSR4" - 100,004;
- Rings "KTSR4" - 100,005;
- Pipes "393.7-C" - TSHV 1.004;
- Tanks covers "D0705", "R6090";
- Nozzles "244.5-OK" - PGV D26.007;
- "Glasses "C 393.7" - TSHV 4.007;
- 244.5 Filters - PGV D26. 013, 013-1.

In 2006, educational-production workshops began to produce parts for JSC "Drohobych truck crane plant". This includes 40 types of components varying in complexity for mobile cranes. Products release for engineering plants created excellent working conditions for the practical training of students.

== Notable alumni ==
- Leseshak Dmytro (Ukrainian: Лесешак Дмитро) - Ukrainian soldier of 24th mechanized brigade killed on August 21, 2014 due to Russian military intervention in Ukraine (2014–present) in Donbas war for temporarily occupied and uncontrolled territories of Ukraine .

== See also ==
- Education in Ukraine
- Higher education in Ukraine
- List of universities in Ukraine
