= Józef Schreier =

Polish mathematician (1909- 1943)

Józef Schreier (Polish pronunciation: [ˈjuzɛf ˈʂrajɛr]; 18 February 1909, Drohobycz, Austria-Hungary – April 1943, Drohobycz, Occupied Poland) was a Polish mathematician of Jewish origin, known for his work in functional analysis, group theory and combinatorics. He was a member of the Lwów School of Mathematics and a victim of the Holocaust.

Józef Schreier was born on 18 February 1909 in Drohobycz. His father was a rabbi and doctor of philosophy. His cousin was the musician Alfred Schreyer. From 1927-31 he studied at the Jan Kazimierz University in Lwów.

In his first published paper, he defined what later came to be known as Schreier sets in order to show that not all Banach spaces possess the weak Banach-Saks property, disproving a conjecture of Stefan Banach and Stanisław Saks. Schreier sets were later discovered independently by researchers in Ramsey theory.

Schreier completed his master's degree On tournament elimination systems in 1932 under the direction of Hugo Steinhaus. Schreier correctly conjectured that to determine the second largest number in an unordered list requires at least $n + \lceil \log_2 n \rceil -2$ comparisons. In 1934, he completed his doctorate, On finite base in topological groups under Banach.

In 1932 he married Zofia Rosenblatt. Schreier often played blindfold chess.

He was a friend of Stanisław Ulam and co-authored eight papers with him. They were the only two undergraduates who attended the meetings at the Scottish Café in Lwów. (Schreier contributed ten questions to the Scottish Book.) Together they proved the Baire–Schreier–Ulam theorem and Schreier–Ulam theorem.

According to Ulam,

We would meet almost every day, occasionally at the coffee house but more often at my house. His home was in Drohobycz, a little town and petroleum center south of Lwów. What a variety of problems and methods we discussed together! Our work, while still inspired by the methods then current in Lwów, branched into new fields: groups of topological transformations, groups of permutations, pure set theory, general algebra. I believe that some of our papers were among the first to show applications to a wider class of mathematical objects of modern set theoretical methods combined with a more algebraic point of view. We started work on the theory of groupoids, as we called them, or semi-groups, as they are called now.

With the outbreak of World War II, Eastern Poland including Drohobycz was occupied by the USSR in accordance with the Molotov–Ribbentrop Pact. After Operation Barbarossa, this territory was invaded by Nazi Germany. The Jews of Drohobycz were confined to the Drohobycz Ghetto. In April 1943, the Germans discovered—or were informed of—an underground bunker in which Schreier was hiding with other Jews. It took three days for them to force their way in. Schreier committed suicide by cyanide rather than be captured. Of a prewar Jewish population of 10,000 in Drohobycz, approximately 400 survived the war. Schreier's wife was one of them and later moved to Israel, where she remarried. Schreier's cousin Gina Schreier survived the war in Poland and later emigrated to Brazil with her husband, Bronisław Hoenig. After Ulam’s death, Ulam’s wife passed her the articles they had primarily written together.

== Publications ==
- Schreier, Józef; Ulam, Stanislaw (1936), "Über die Automorphismen der Permutationsgruppe der natürlichen Zahlenfolge" (PDF), Fundamenta Mathematicae (in German), 28: 258–260, doi:10.4064/fm-28-1-258-260, Zbl 0016.20301
