= Paula Szalit =

Polish pianist and composer

Paulina Szalitówna (25 November 1885 – 7 February 1942),more commonly known as Paula Szalit, was a Polish pianist and composer.

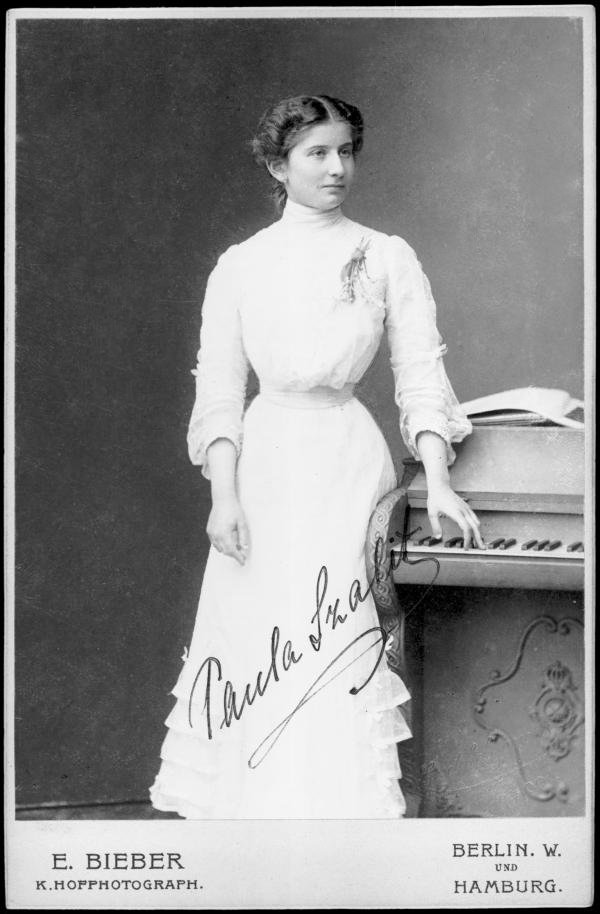
Paula Szalit

== Early life ==
She was born in Drohobycz, Galicia, near Lemberg (now Lviv), the fourth child of Simon Szalit, an accountant, and Reisel née Bressler. Initially taught music by her brother Henryk (Heinrich), from 1893 she studied piano in Vienna. Her teachers included: Robert Fischof; Heinrich Schenker (1896–97); Eugen d'Albert (1897); C. Hoffmann; and Theodor Leschetizky.

Szalit was regarded as a child prodigy and made numerous appearances in Vienna, Germany, Poland and London. She received generally superlative notices, such as these:

"The musical clientele at Vienna are much interested in an infant phenomena, Paula Szalit, aged ten. When she was scarcely out of long clothes, she would pick out on the piano, with one finger, the notes of a tune that she had heard sung, and long before she had any idea of printed notes she would play melodies of her own composition—songs, dances, etc. Her musical adroitness was not cultivated until she was seven years old, when she was given lessons, first by her brother, and later by Prof. Fischof and by Eugen d'Albert. It is said that little Paula's playing is charming, not only because of her clear technique and vigorous tone, astonishing from hands so small that they can scarcely stretch an octave, but also because of the artistic feeling she displays. Little Paula has very sensible parents who see that she does not overtax her strength. She has never toured in concert but has appeared in public in Vienna, Prague, and Berlin."

And another review:

"She is mistress of her instrument in every respect; she understands its genius. As far as technique in the ordinary sense goes she has nothing to learn. . . . Her phrasing had the quality of inevitableness, which can never be the effect of the mediocre mind in music. . . . Miss Szalit has also the mind that grasps the inner meaning of the art; the spirituality that sees in it more than sensuous tonal beauty...By almost universal consent she has been recognised as an artist of quite exceptional attainments."

Occasionally her reviews were more muted, such as this:

"Her readings of works by Beethoven, Mendelssohn, and Chopin were lacking in depth of sentiment, but they displayed an intelligence and musical feeling which, combined with a sympathetic touch and great executive facility, testify to exceptional ability."

Szalit was described by Niemann as "a veritable phenomenon of pianistic and musical talent." Artur Schnabel deemed her the greatest child prodigy in history.

Nieman remarked that she could transpose at sight. Bie said she could transpose fugues at sight.

From her first public recital in 1895 until 1906, Szalit performed not only solo recitals but also concertos with leading orchestras and chamber music with well-known ensembles widely throughout continental Europe and England. In September 1906, she was appointed head of the advanced piano class at the Lemberg Conservatory.

== Later life ==
After 1906 Szalit disappeared from the public arena. (The Polish Wikipedia article pl:Paulina Szalitówna mentions a reported concert in the autumn of 1913 with violinist Paul Kochański.) In 1918 she tried to re-establish herself on the Vienna musical scene. She repeated the attempt on March 27, 1921:

"Piano instruction. The well-known pianist Paula Szalit offers first-class instruction, she also undertakes lessons in piano accompaniment and repetiteur work. Rotenlöwgasse 7, Apt 21."

Paula Szalit died in a mental institution in Kulparkóv, near Lviv, in 1942, where she was buried without coffin on 12 February.

== Works ==
For piano unless noted.

- Intermezzo in G sharp
- Praeludium
- Carpiccio (F minor)
- Miniatures
- Morceaux, op. 2 (1900):
  - 1. Rêverie
  - 2. Impromptu
  - 3. Tendresse
  - 4. Scène de Ballet
  - 5. Mazurka
  - 6. Valse
  - 7. Intermezzo
  - 8. Gavotte
- Traeumerei (1897)
- Intermezzo, Op. 3, no. 3.
- Impromptu in F, Op. 3
- Im Winter: „Schlaf ein, mein süsses Kind“ (1897) (for voice and piano)
