= Alfred Schreyer =

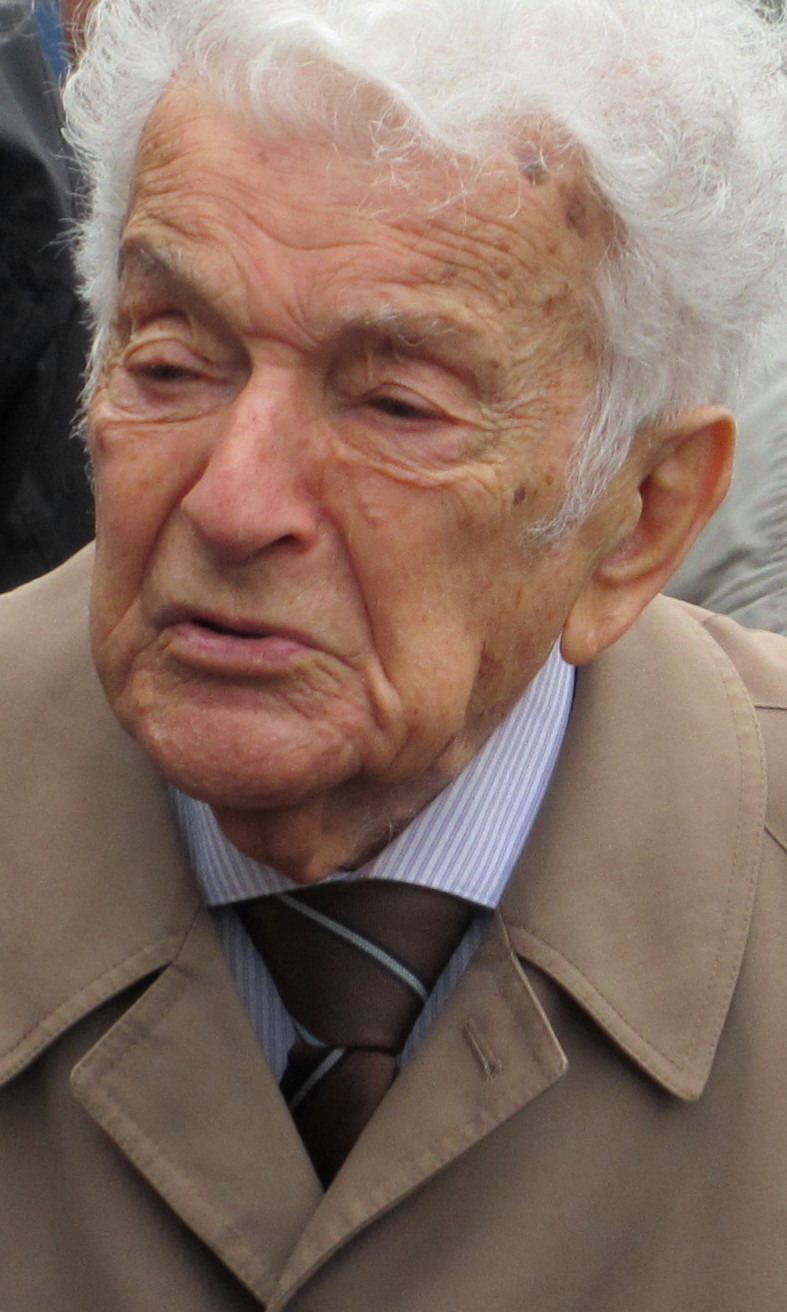
Alfred Schreyer (2012)

Alfred Schreyer (Yiddish אַלפֿרÀעד שרייער; born 8 May 1922 in Drohobych, Ukraine died 25 April 2015 in Warsaw) was a Polish-Jewish fiddler and singer, a pupil of Bruno Schulz and survivor of the Holocaust.

== Early life ==
Alfred Schreyer was born on 8 May 1922 in Drohobych in east Galicia, then part of Poland, to a Jewish family. His father, Benno, was a chemist at the Austrian company Gartenberg & Schreyer, and his mother, Leontina, was a pharmacist. His cousin Józef Schreier was a mathematician.

== Second World War ==
In September 1939, Drohobych was occupied by German forces. Shortly thereafter, Schreyer witnessed the occupying forces turn the rabbis to the road on the date of Rosh Hashanah, the Jewish New Year.

In October that same year, the town came under Soviet occupation. The family lost their house and Schreyer's father was forced to work in the paraffin factory. Working as a member of a vocal quartet with the appearance of a Soviet culture brigade, Schreyer purchased for his father working boots for the wet work in the factory, using his first eighty rubles.

At the start of the German-Soviet War in June 1941, Drohobych became part of the district of Galicia under the General Government. The German occupiers directed local Jews, including Schreyer, to the Drohobych ghetto. In 1942, Schreyer began working as a carpenter in a forced labour camp. Following the dissolution of the camp in 1943, he began working in a warehouse for the Carpathian Oil Company.

He was taken to the Krakow-Plaszow concentration camp on 14 April 1944. Schreyer remarked, "But this hell was only limbo, compared with what was to come." In October 1944 he was transferred to the Gross-Rosen concentration camp, and on 4 November that year he was sent to the Buchenwald camp in Block 59. Schreyer stated, "until 6 April 1945 when we were evacuated, I weighed only 39 kilos, had bulges in the legs and was a living corpse." On the march Schreyer fell into a group of German prisoners. A fellow inmate said to him quietly "look out" (German: "Pass auf") and pushed him into a ditch. Schreyer referred to this event as "his salvation". After a few hours he was taken by a Hitler youth to the next village.

Schreyer's father died in early August 1942, together with around 5000 Jews from Drohobych in Belzec extermination camp. His mother escaped from Belzec but was caught and shot with 11,000 others and buried in a mass grave.

Shortly before death he moved to Warsaw, where he died.

== After the war ==
Initially, Schreyer worked as an interpreter for Soviet troops in Saxony. He was repatriated in August 1946 and later moved to Belarus. There, he spoke to a violinist and began to study again. On 5 January 1949, he married a woman named Ludmilla. He had two children, both of whom have been living in Germany since 1993. Schreyer's wife died a few years before him.

Before his death, Schreyer was the last Jew living in Drohobych born before the Second World War.

On his 90th birthday, Schreyer was awarded the highest award in Poland in the cultural sector, the Gloria Artis Medal of Cultural Merit by the Polish Minister of Culture. With this award his efforts for the preservation of Polish culture have been recognised internationally.

In 2011, Paul Rosdy produced a film detailing Schreyer's life entitled "The Last Jew of Drohobych" (German: Der letze Jude von Drohobycz).
