= Drohobych =

City in Lviv Oblast, Ukraine

Drohobych Дрогобич
- City
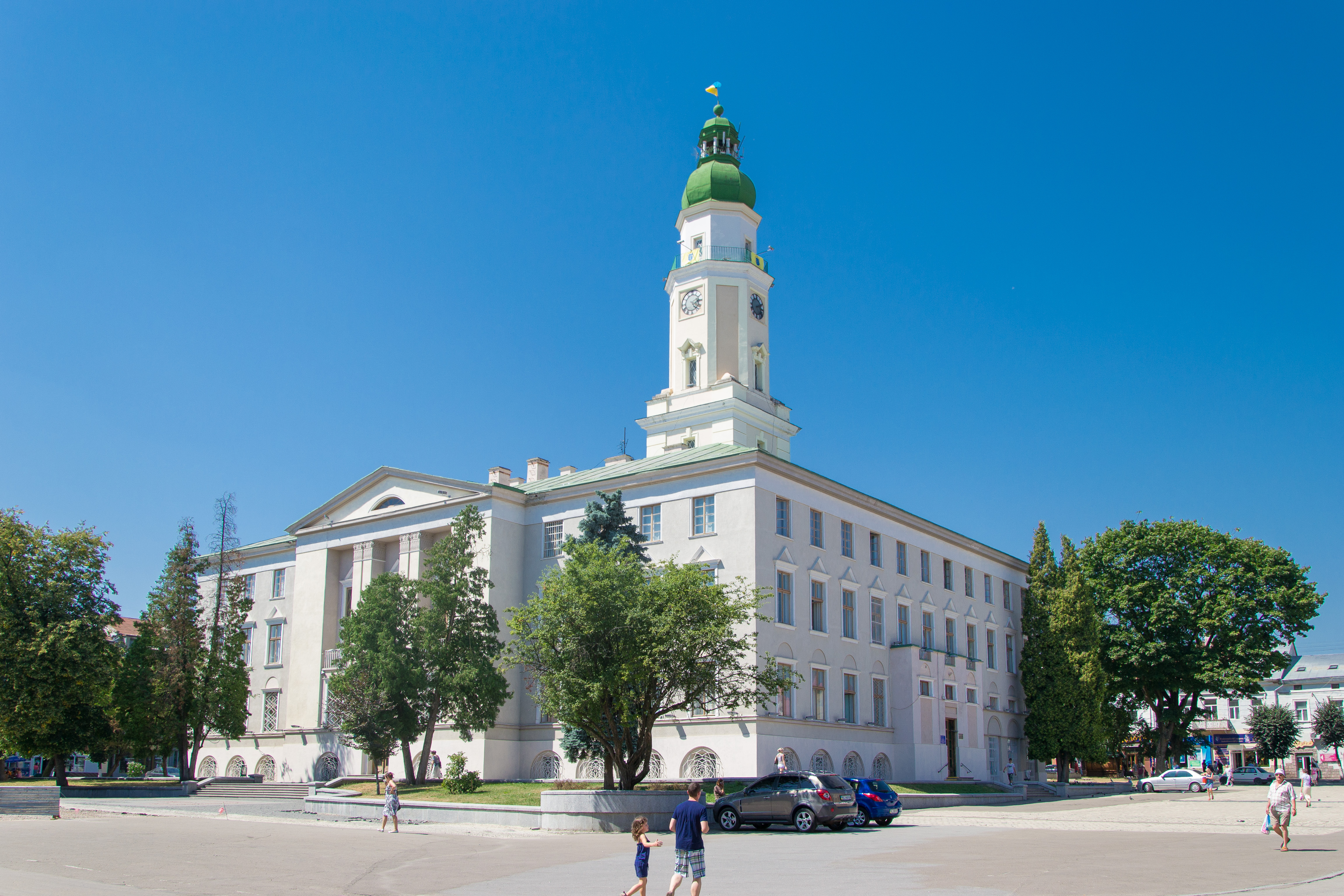
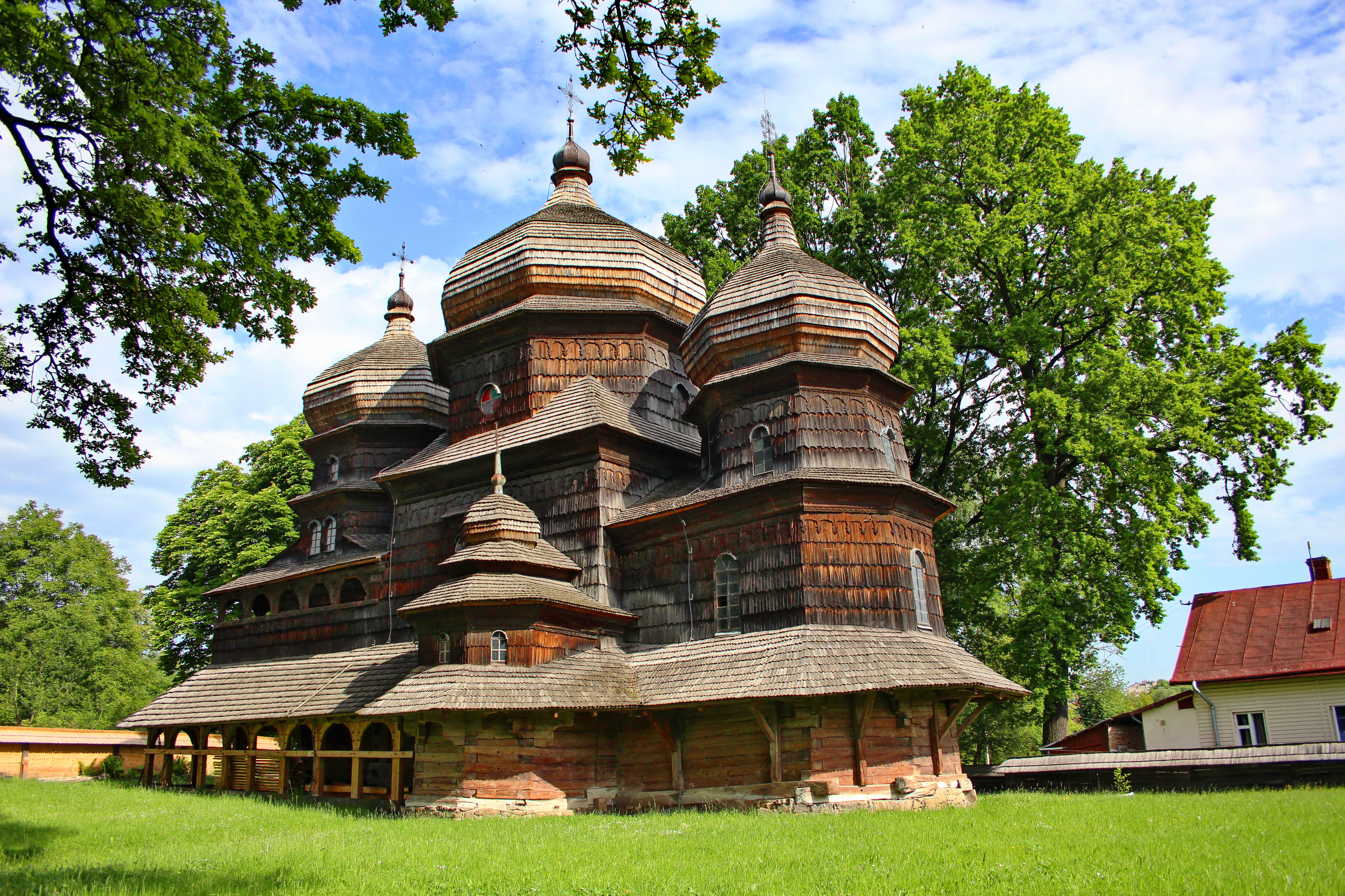
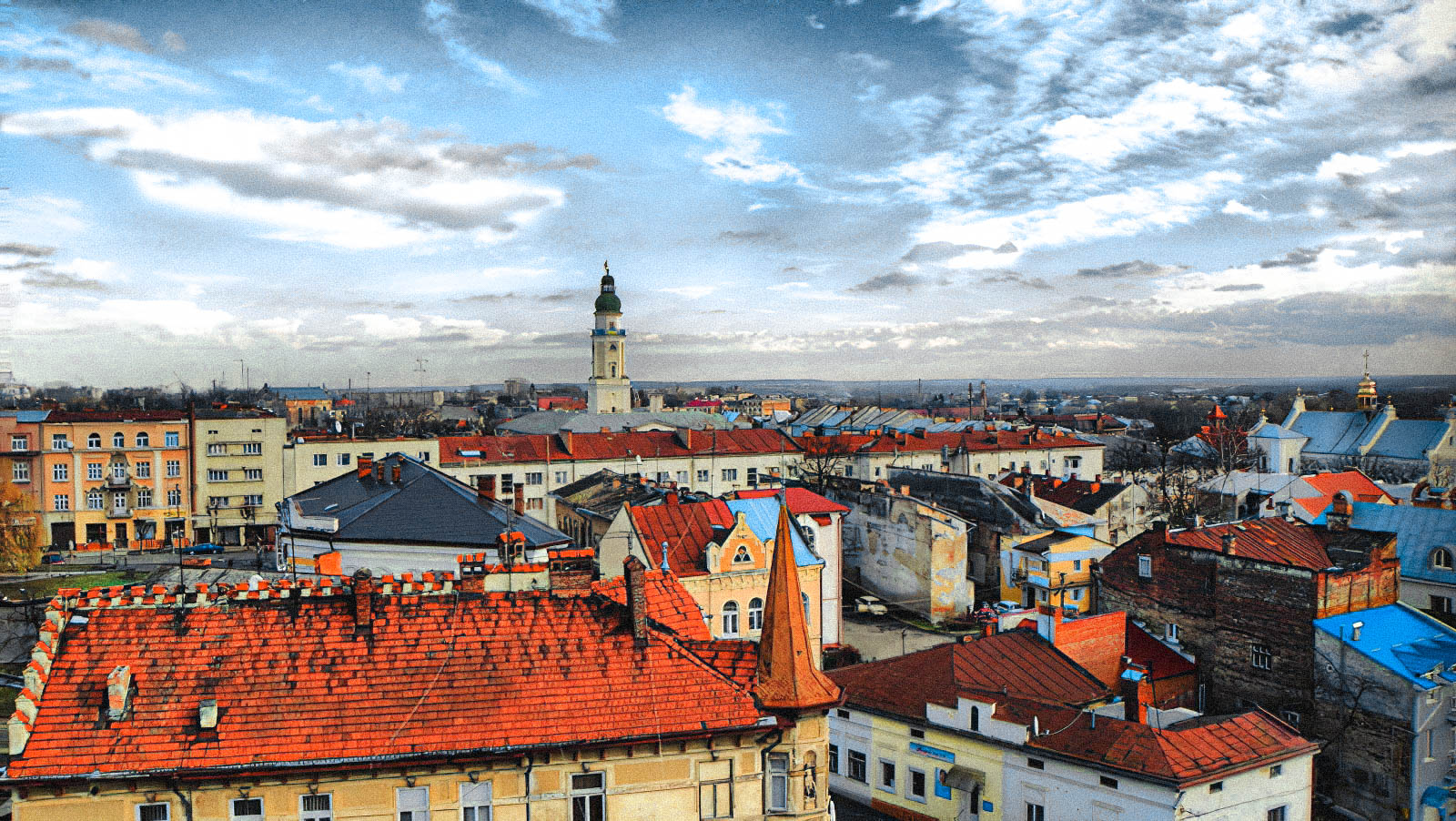
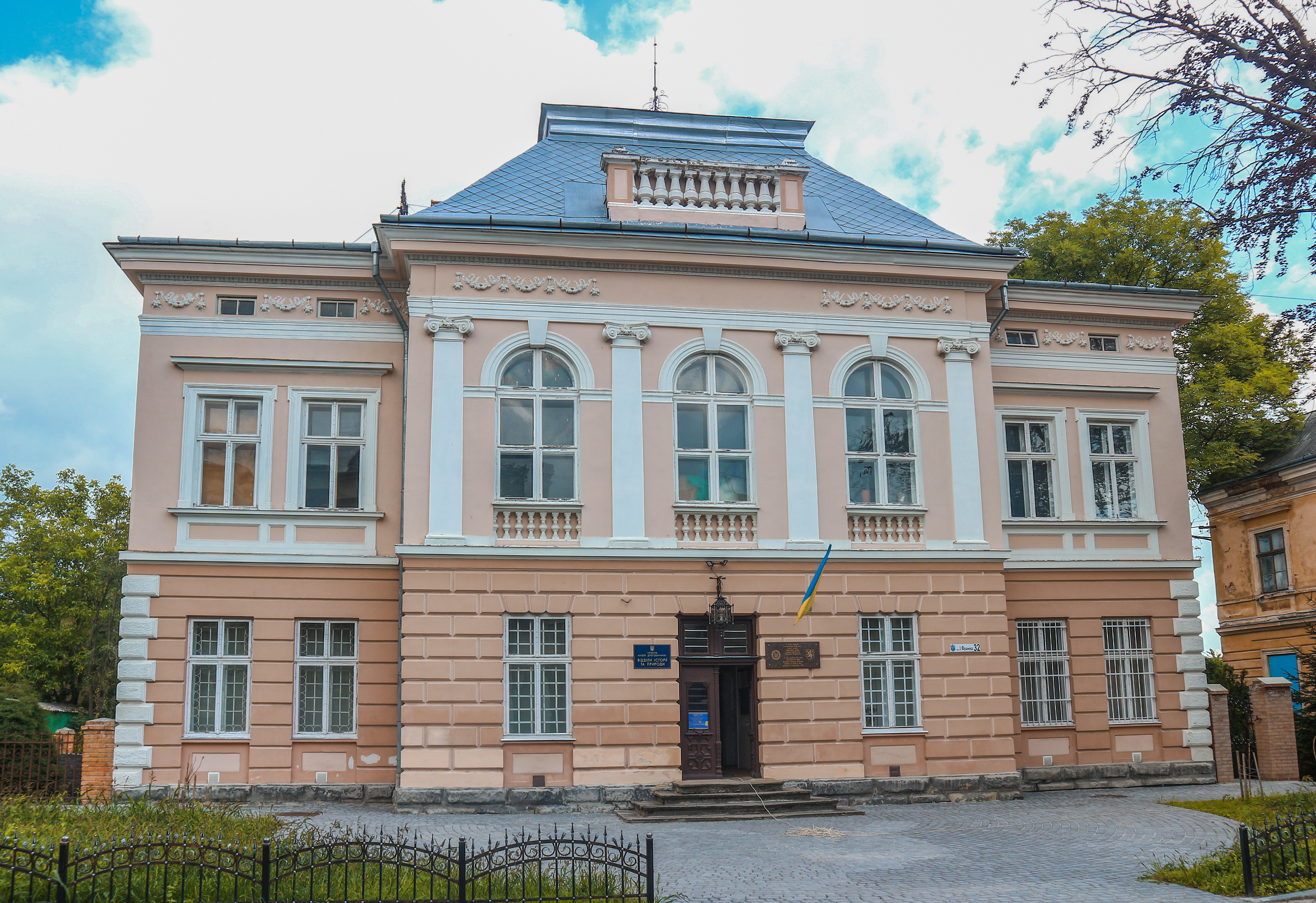
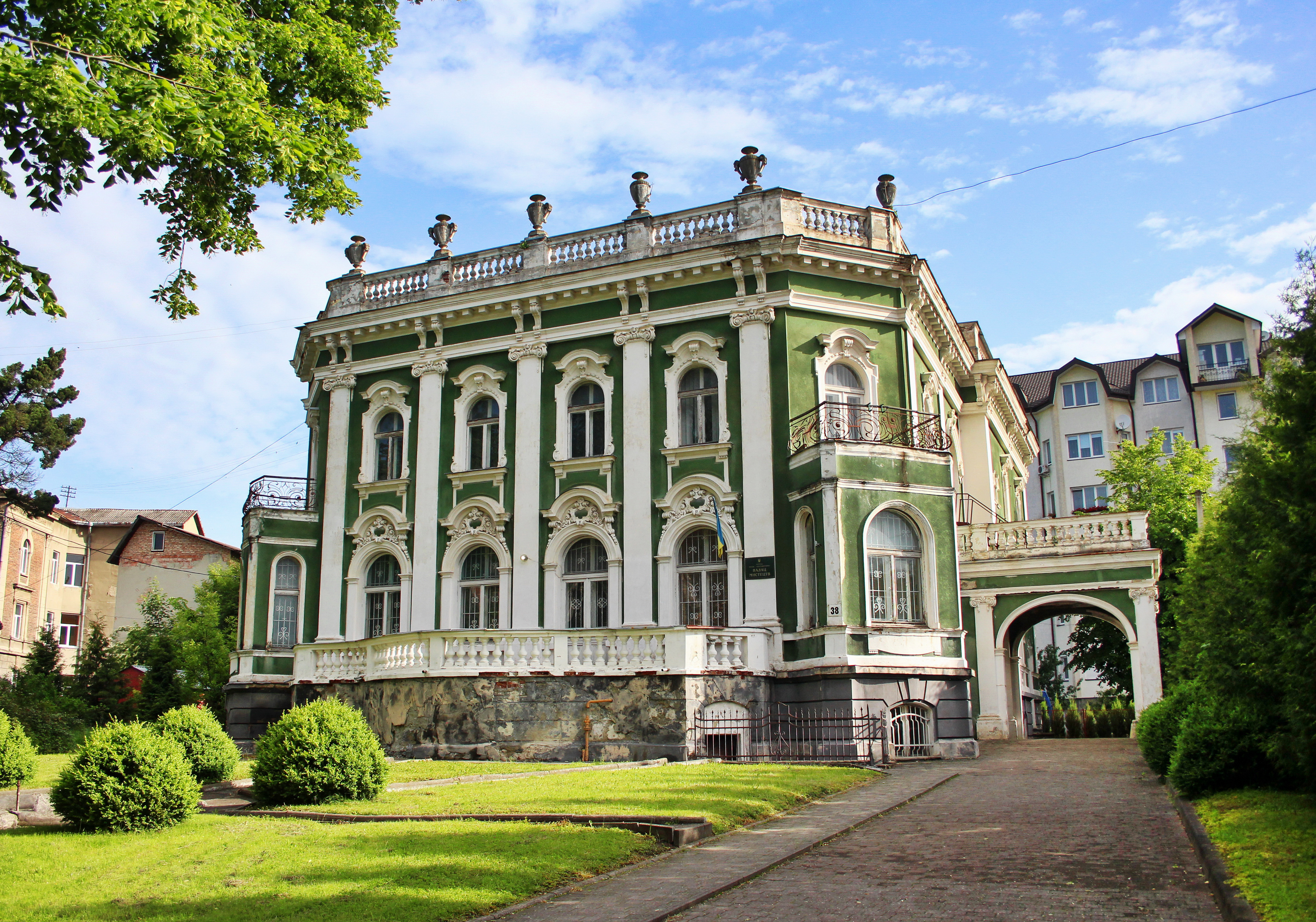
- Town Hall St. George's Church Historic Centre of Drohobych Residential House at Ivana Franka Street, 32 Bianka Villa

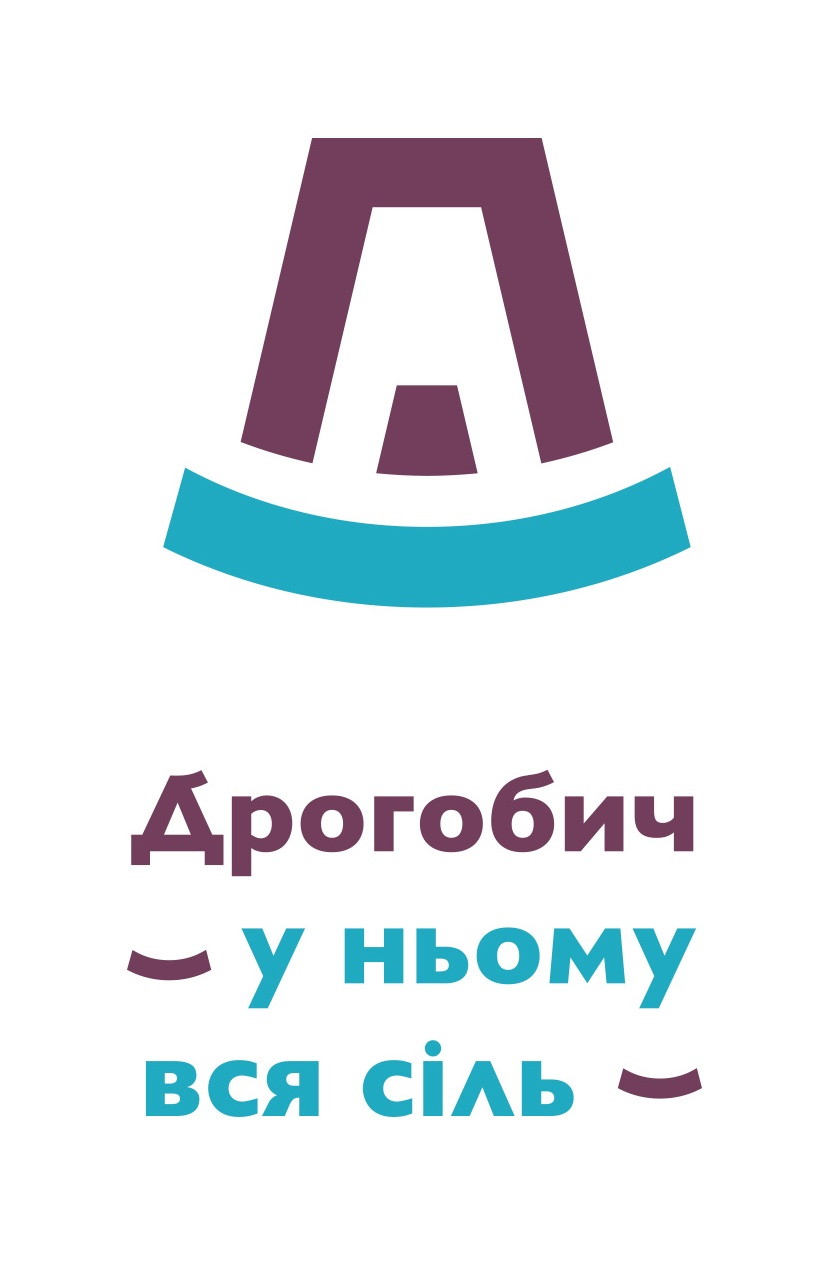
- Flag Coat of arms Logo
- Interactive map of Drohobych
- Location of Drohobych Drohobych (Ukraine)
- Coordinates: 49°21′00″N 23°30′00″E
- Country: Ukraine
- Oblast: Lviv Oblast
- Raion: Drohobych Raion
- Hromada: Drohobych urban hromada
- First mentioned: 1387

Government
  - Mayor: Taras Kuchma

Area
  - Total: 41.0 km^{2} (15.8 sq mi)
- Highest elevation: 371 m (1,217 ft)

Population (2022)
  - Total: 73,682
  - Density: 1,800/km^{2} (4,650/sq mi)
- Website: http://www.drohobych-rada.gov.ua/

Drohobych (Ukrainian: Дрогобич [droˈɦɔbɪt͡ʃ]; Polish: Drohobycz [drɔˈxɔbɨt͡ʂ]; Yiddish: דראָהאָביטש, romanized: Drohobitsh) is a city in the south of Lviv Oblast, Ukraine. It is the administrative center of Drohobych Raion and hosts the administration of Drohobych urban hromada, one of the hromadas of Ukraine. In 1939–1941 and 1944–1959 it was the center of Drohobych Oblast.

Drohobych was founded at the end of the eleventh century as an important trading post and transport node between Kievan Rus' and the lands to the West of Rus'. After extinction of the local Ruthenian dynasty and subsequent incorporation of the Kingdom of Galicia–Volhynia into the Polish Kingdom by 1349, from the fifteenth century the city developed as a mercantile and saltworks centre. Drohobych became part of the Habsburg Empire in 1772 after the first partition of the Polish–Lithuanian Commonwealth. In the mid-nineteenth century it became Europe's largest oil extraction center, which significantly contributed to its rapid development. In the renascent, interwar Poland it was the center of a county within the Lwów Voivodeship. As an outcome of World War II, the city was incorporated into the Ukrainian part of the Soviet Union, which in 1991 became the independent Ukraine.

The city was the birthplace of such well-known personalities as Elisabeth Bergner, Yuriy Drohobych (Kotermak), Ivan Franko and Bruno Schulz. The city has several oil refineries. The Drohobych saltworks are considered to be the oldest in Europe. The estimated population of Drohobych is 73,682 (2022 estimate), making it the second largest city in Lviv Oblast.

== History ==
While there are only legendary accounts of it, Drohobych probably existed in the Kievan Rus' period. According to a legend, there was a settlement, called Bych, of salt-traders. When Bych was destroyed in a Cumanian raid, survivors rebuilt the settlement in a nearby location under its current name which means a Second Bych. In the time of Kievan Rus', the Tustan fortress was built near Drohobych. However, scholars perceive this legend with skepticism, pointing out that Drohobych is a Polish pronunciation of Dorogobuzh, a common East Slavic toponym applied to three different towns in Kievan Rus'.

The city was first mentioned in 1387 in the municipal records of Lviv, in connection with a man named Martin (or Marcin) of Drohobych. Furthermore, the same chronicler's List of all Ruthenian cities, the farther and the near ones in Voskresensky Chronicle (dated 1377–82) mentions Другабець (Druhabets') among other cities in Volhynia that existed at the same time such as Холмъ (Kholm), Лвовъ Великій (Lviv the Great).

In 1392 Polish king Vladislav II ordered the construction of the first Roman Catholic municipal parish church (Polish: Kosciół farny), using the foundations of older Ruthenian buildings. In the Polish–Lithuanian Commonwealth, the city was the center of large rural starostvo (county within the Ruthenian Voivodeship).

Drohobych received Magdeburg rights some time in the 15th century (sources differ as to the exact year, some giving 1422 or 1460, or 1496 but in 1506 the rights were confirmed by King Alexander the Jagiellonian). The salt industry was significant in the fourteenth to sixteenth centuries.

From the early seventeenth century, a Ukrainian Catholic brotherhood existed in the city. In 1648, during the Khmelnytsky Uprising, the Cossacks stormed the city and its cathedral. Most of the local Poles, as well as the Greek Catholics and the Jews, were murdered at the time, while some managed to survive in the Bell tower not taken in the raid. The 1772 partition of Poland gave the city to the Habsburg monarchy. In the 19th century, significant oil resources were discovered in the area, making the city an important center of the oil and natural gas industries.

After World War I, the area became part of the short-lived independent West Ukrainian People's Republic (ZUNR). The ZUNR was taken over by the Second Polish Republic after the Polish–Ukrainian War and Drohobych became part of the Lwów Voivodeship in 1919. In 1928 the still extant Ukrainian private gymnasium (academically oriented secondary school) opened in the center of the city. The population reached some 40,000 in the late 1920s, and its oil refinery at Polmin became one of the biggest in Europe, employing 800 people. Numerous visitors came there to view the wooden Greek Catholic churches, among them the Church of St. Yur, which was regarded as the most beautiful such construction in the Second Polish Republic, with frescoes from 1691. Drohobych was also a major sports center (see: Junak Drohobycz).

In September 1939, after the German and Soviet invasion of Poland and according to the Ribbentrop-Molotov agreement, the city was annexed to Soviet Ukraine. After the invasion Nazi Germany wanted to incorporate the city into its General Government due to its oil fields, but the USSR refused and annexed it. In Soviet Ukraine, Drohobych became the center of the Drohobych Oblast (region). Its local Polish boy scouts created the White Couriers organization, which in late 1939 and early 1940 smuggled hundreds of people from the Soviet Union to Hungary across the Soviet-Hungarian border in the Carpathian Mountains. In early July 1941, during the first weeks of the Nazi invasion of the USSR, the city was occupied by Nazi Germany.

Pre-war Drohobych had a significant Jewish community of about 15,000 people, 40% of the total population. Immediately after the Germans entered the city, Ukrainian nationalists started a pogrom which lasted for three days, supported by the Wehrmacht. During 1942 there were several selections, deportations, and murders in the streets, again led by German troops and Ukrainian Auxiliary Police. In October 1942, Drohobych ghetto was established with approximately 10,000 prisoners, including Jews brought from neighboring localities. In June 1943, the German administration and troops liquidated the ghetto. Only 800 Jews from Drohobych survived. On 6 August 1944, the German occupation ended and the Red Army entered the city. Despite the large Jewish population prior to the war, a current resident has stated that he was one of only two Jews who came back to his village to live after 1945. After the war, the city remained an oblast center until the Drohobych Oblast was incorporated into the Lviv Oblast in 1959. In Soviet times, Drohobych became an important industrial center of Western Ukraine, with highly developed oil-refining, machine building, woodworking, food, and light industries.

Until 18 July 2020, Drohobych was designated as a city of oblast significance and belonged to Drohobych Municipality but not to Drohobych Raion, even though it was the center of the raion. As part of the administrative reform of Ukraine which reduced the number of raions of Lviv Oblast to seven, Drohobych Municipality was merged into Drohobych Raion.

== Demographics ==
Historical population
Year	Pop.	±%
1931	32,300	—
1956	37,000	+14.6%
1959	42,000	+13.5%
1978	65,998	+57.1%
1989	77,571	+17.5%
2001	79,119	+2.0%
2010	78,368	−0.9%
2022	73,682	−6.0%

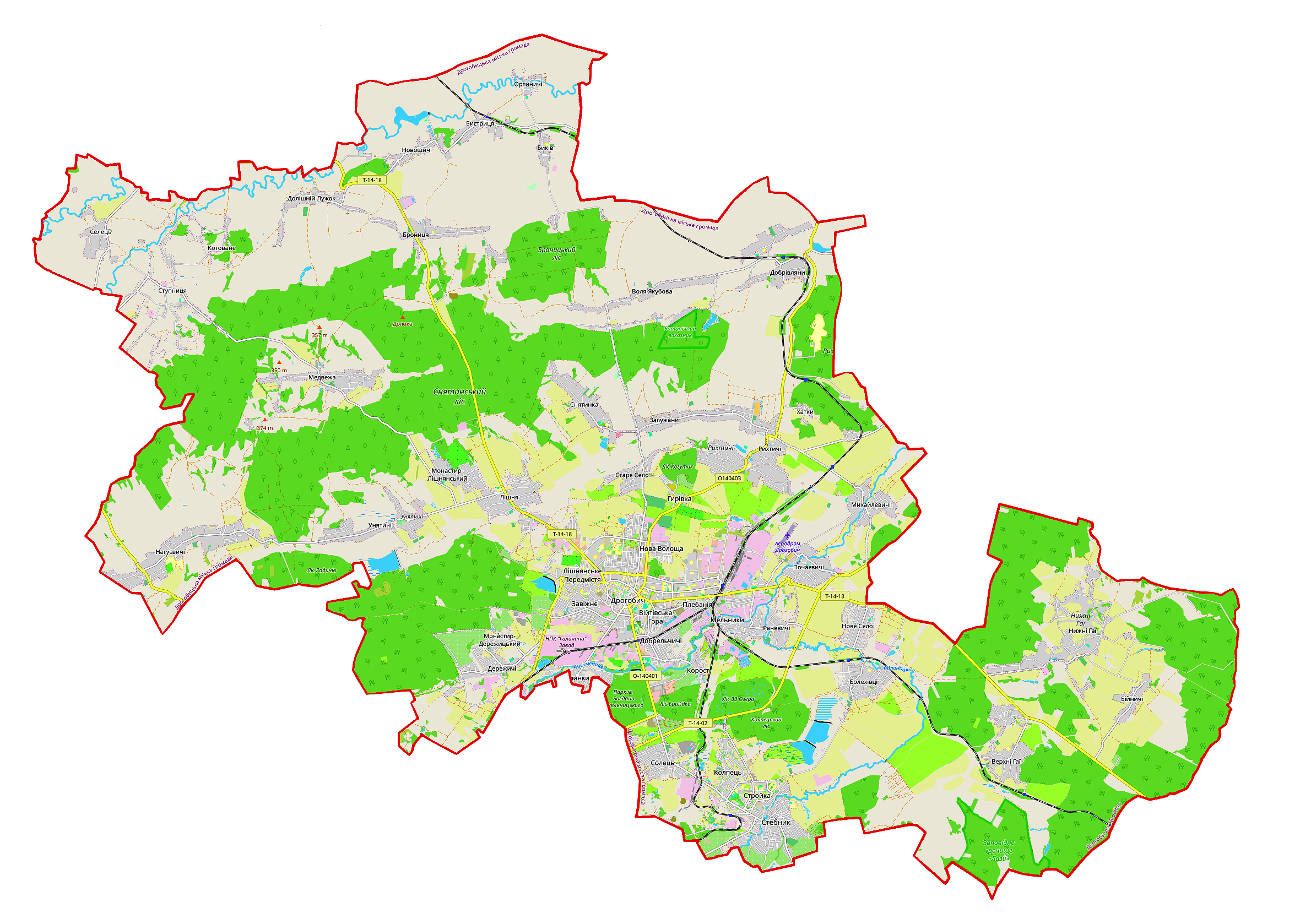
Map of Drohobych urban hromada

Religious and national splits
Mid-18th century By religion	1869 By religion	1939 By religion	1959 By nationality
total 3,737	total 16,880	total 34,600	total 42,000
2,200 (58.8%) Jewish	47.7% Jewish	39.9% Jewish	2% Jews
1,274 (34%) Roman Catholic	23.2% Roman Catholic	33.2% Roman Catholic	3% Poles
263 (7%) Greek Catholic	28.7% Greek Catholic or Orthodox	26.3% Greek Catholic or Orthodox	70% Ukrainians
	28.7% Greek Catholic or Orthodox	26.3% Greek Catholic or Orthodox	22% Russians

2001 census
	percent
Ukrainians	93.98%
Russians	3.91%
Poles	0.46%
Belarusians	0.26%
Gypsies	0.22%
Ashkenazi Jews	0.07%
Germans	0.04%
Moldovans	0.04%

=== Drohobych Raion ===
In 1931, the total population of the Drohobych Raion was 194,456, distributed among various languages:

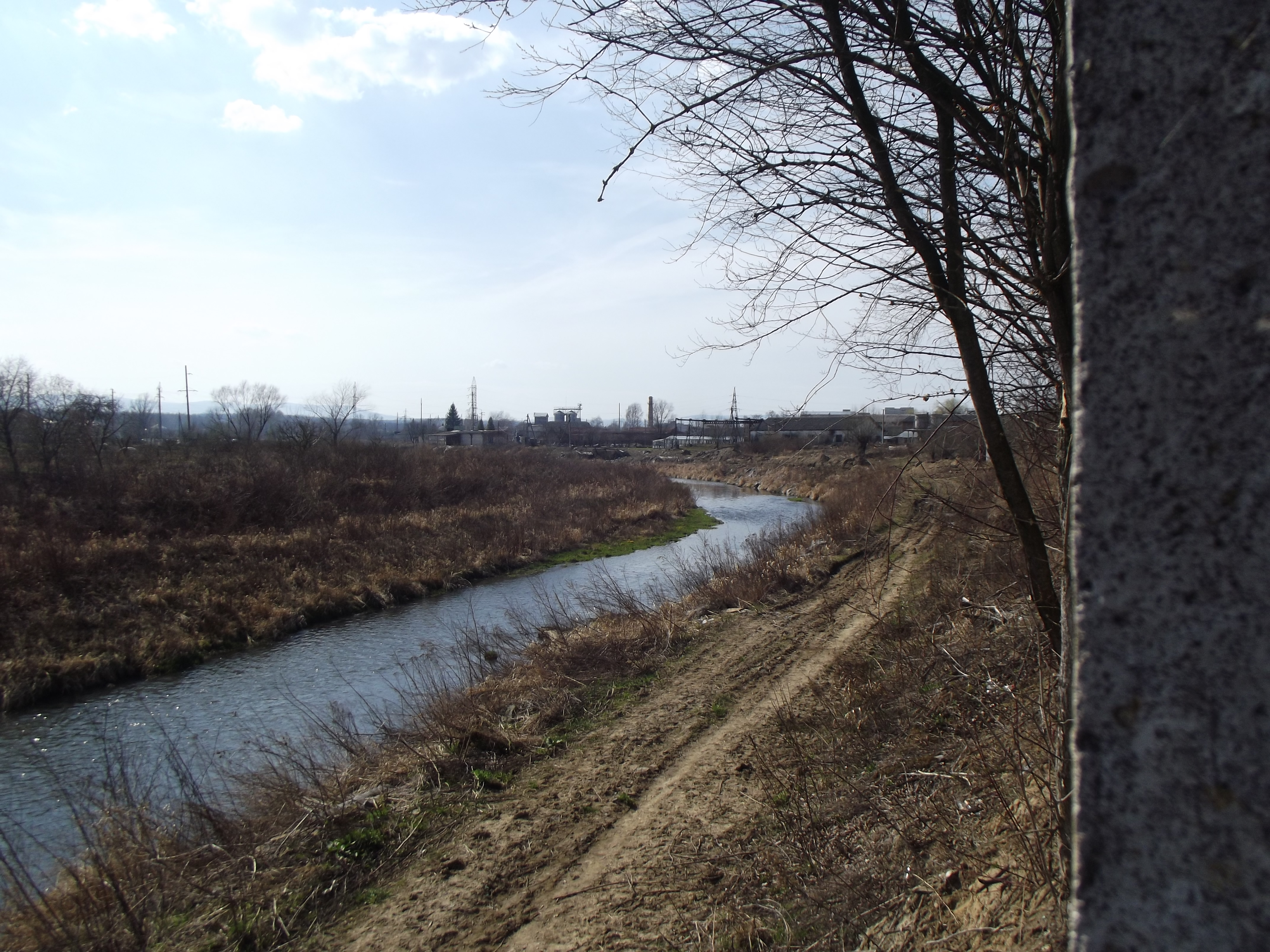
Tysmenytsia river near Drohobych

- Polish: 91,935 (47.3%)
- Ukrainian: 79,214 (40.7%)
- Yiddish: 20,484 (10.5%)

In January 2007, the total population of the metropolitan area was over 103,000 inhabitants.

== Geography ==
Drohobych is located upon the Tysmenytsia river in the Subcarpathia region of Ukraine. The city stands on an upland with heights of 300-400 meters above sea level. The outer part of the Skole Beskids mountain range with heights of over 900 meters separates the valley of Tysmenytsia from the valley of Stryi.

=== Climate ===
Climate data for Drohobych (1981–2010)
Month	Jan	Feb	Mar	Apr	May	Jun	Jul	Aug	Sep	Oct	Nov	Dec	Year
Mean daily maximum °C (°F)	1.1 (34.0)	2.7 (36.9)	7.4 (45.3)	14.3 (57.7)	19.8 (67.6)	22.4 (72.3)	24.4 (75.9)	24.0 (75.2)	19.0 (66.2)	14.0 (57.2)	7.2 (45.0)	2.2 (36.0)	13.2 (55.8)
Daily mean °C (°F)	−2.4 (27.7)	−1.3 (29.7)	2.7 (36.9)	8.5 (47.3)	13.8 (56.8)	16.7 (62.1)	18.6 (65.5)	17.9 (64.2)	13.3 (55.9)	8.5 (47.3)	3.2 (37.8)	−1.1 (30.0)	8.2 (46.8)
Mean daily minimum °C (°F)	−5.9 (21.4)	−5.1 (22.8)	−1.5 (29.3)	3.0 (37.4)	7.5 (45.5)	11.0 (51.8)	13.0 (55.4)	12.1 (53.8)	8.2 (46.8)	3.9 (39.0)	−0.3 (31.5)	−4.4 (24.1)	3.5 (38.3)
Average precipitation mm (inches)	27.8 (1.09)	34.4 (1.35)	38.8 (1.53)	55.7 (2.19)	92.2 (3.63)	105.8 (4.17)	107.7 (4.24)	85.2 (3.35)	73.9 (2.91)	51.6 (2.03)	38.0 (1.50)	35.9 (1.41)	747.0 (29.41)
Average precipitation days (≥ 1.0 mm)	7.7	8.4	8.3	9.0	11.3	12.4	11.5	9.2	8.8	7.8	8.1	8.7	111.2
Average relative humidity (%)	80.0	78.9	75.5	72.2	75.3	76.6	76.7	78.2	80.3	80.4	82.5	82.4	78.3
Source: World Meteorological Organization

== Economy ==
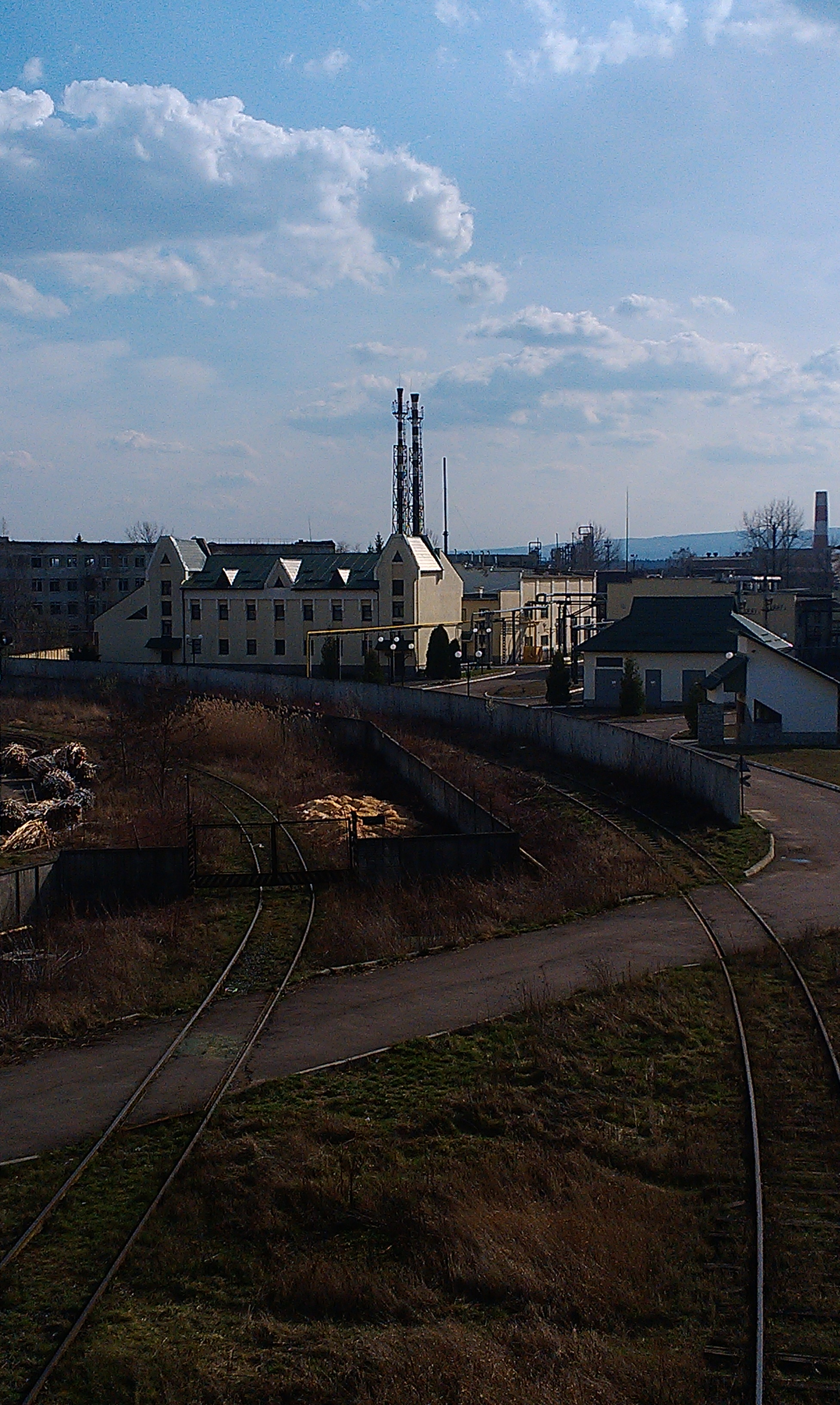
Drohobych oil refinery

Drohobych is part of the Drohobych-Boryslav industrial area, which represents the oldest and most important oil basin in Ukraine. The area is known for its reserves of oil, ozokerite, salt and natural gas. Oil exploitation in the area started during the 1850s. In 1909 a major oil refinery was established in Drohobych. Before WW2 the enterprise was one of the biggest of its type in Europe, processing over 30,000 cisterns of oil annually. Oil was supplied by pipelines from nearby Boryslav, and gas supplies were organized from Dashava. There were also wood processing and ceramics factories in the city.

Industries currently based in Drohobych include saltworks, oil refineries, chemicals, machinery, metallurgy, and food processing. Drohobych has rich salt deposits and for that reason salt is one of the most popular symbols of the city and is depicted on its emblem.

== Education ==
=== Universities ===
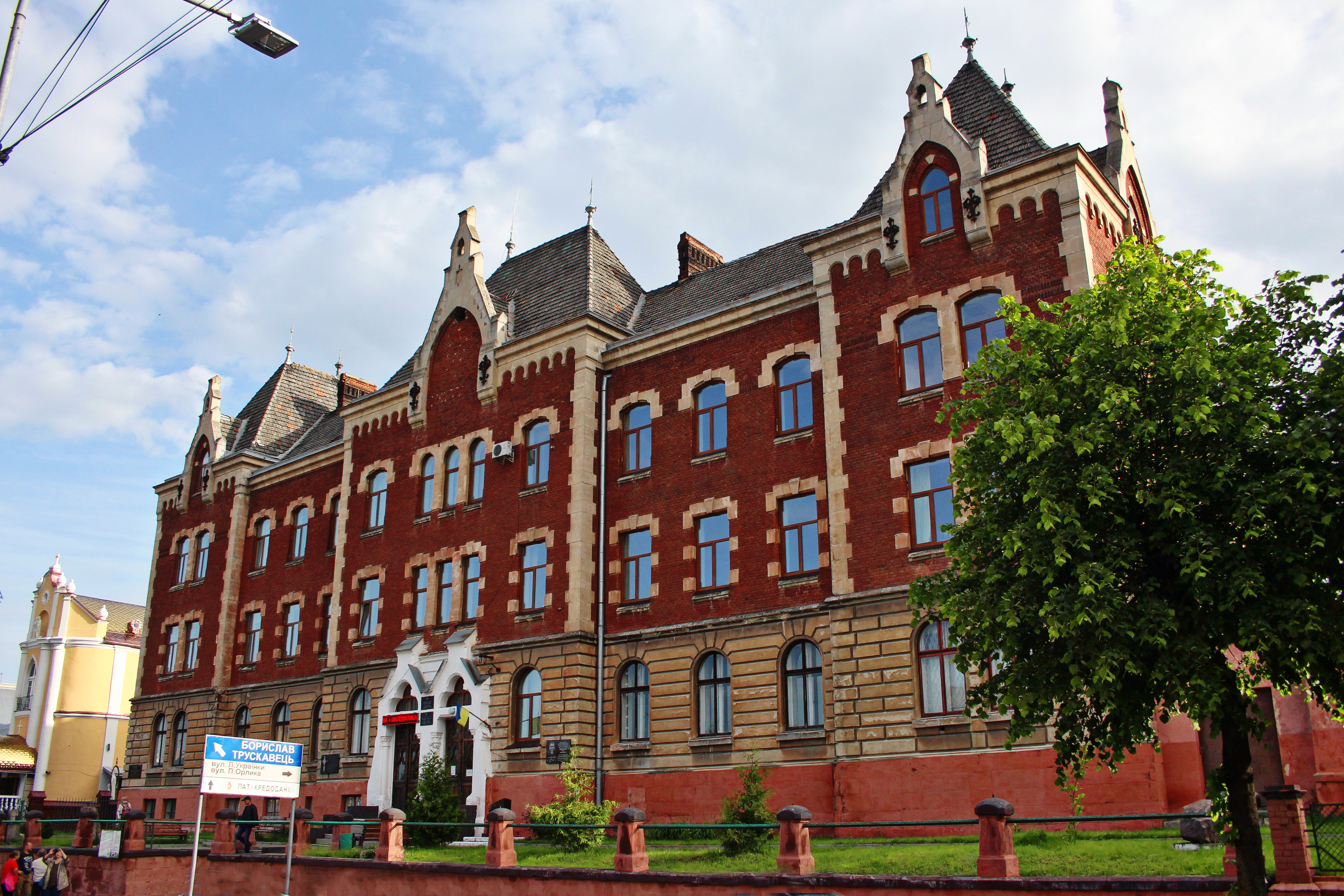
One of the buildings of Drohobych Pedagogical University

- Drohobych State Pedagogical University of Ivan Franko
- Donetsk National Technical University since 2024; temporarily moved from Donetsk Oblast due to the Russo-Ukrainian War

=== Colleges ===
- Drohobych Mechanical Technological College
- Drohobych Petroleum and Gas College

== Sport ==
The city was home to one of Poland's best pre-war football clubs; Junak Drohobycz. It was disbanded in 1939 due to the Soviet invasion of Poland.

Halychyna Drohobych, founded in 1989 as Naftovyk Drohobych currently represents the city.

== Sights ==
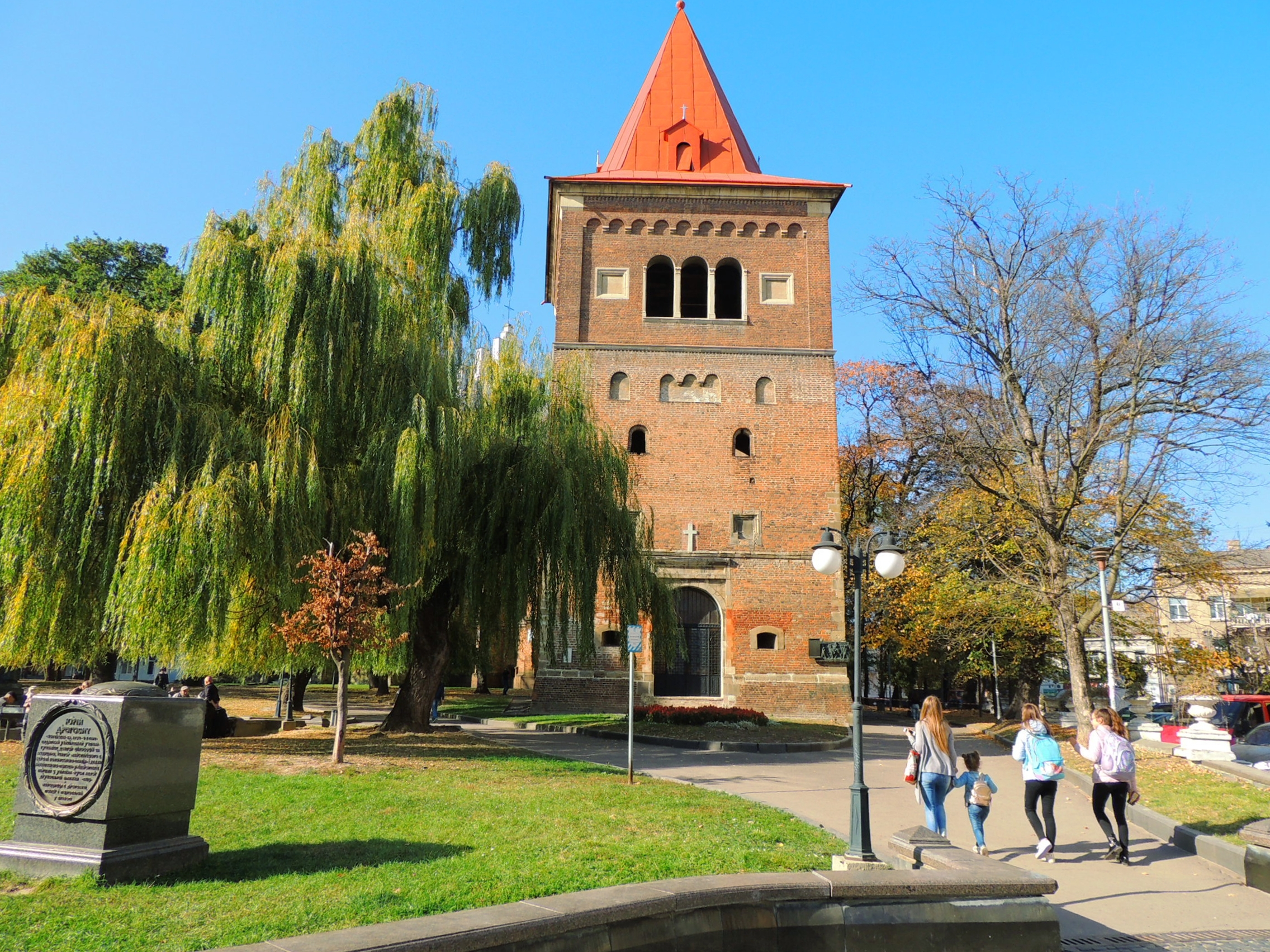
A former castle tower

- St. George's Church (c. 1500)
- St. Bartholomew Church (1392–16th century)
- its bell tower, former castle tower (late 13th century and 15th century)
- Ascension Church (late 15th century)
- Holy Cross Church (early 16th century)
- Choral Synagogue (1842–1865)
- Progressive Synagogue
- Town Hall (1920s)
- St. Peter's and Paul's Monastery
- Drohobych salt plant (in continuous operation since at least 1390; buildings of 19th–20th centuries)
- Drohobych Museum
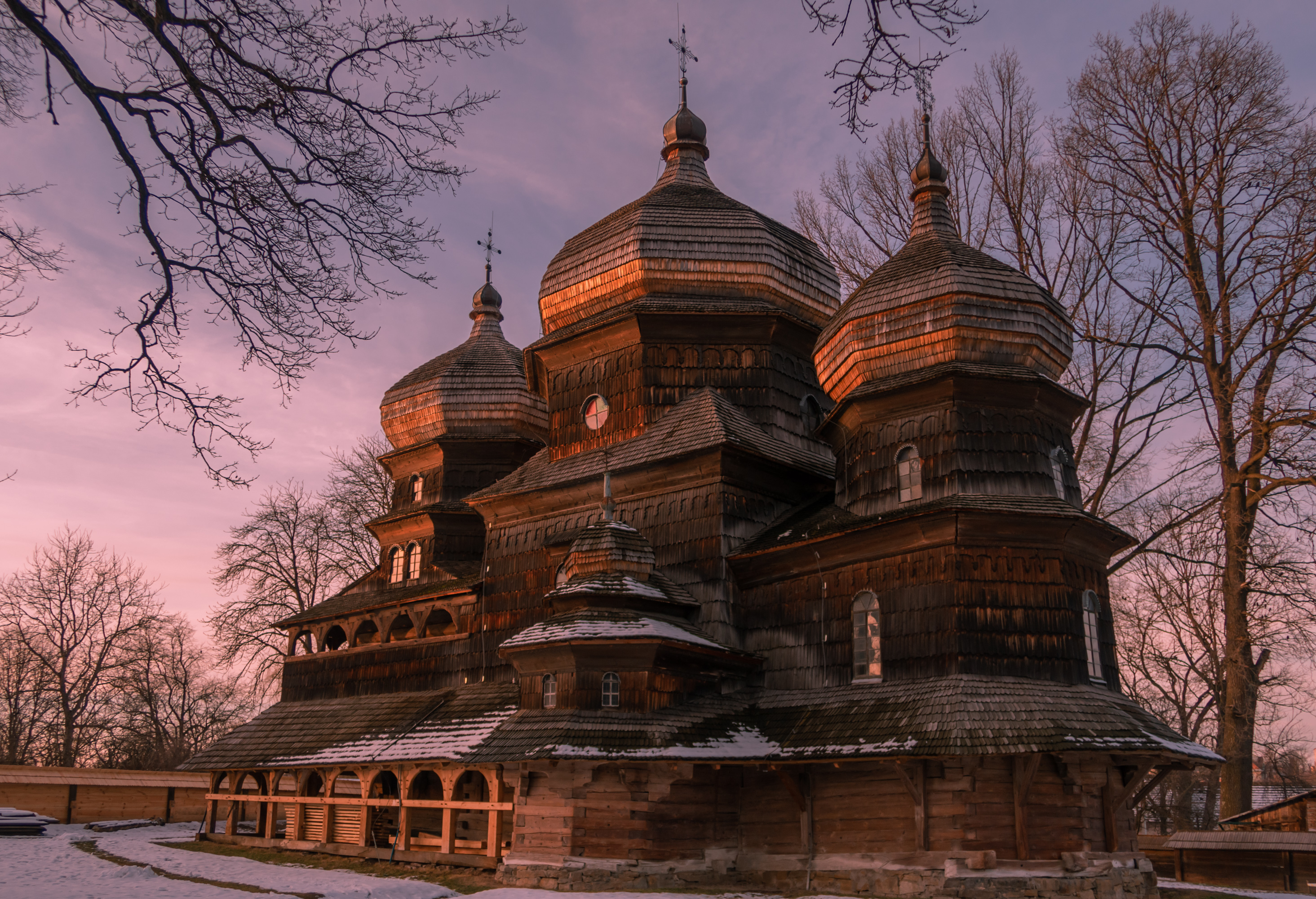
St. George's Church, 16th–17th centuries

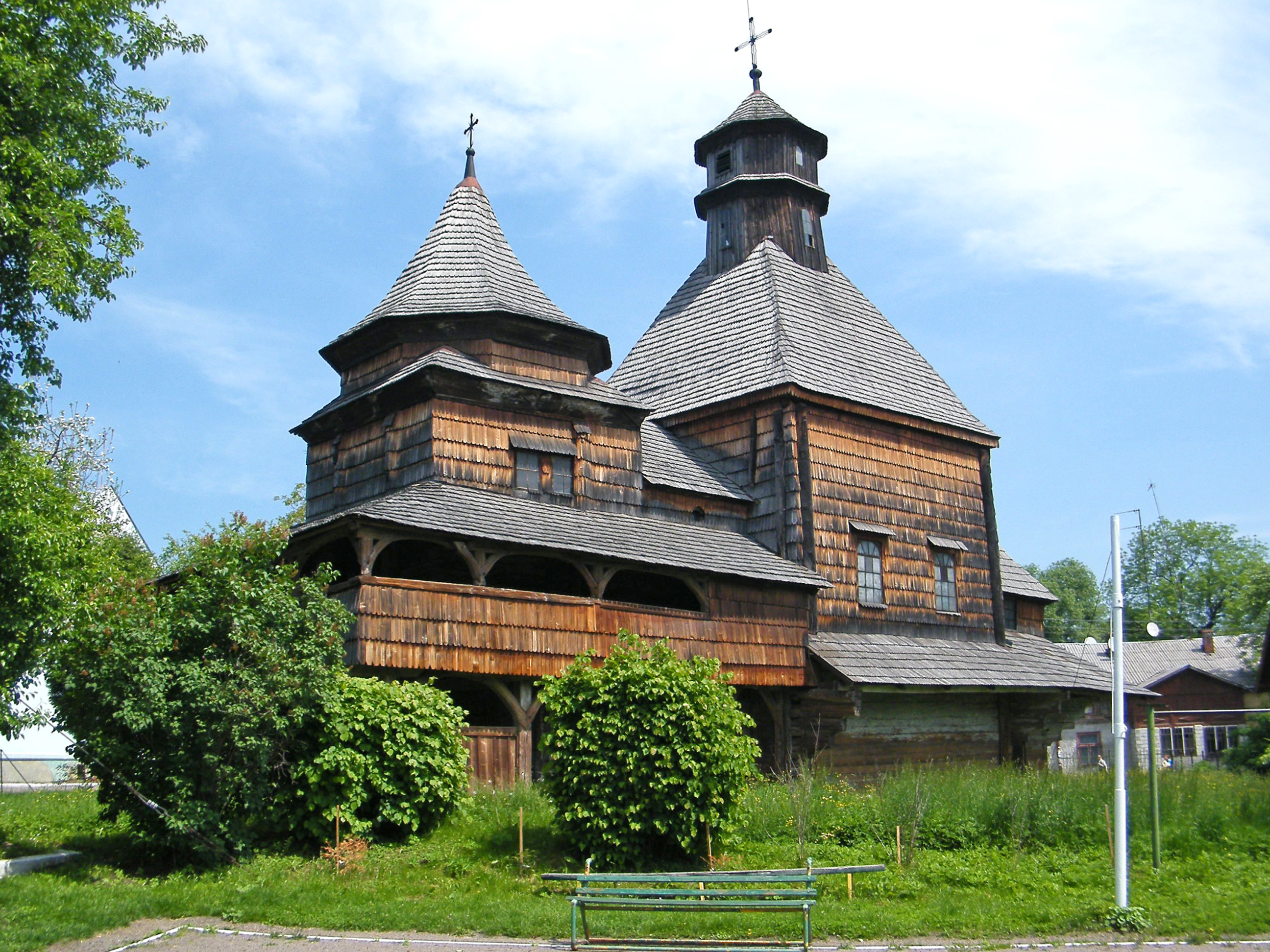
Church of the Holy Cross, 1613–1661

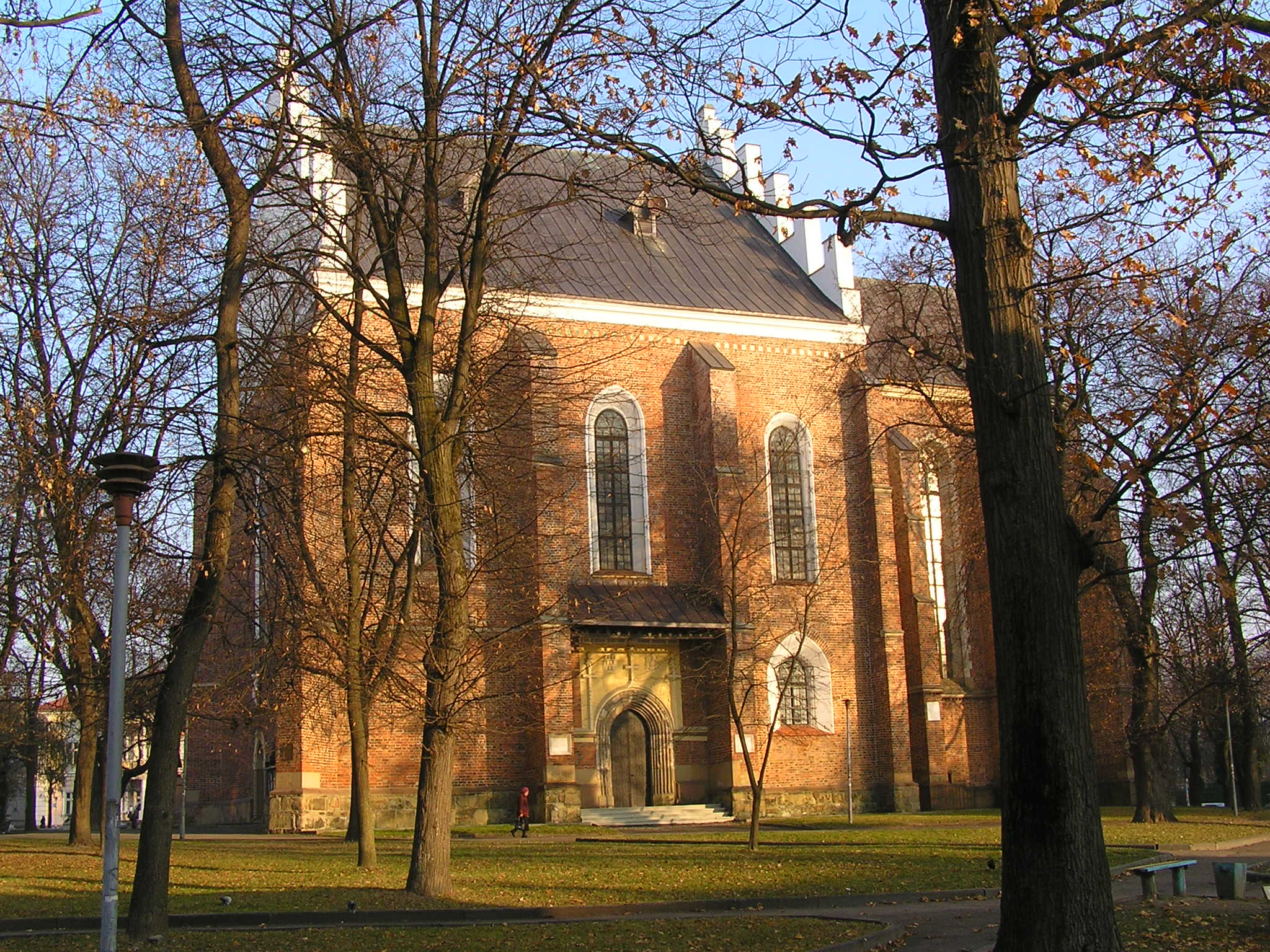
Brick Gothic St. Bartholomew Church (14th–16th centuries) and its bell tower

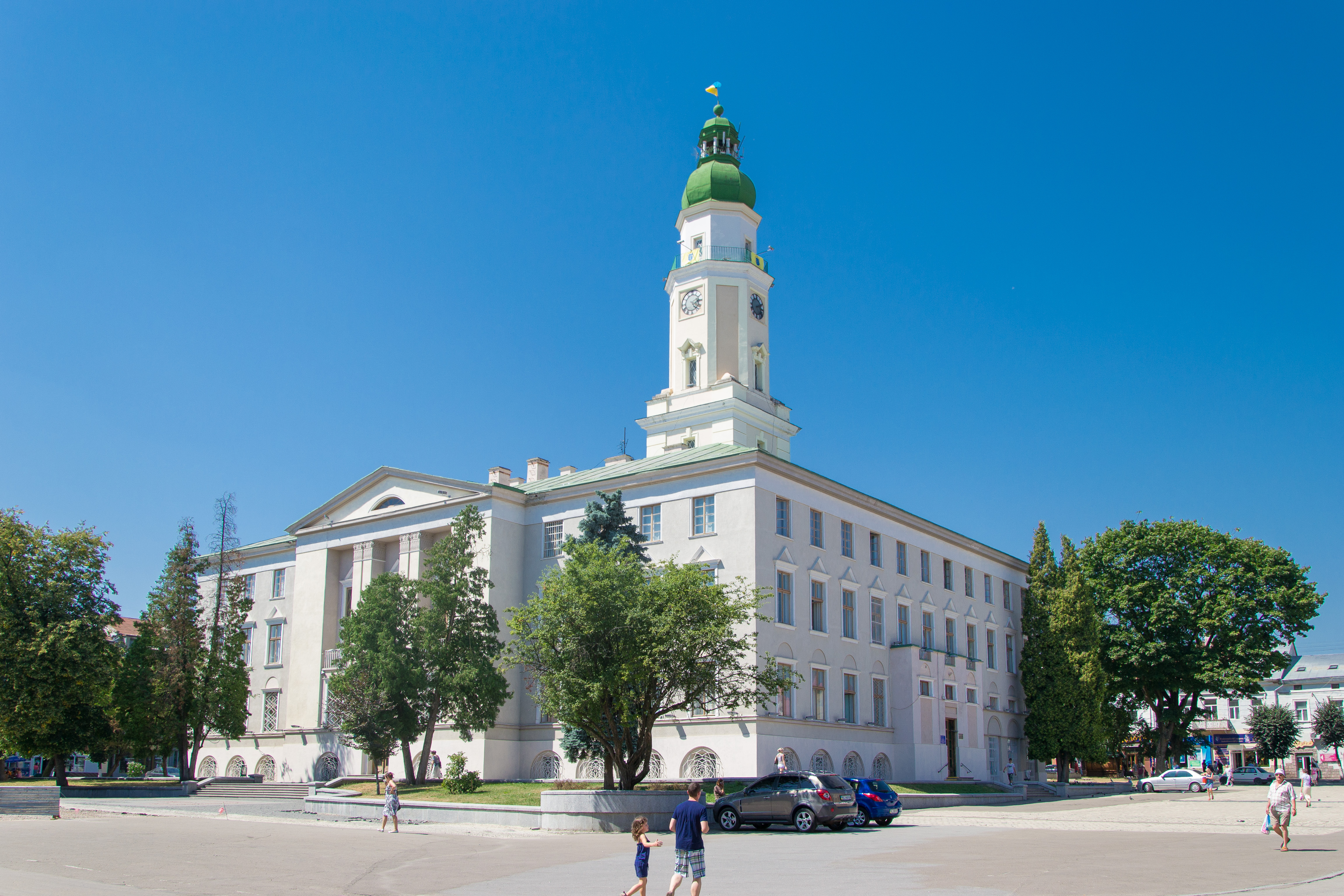
Town Hall

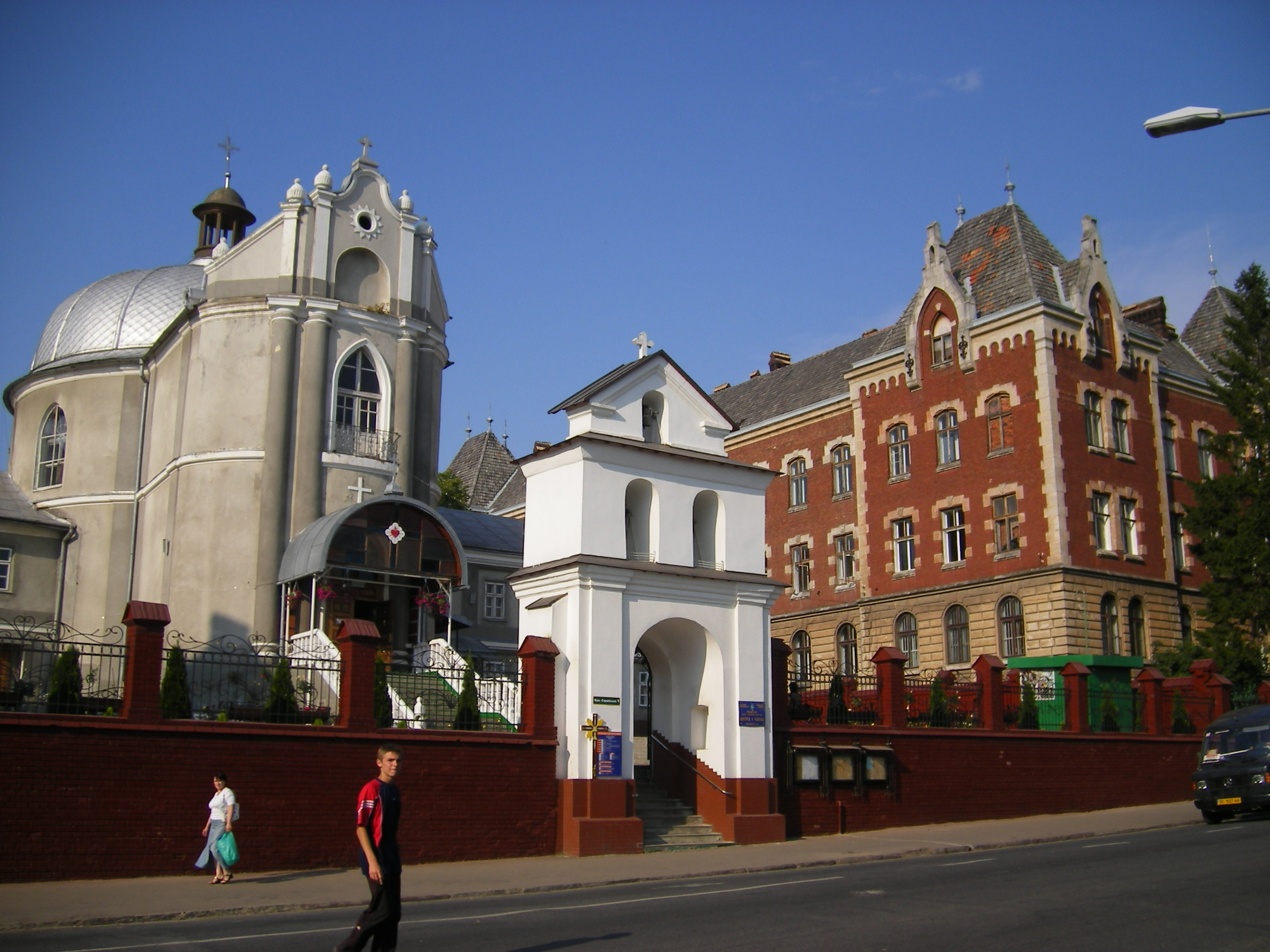
Basilian monastery of Saints Peter and Paul, 1825–1828

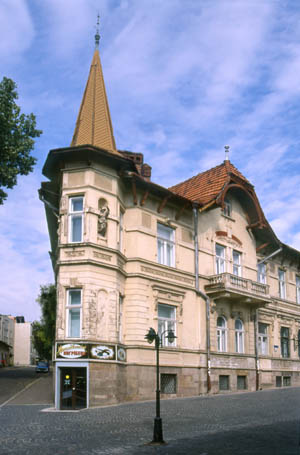
A historic building

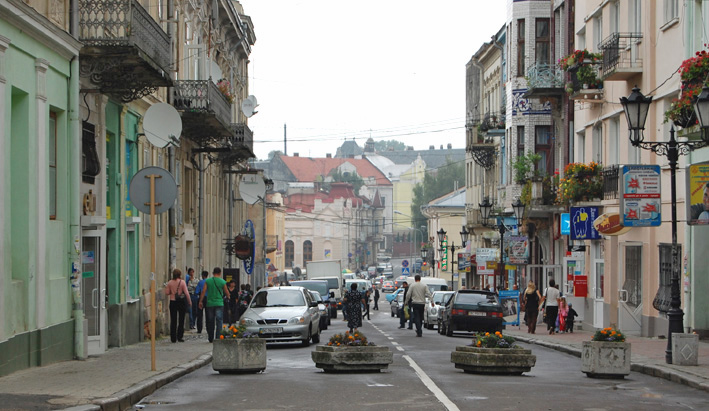
Mazepa Street

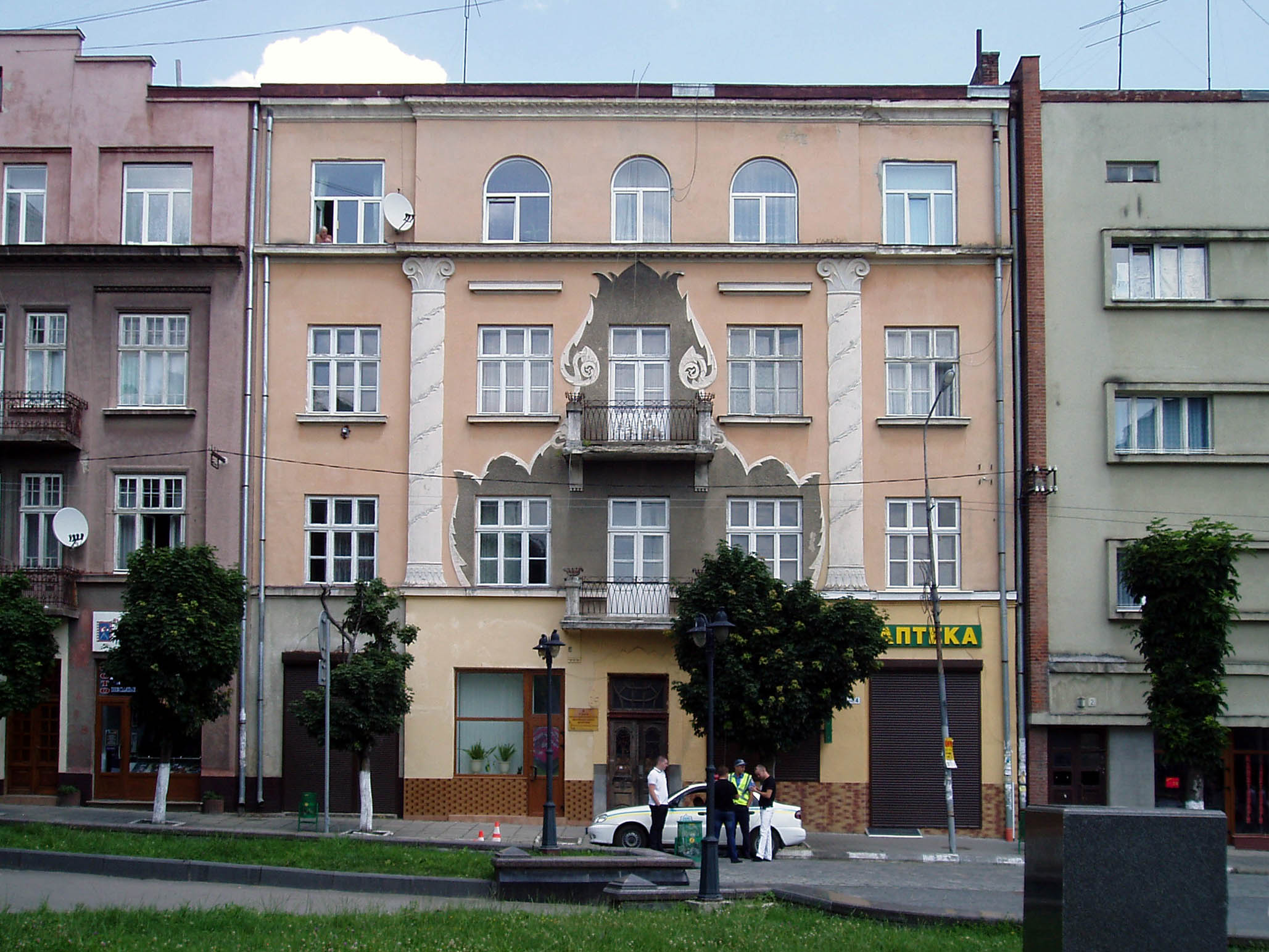
Osmomysla Street

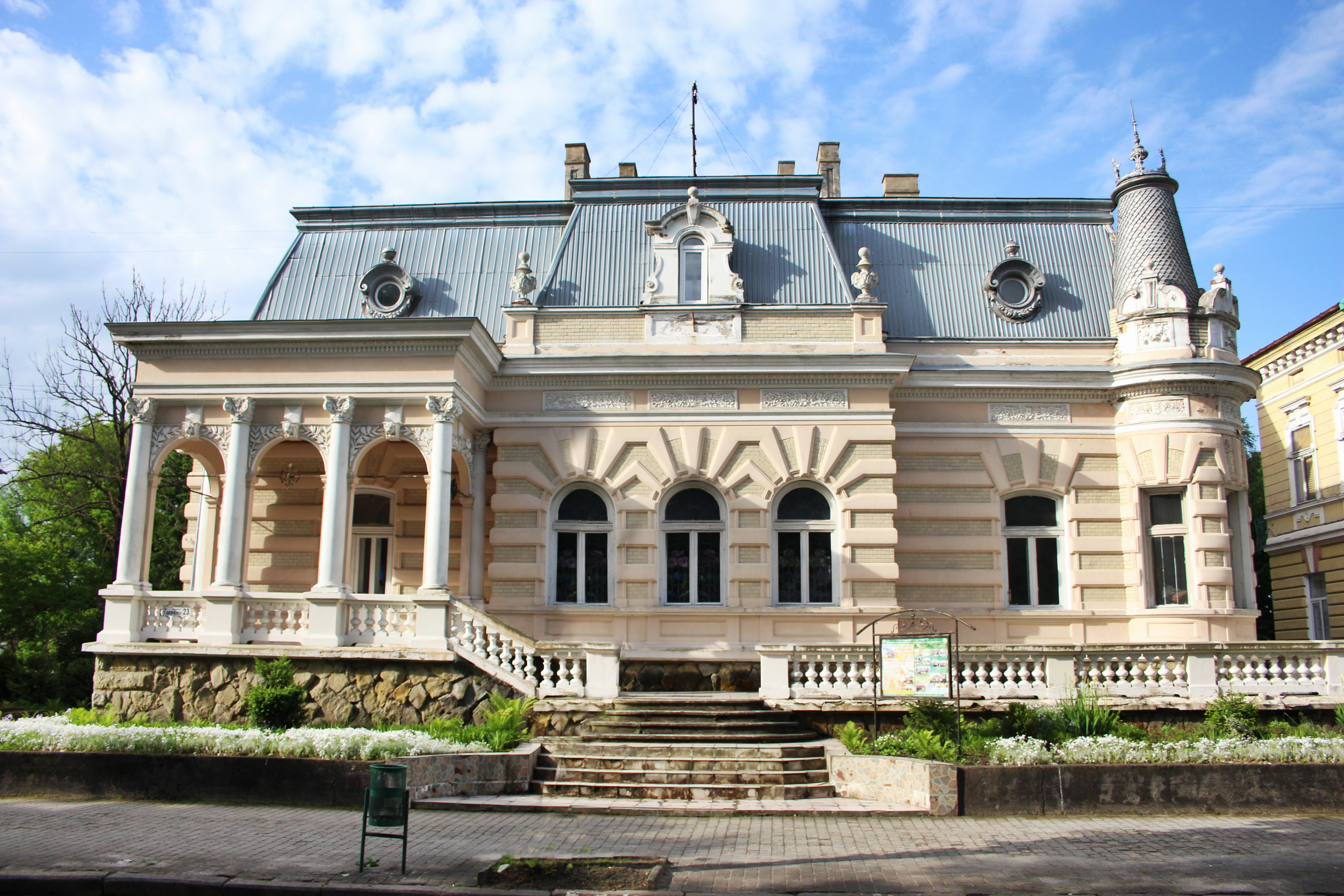
Villa of Raymond Jarosz

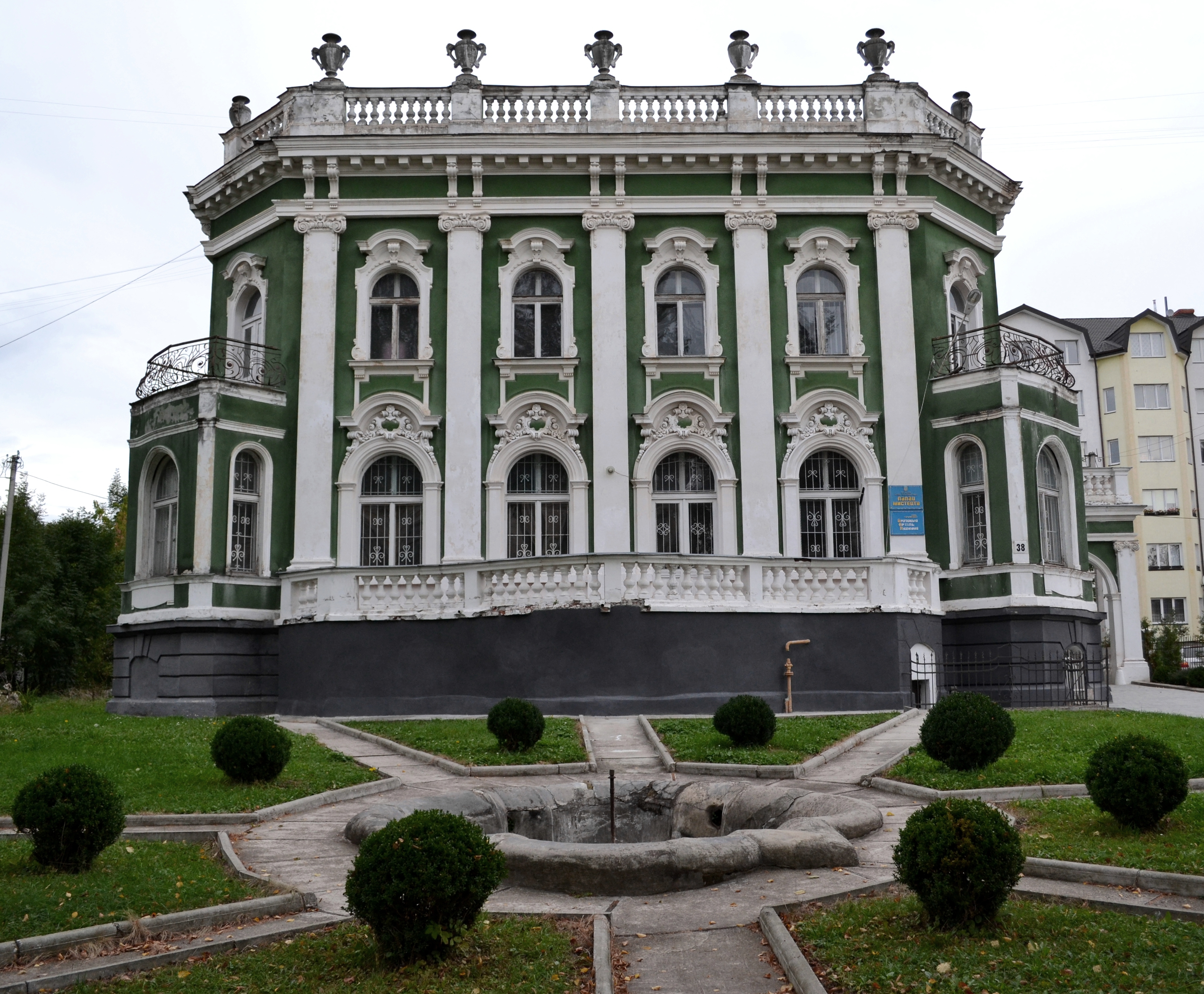
Bianka Villa

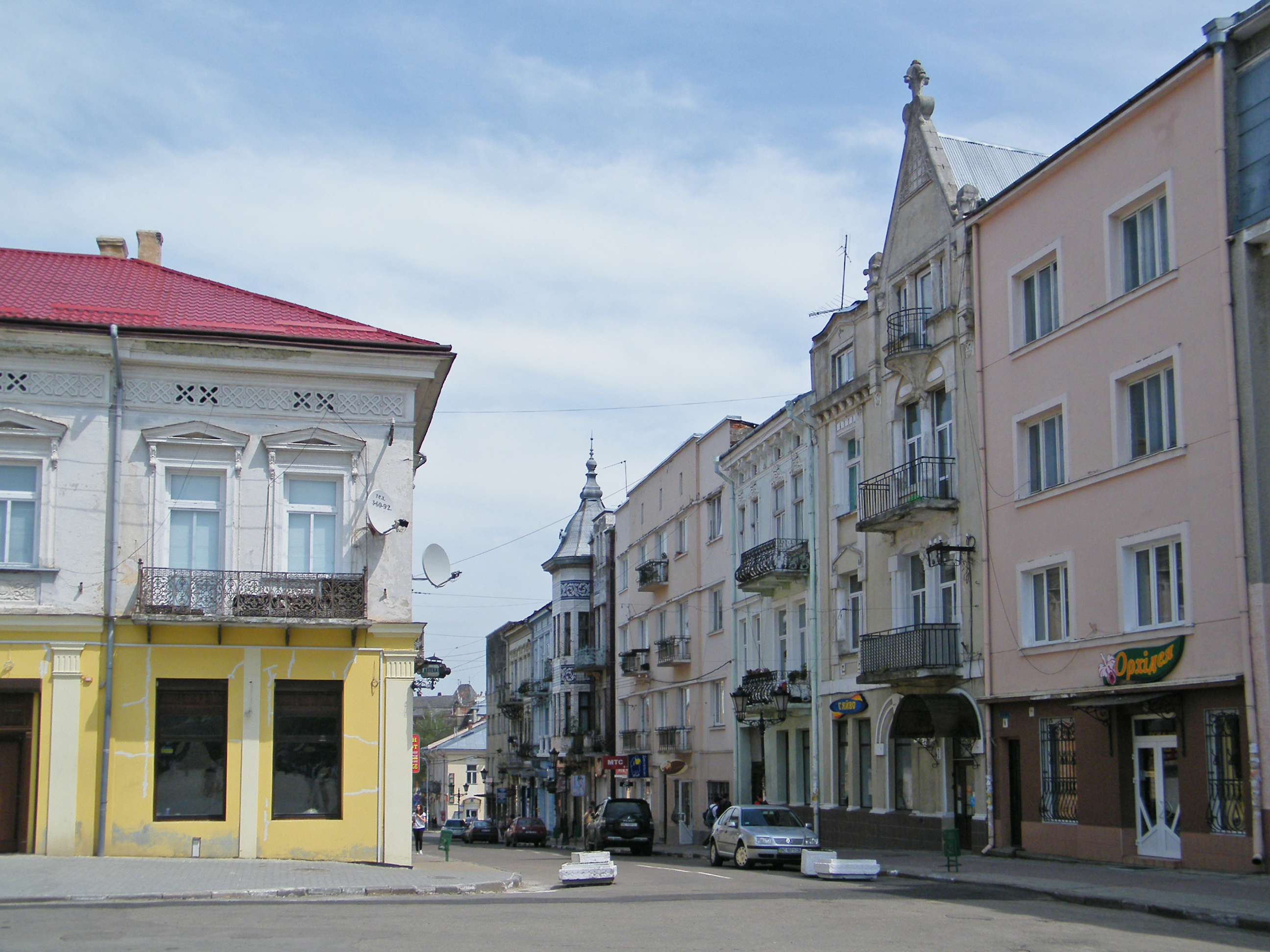
Shevska Street

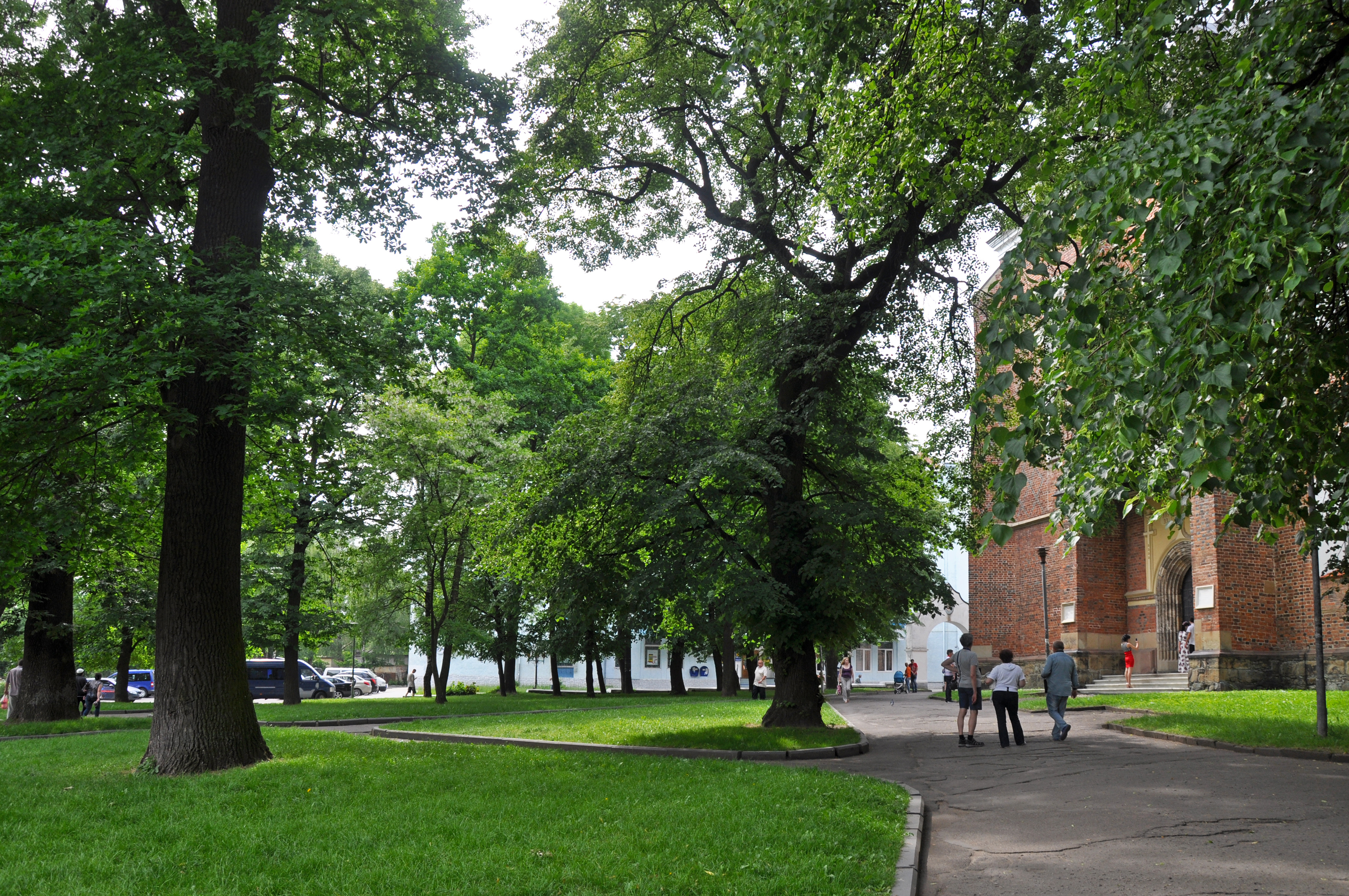
City Park, 19th century

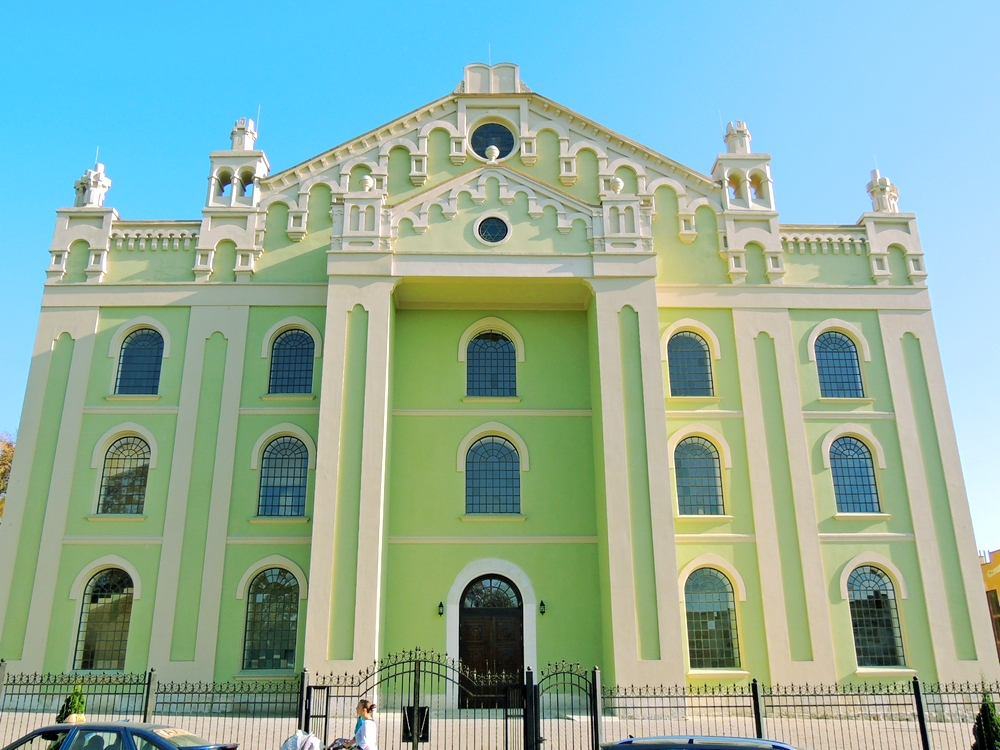
Until 1918, the Choral Synagogue had been the central synagogue of Galicia and Lodomeria

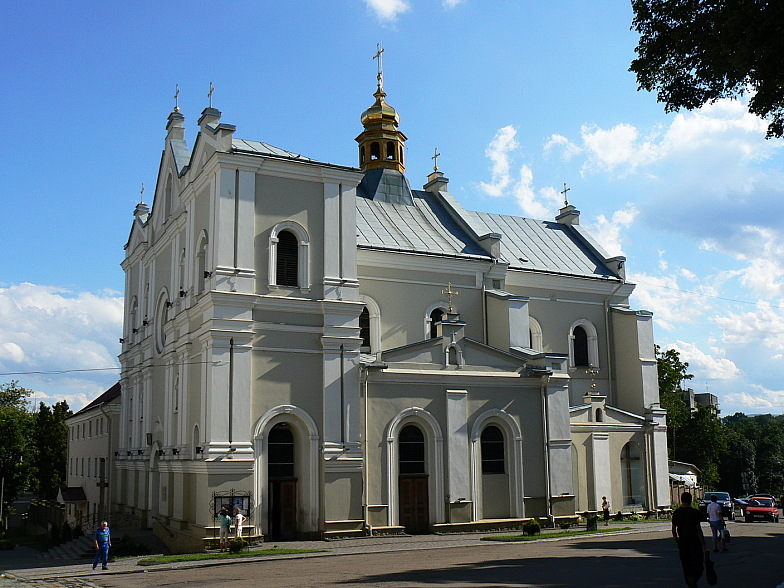
Holy Trinity Cathedral

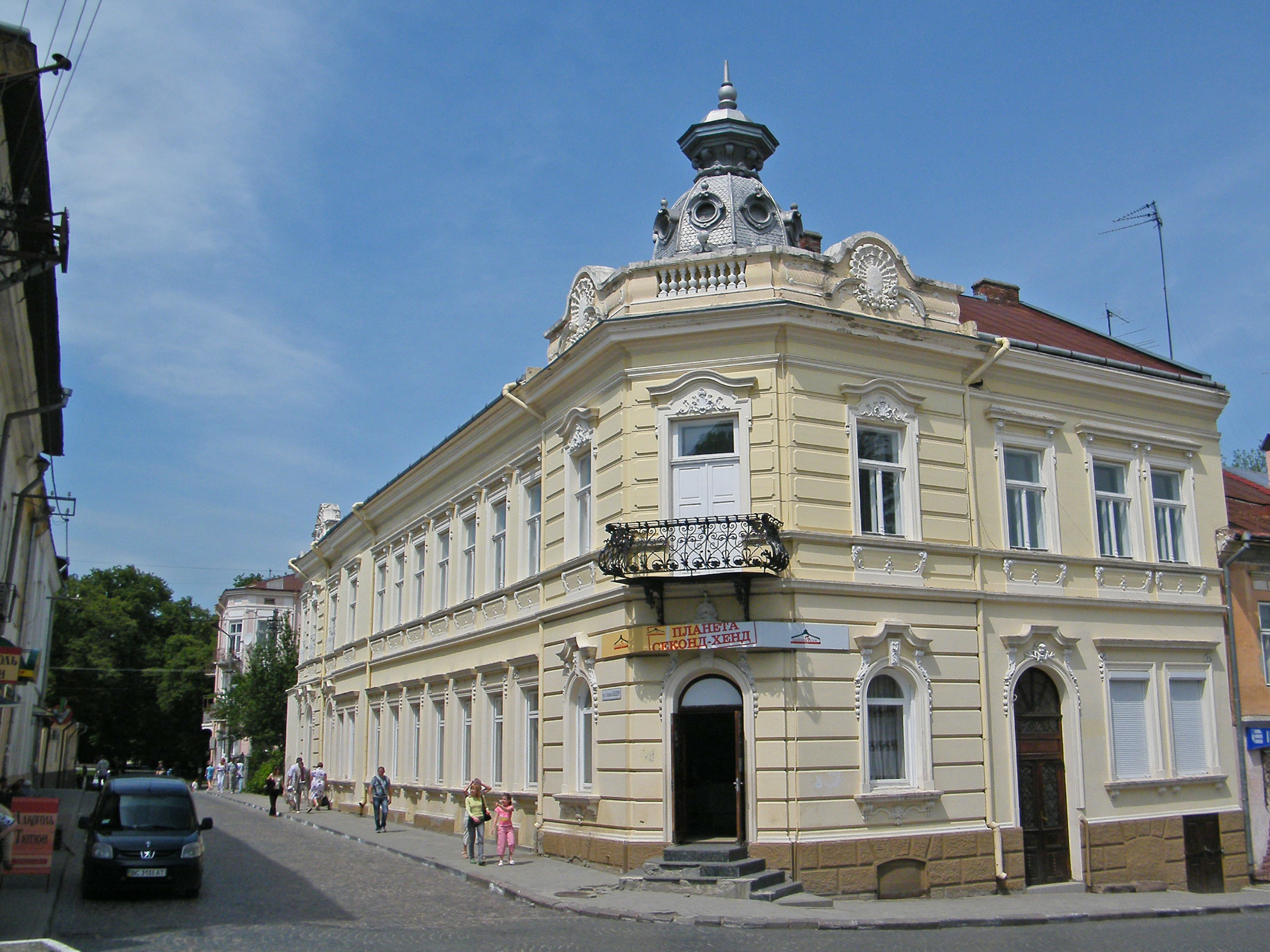
A historic building

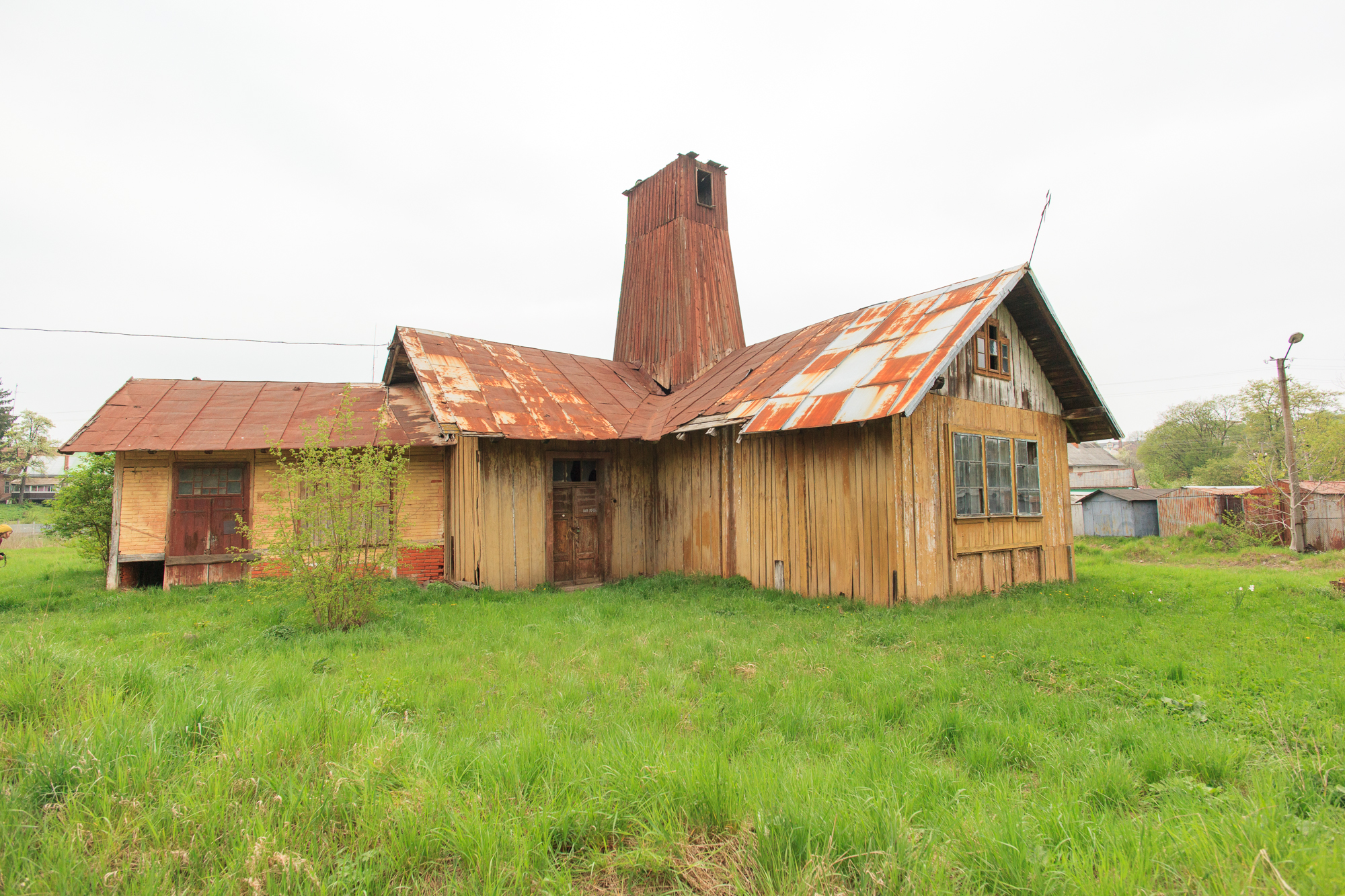
Old mine of the Drohobych salt plant, 1875

== Notable people ==
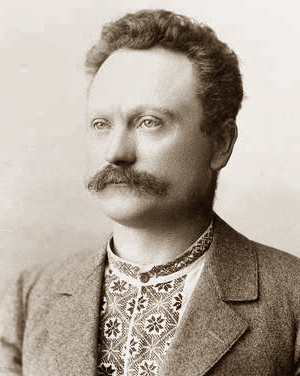
Ivan Franko

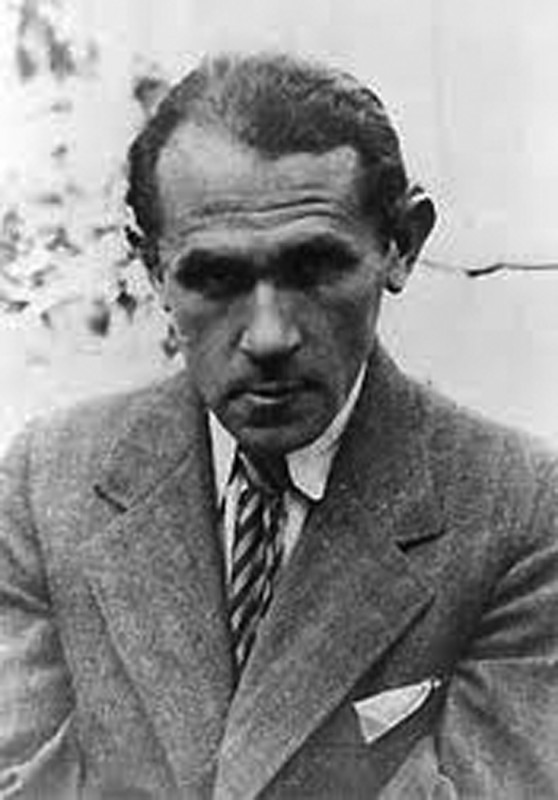
Bruno Schulz

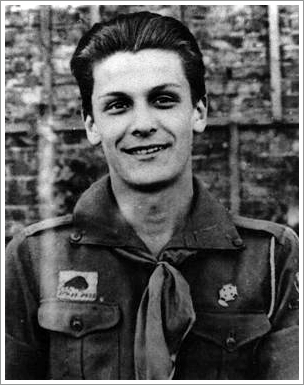
Maciej Aleksy Dawidowski "Alek"

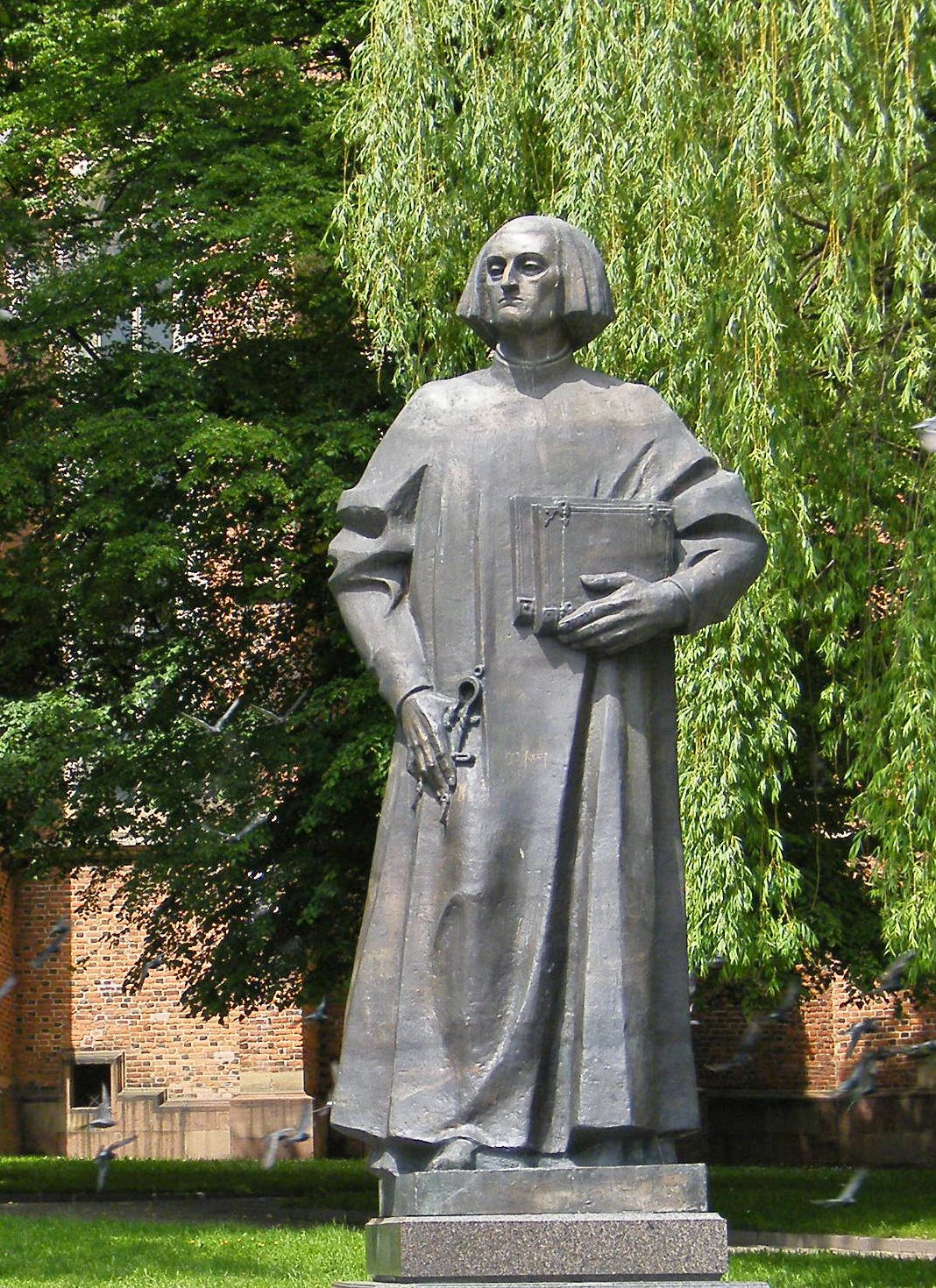
Yuriy Drohobych monument

=== Politics ===
- Semen Vityk, Ukrainian politician and trade union leader (born near Drohobych)
- Zenon Kossak, Ukrainian military and political leader (born here)
- Andriy Melnyk, Ukrainian military and political leader (born near Drohobych)
- David Horowitz (economist), Israeli economist and the first Governor of the Bank of Israel.
- Leon Reich (1879–1929), lawyer and member of the Sejm of Poland (born here)

=== Arts ===
- Elisabeth Bergner, Oscar-nominated Austrian-British stage and screen actress
- Ivan Franko, Ukrainian poet and writer, born in Nahuievychi, near Drohobych
- Irene Frisch, Jewish-Polish-American writer and memoirist, Holocaust survivor saved by a Polish woman named Franciszka Sobkowa
- Leopold Gottlieb, Polish-Jewish painter
- Maurycy Gottlieb, Polish-Jewish painter
- Diana Reiter, Polish-Jewish architect, victim of Holocaust
- Ephraim Moses Lilien, Jewish-Zionist painter
- Alfred Schreyer, Polish-Jewish vocalist and violinist
- Bruno Schulz, Polish-Jewish writer, graphic artist, and literary critic
- Paula Szalit, Polish-Jewish pianist, composer and child prodigy
- Kazimierz Wierzyński, Polish poet and writer
- Khrystyna Soloviy, Ukrainian singer

=== Other fields ===
- Maciej Aleksy Dawidowski "Alek", Polish anti-Nazi resistance fighter, and one of the main protagonists in a classic Polish non-fiction war novel Stones for the Rampart by Aleksander Kamiński
- Tadeusz Chciuk-Celt, Polish war hero
- Yuriy Drohobych, first doctor of medicine in Ukraine, 1481–1482 rector of the University of Bologna
- Hryhoriy Kossak, Ukrainian military officer
- Yaroslav Popovych, Ukrainian cyclist (born here)
- Józef Schreier, Polish-Jewish mathematician
- Viktor Vekselberg, Russian oligarch

=== Righteous Among the Nations (Rescuers of Jews in Drohobych) ===
On the Polish list of Righteous Among the Nations:

- Józef and Maria Baumgarten
- Bronisława and Aleksander Bobatow and their children: Janusz, Henriette (later Siegman), and Irena (later Staats)
- Lola Engel (murdered by the Germans for helping Jews)
- Marian Kędzierski and his daughter Krystyna
- Maria Korona and her son Zbigniew
- Kazimiera Kwaśniewska
- Rozalia Makara and her son Marian
- Włodzimierz Maruczyński
- Władysław Pańczyszyn
- Władysława Peska
- Jan and Maria Pysk and their son Roman (they hid 48 people)
- Franciszka Sobkowa
- Maria Antonina Strutyńska (murdered by the Germans for helping Jews) and her daughter Teresa (later Christów)
- Anna Tomczak-Hornung
- Tomasz and Olga Wolski
- Izydor Wołosiański and Jarosława Wołosiańska (they hid 39 people)
- Edward and Stefania Wróblewski
- Julian and Józefa Zając

On the Ukrainian list of Righteous Among the Nations:

- Stepan and Yuliya Kupchan
- Taras Shniatynsky

== Twin towns and sister cities ==
Drohobych is twinned with:

City	Country	Since
Bytom	Poland	
Buffalo, New York	(United States) USA	2000
Dębica	Poland	
Legnica	Poland	
Muscatine, Iowa	(United States) USA	
Olecko	Poland	
Smiltene	Latvia	
