= Irene Frisch =

American writer

Irene Frisch (born Irene Bienstock; May 3, 1931 – November 7, 2021) was an American writer who wrote many articles and stories about her childhood in Poland, surviving the Holocaust, living in Israel and then in the United States.

== Life and career ==
Irene Frisch was born in Drohobycz, Poland (now Ukraine) and survived the Holocaust in hiding. She was the daughter of Israel and Sarah Bienstock. She, her sister Pola and mother were hidden for two and a half years in the apartment of Frania Sobkowa, a woman who was the girls' nanny before the war. Irene's story "My Christmas Story" is about the night Ms. Sobkowa rescued her from the Drohobycz Ghetto in 1941.

After liberation, Irene lived in Poland, Germany, Israel and since 1960 the New York metropolitan area. She attended high school in Poland and college at the University of Heidelberg (Germany) and Hebrew University in Jerusalem. She also obtained a master's degree in Library Science from Columbia University (New York). She was married for 50 years to the late Eugene Frisch and had two children and four grandchildren.

Her stories were published in the book Give Me The Children, co-written with her sister Pola Arbiser. Her stories were also published in newspapers and magazines including The New York Post, and the book Chicken Soup for the Jewish Soul.
