= Ivano-Frankivsk National Technical University of Oil and Gas =

Public university in Ivano-Frankivsk, Ukraine

Coordinates: 48.9293°N 24.6964°E

- Івано-Франківський національний технічний університет нафти і газу
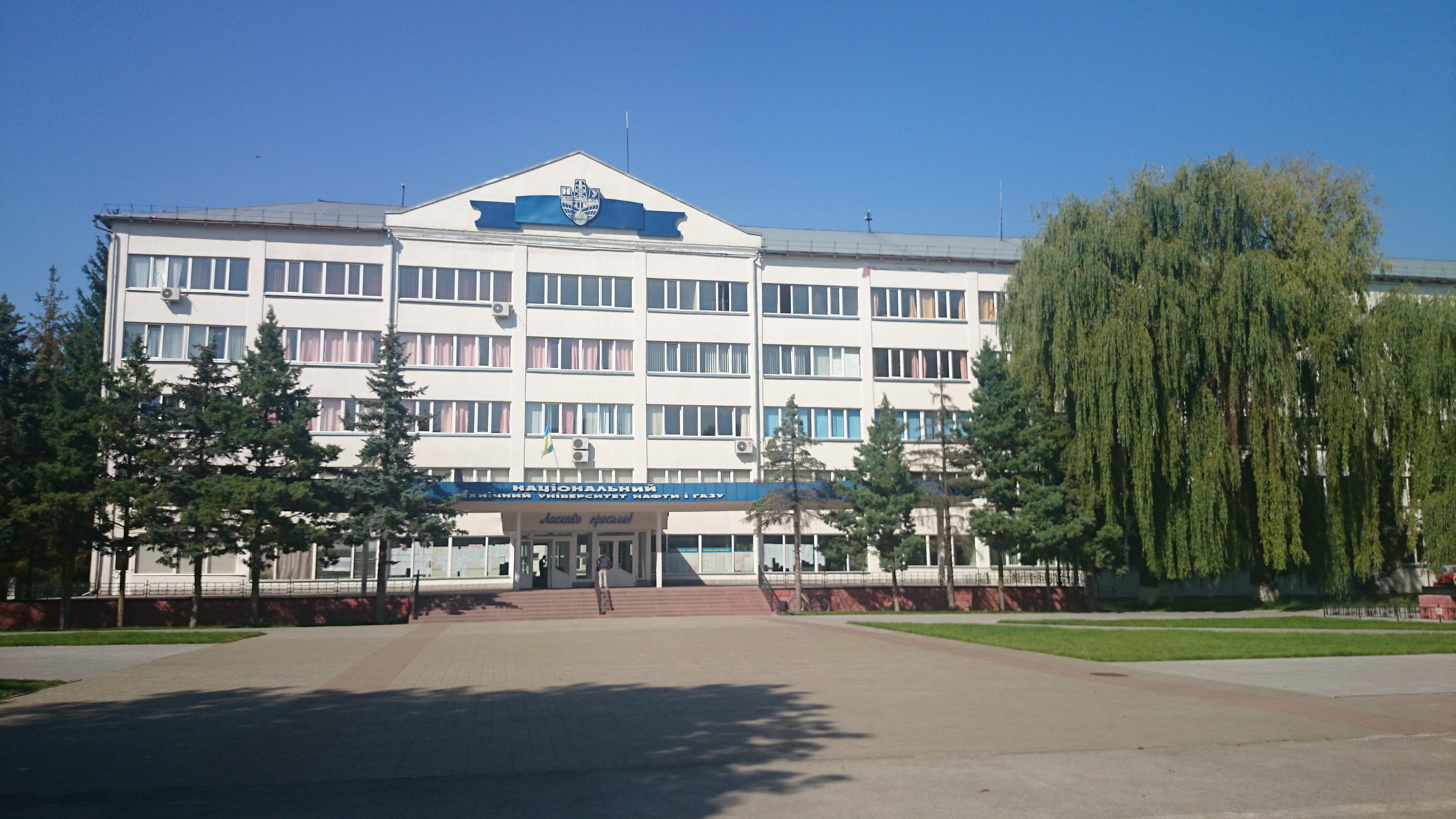
- Established: 1967
- Affiliations: Ministry of Education and Science of Ukraine
- Rector: Yevstakhii Kryzhanivskyi
- Students: 10 000
- Location: Ivano-Frankivsk, Ukraine
- Website: nung.edu.ua

University rankings

Regional – Overall
- QS Emerging Europe and Central Asia: 351-400 (2022)

The Ivano-Frankivsk National Technical University of Oil and Gas (Ukrainian: Івано-Франківський національний технічний університет нафти і газу) is an institution of higher education in Ivano-Frankivsk, Ukraine.

Since its establishment in 1967, the university has been known for preparing qualified and experienced specialists for the oil and gas industries. However, it has expanded to offer education in economics, management and law that is directly related to the needs of energy industry.

Ivano-Frankivsk Oil and Gas University has a two-pronged approach toward education of its students: in the classrooms and in the field. In the classroom, students are provided the theoretical knowledge. Then, by working at university "field-classrooms" or by holding internships with regional businesses and organizations, the future specialists gain practical experience.

== Structure ==
=== Colleges/Faculties ===
- College of automatics and computer science
- College of electrification and information-measurement technologies
- College of economics and entrepreneurship
- College of oil-gas logistics
- College of management and informational activities
- College of management of industrial and regional economical development
- College of architecture of tourist complexes
- Gas-oil industrial College
- Geological investigatory College
- Engineer-ecological College
- Mechanical College

== See also ==
- FC Fakel Ivano-Frankivsk
- List of universities in Ukraine
