= History of Lviv =

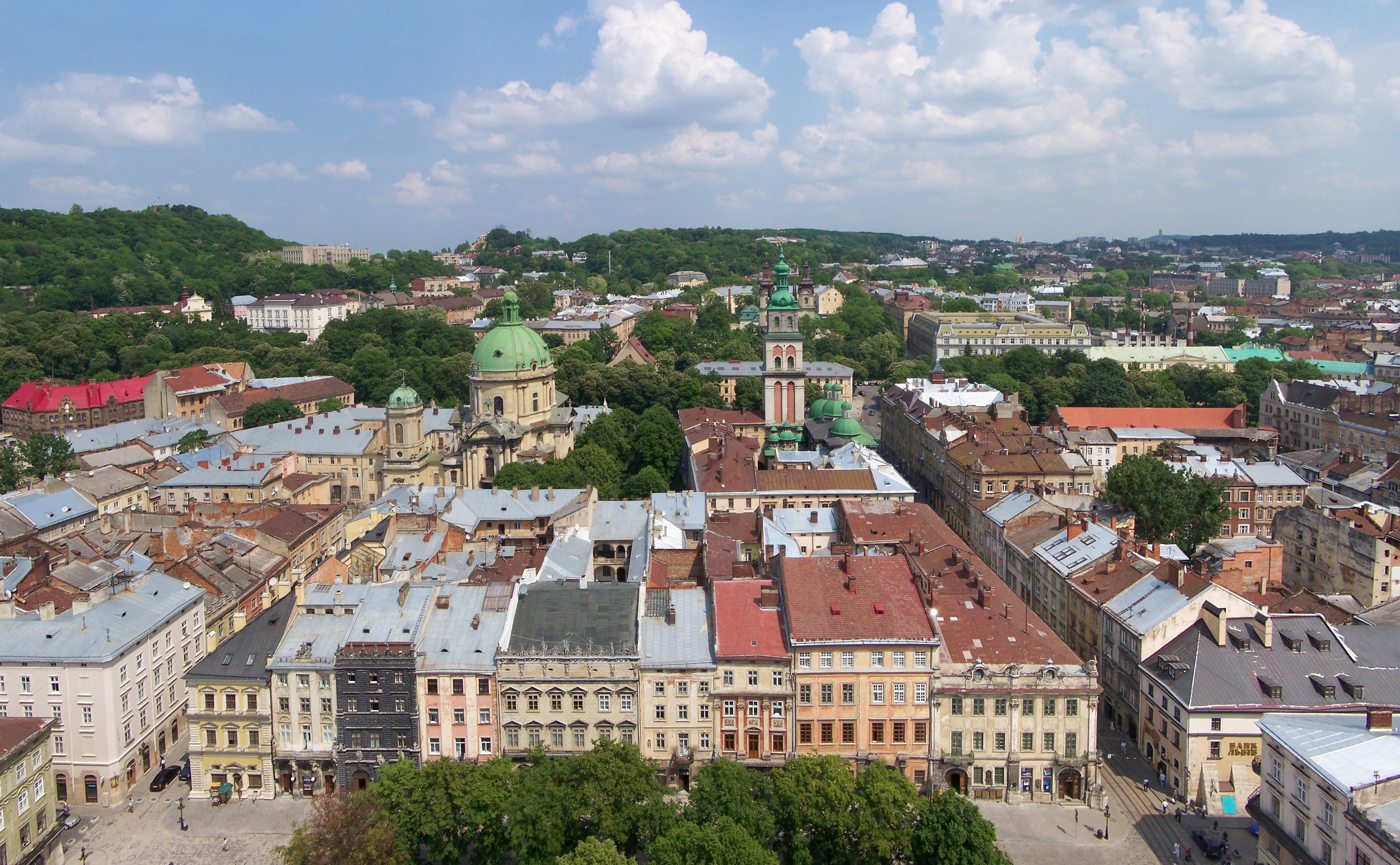
The old town of Lviv

Lviv (Ukrainian: Львів, L’viv; Polish: Lwów; German: Lemberg (archaic); Yiddish: לעמבערג; Russian: Львов, romanized: Lvov, see also other names) is an administrative center in western Ukraine with more than a millennium of history as a settlement, and over seven centuries as a city. Prior to the creation of the modern state of Ukraine, Lviv had been part of numerous states and empires, including, under the name Lwów, Poland and later the Polish–Lithuanian Commonwealth; under the name Lemberg, the Austrian and later Austro-Hungarian Empires; the short-lived West Ukrainian People's Republic after World War I; Poland again; and the Soviet Union. In addition, both the Swedes and the Ottoman Turks made unsuccessful attempts to conquer the city.

== Early history ==
=== Prehistory ===
Traces of settlement in the area of Lviv date back to the Mesolithic period (the region of the Devil's Rock). The continuity of settlement in the area of Lviv’s Old Town goes back to the 5th–6th century, while traces of settlement on Castle Hill date back to the 10th century, when a fortified settlement was established on the westernmost rise of Castle Hill, known as Bald Mountain, when the earliest stronghold was erected. The original name of the Bald Mountain settlement could probably be translated as "elevation"/"rise" from the Ruthenian language. The political affiliation of the area before the emergence of the medieval city of Lviv is less certain. The wider region changed hands between the Piast and Rus' rulers in the 10th and 11th centuries.

In 981, the Cherven Cities were conquered by Volodymyr the Great and came under the rule of Kyivan Rus, after the Kyiv expedition he again began in the early Piast monarchy of Bolesław the Brave and Mieszko II (1018–1031), and then occupied by the prince of Kyiv, Yaroslav the Wise in 1031.

=== The foundation of the princely town ===
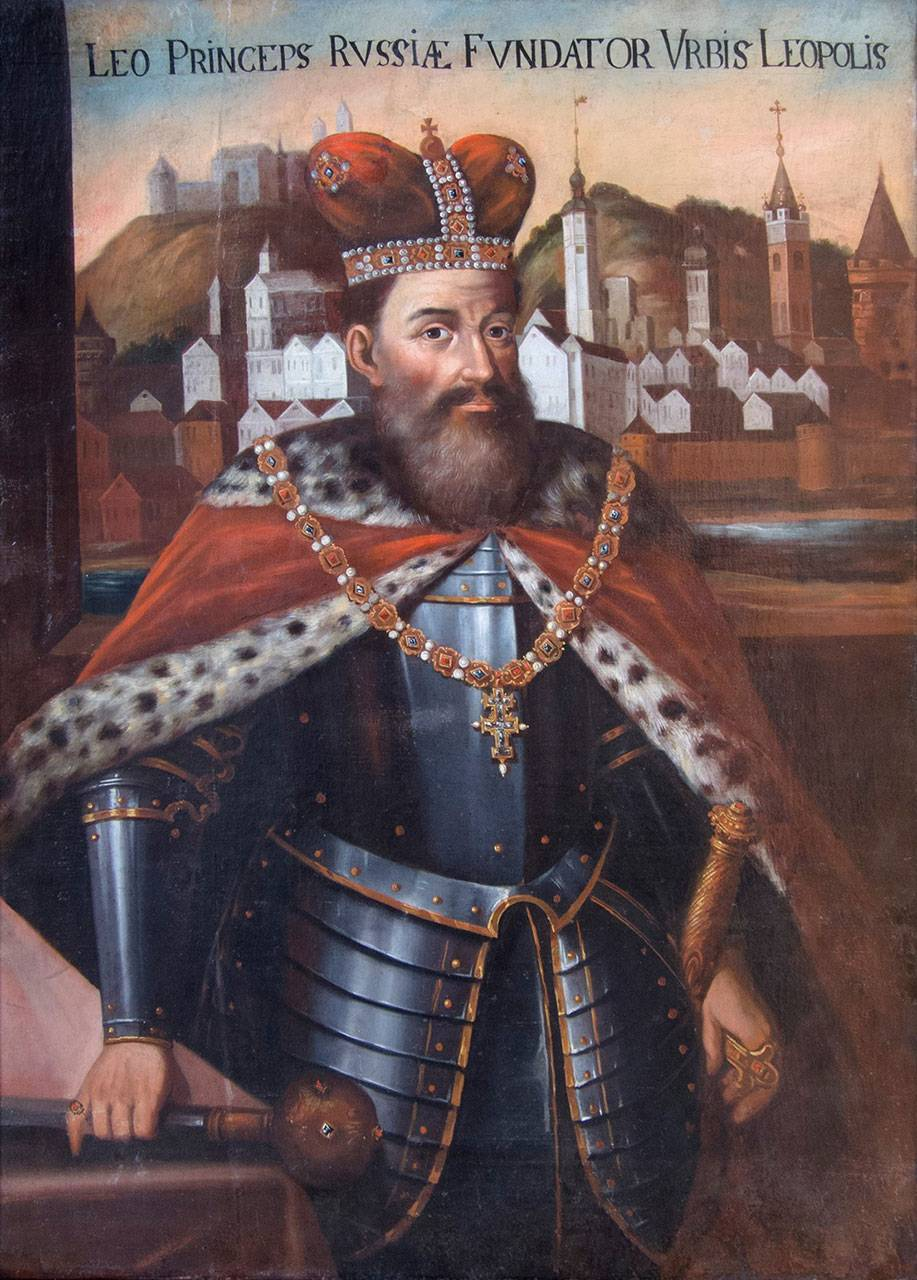
A fancy portrait of Leo I of Galicia, Lviv's namesake and reputed founder

Lviv is mentioned as a separate town only from the mid-13th century. The first mention of it appears in sources from 1259. Another source from 1261 states that the city’s fortifications were demolished at the Tatars’ demand, which indicates that it must already have been a fairly significant urban centre. Therefore, the origins of a town are usually dated to the first half of the 13th century. Most likely, after the Mongol invasion, it was rebuilt in 1241–1242 on the basis of an earlier settlement, with the layout reorganized and rights granted to settlers arriving from the West.

The rebuilding and new foundation of the town was most likely carried out by Daniel, Duke of Halych, subordinate to the Golden Horde and ruling the land from his capital in Chełm. He renamed the city in honour of his son Lev, who at that time was the duke of Belz. The toponym may best be translated into English as Leo's lands or Leo's City (hence the Latin name Leopolis). It is not clear how extensive the destruction caused by the Tatars in 1261 was; it is possible that Lviv had to be rebuilt almost from scratch.

Benefitting from its location on the intersection of trade routes between the Black Sea in the south, Baltic Sea in the north, Kyiv in the east and Kraków in the west, Lviv eventually eclipsed earlier urban centres in the region, such as Zvenyhorod, Halych and Kholm. The city also profitted from its more distant location from routes of Tatar raids in comparison to Kyiv.

The town was founded at the foot of the hill on which the ducal defensive stronghold was built. It had a quadrilateral layout, bounded on the west by the Poltva River and on the south by the Ortysha stream. Its centre was an irregular market square stretching southward from the Church of St Nicholas; its remnant is today’s Old Market Square. The church became the main Orthodox and princely church, and it was also one of the few masonry buildings in Lviv at that time. From the very beginning, the town had a multi-ethnic character; apart from Ruthenians, it was inhabited by Germans, Jews, Tatars and Karaites. The Germans played an important role, the German name of the town (Lamburga) appears in ducal documents. They also owned the Catholic Franciscan Church of Our Lady of the Snows. The second Catholic church was the Church of St John the Baptist, founded around 1270 at the request of Constance of Hungary, the wife of Lev of Halych. The Armenians also constituted a significant part of the population; around 1283 they built, outside the town walls, a church of their own rite dedicated to St Anne. The early town of Lviv was almost entirely built of wood, including its fortifications. Around the year 1300 it had twelve churches: eight Orthodox, two Catholic, and two Armenian.

After Daniel's death, Lev rebuilt Lviv around the year 1270. By choosing Lviv as his residence, Lev made Lviv the capital of Galicia-Volhynia.

In 1323 the Romanovich dynasty, a local branch of the Rurik Dynasty, died out. The city was inherited by Boleslaus of Masovia the heir to both the Piast dynasty on his father's side, and the Romanovich dynasty on his mother's side. He took the name of "Yuriy" and converted to Eastern Orthodoxy but failed to gain the support of the local nobles and was eventually poisoned by them in 1340.

=== Galicia–Volhynia wars ===
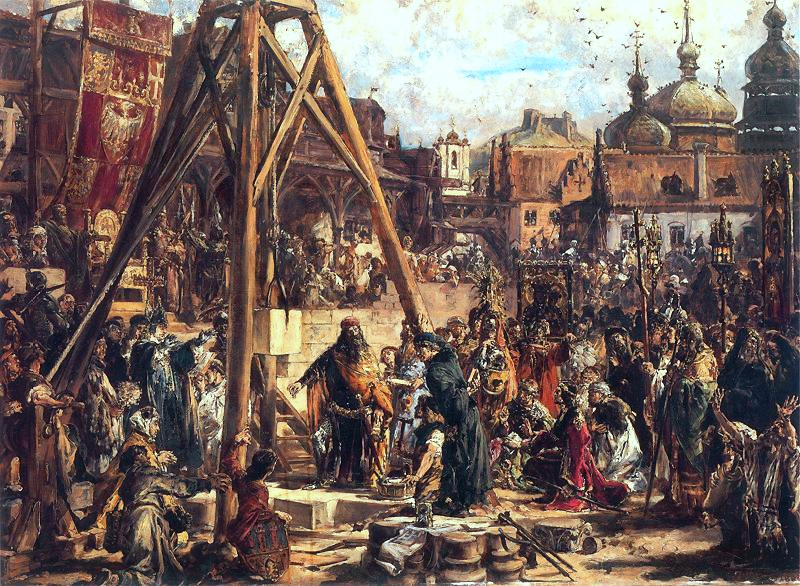
Casimir the Great establishing the first Roman Catholic church in Lviv in 1366, painting by Jan Matejko

King Casimir the Great of Poland asserted his succession rights, and as the closest relative of the deceased prince he launched two expeditions into Rus’ in 1340, supported by Hungary. During one of them, according to Polish annals, he captured and burned Lviv, carrying off the merchants and the ducal treasure. The reaction to Casimir’s raid was a retaliatory expedition by the Golden Horde, the overlord of the Galicia principality, into Poland in 1341, as well as a rebellion by the administrator of Przemyśl, Dmytro Dedko. Casimir repelled the Tatar incursion and came to an understanding with Dmytro, who thereafter governed Galicia in his name.

After Dedko's death King Casimir III entered Red Ruthenia and established direct rule there in 1349. In the course of his clashes with the Lithuanians, Casimir managed to consolidate his authority over the Lviv land, while Lithuanians controlled northern part of the principality. In 1350 he concluded an agreement with King Louis of Hungary that, should Casimir’s son inherit the Polish crown, Hungary would be allowed to buy back Rus’ from Poland for 100,000 florins. In 1353 the Lithuanians raided and destroyed Lviv.

Casimir’s retaliatory campaign of 1355 ended in success and in the imposition of his suzerainty over the Lithuanian princes in Volhynia. A sign of the consolidation of peace and of Casimir’s authority was the granting in 1356 of a location charter for Lviv under Magdeburg law.

== Kingdom of Poland ==
=== City of Casimir the Great ===
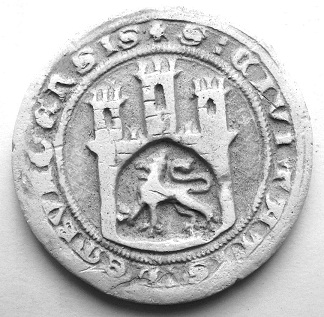
The greater armorial seal of the city council of Lviv, used since 1359. In the border (legend) the inscription: + S : CIVTATIS : LEMBVRGENSIS.

Lviv became the capital of the Ruthenian lands under Casimir’s rule, who appointed his own starosta there, Otton of Pilcza, no later than in 1352. Later, starostas appeared in other towns as well, but the one in Lviv had precedence over them, bearing the title capitaneus terrae Russiae. The king encouraged the influx of Polish nobles, to whom he granted estates in the region, as well as the arrival in the towns of Germans, Jews, and Armenians.

In 1356 Casimir III imparted upon the city with Magdeburg rights, which implied that all city issues were to be resolved by a city council elected by the wealthy citizens. The city council seal of the 14th century stated Civitatis Lembvrgensis. This started a period of accelerated development: among other facilities the Latin Cathedral was built, around the same time a church was built in the place of today's St. George's Cathedral. In 1356, the Armenian diocese was founded centred at the Armenian Cathedral. Lwów was one of two main cultural and religious centres of Armenians in Poland alongside Kamieniec Podolski. The Armenian Cathedral was built in 1363.

The presence of the Latin Church was also strengthening. Formally, the lands of the Halych principality were subject to the bishop of Lubusz, and there already existed a bishopric in Przemyśl, founded by Prince Yurii Boleslav. In 1358–59 the king brought about the creation of titular bishoprics in Chełm, Volodymyr, and Lviv. The last of these was entrusted to the Dominicans. In 1367 a Latin archdiocese was established in Halych, to which all the Ruthenian bishoprics were subordinated. It is very likely that from the beginning there were plans to move its seat to Lviv, since around 1360 Casimir III began the construction of a large cathedral church, near the new market square. However, this transfer did not actually take place until 1412.

During the second half of the 14th century, the urban centre of Lviv was moved towards Poltva River, whose flow was diverted to modern-day Shevchenko Avenue. A system of city walls and moats was constructed, along with two castles: Low Castle at the southwestern corner of urban fortifications, and High Castle, erected by Casimir III in 1360 on the hill previously housing the city watchtower. Two main city gates were located on the southern and northern sides of the city walls, leading towards Halych and Kraków respectively. Several suburbs, as well as manors of rich burghers (later known as jurydyka) emerged around the city. Among the most notable were Zamarstyniv, Klepariv, Holosko, Kulparkiv, Bilohorshcha and Briukhovychi.

After Casimir had died in 1370, he was succeeded by his nephew, King Louis I of Hungary, who in 1372 put Lviv together with the region of Galicia-Volhynia under the administration of his relative Władysław, Duke of Opole. When Władysław retreated from the post of its governor in 1387 Galicia-Volhynia became occupied by the Hungarians, but soon Jadwiga the ruler of Poland, and wife of Lithuanian Grand Duke Jogaila, incorporated it into the Polish Crown.

=== Under the Jagiellonian Dynasty ===
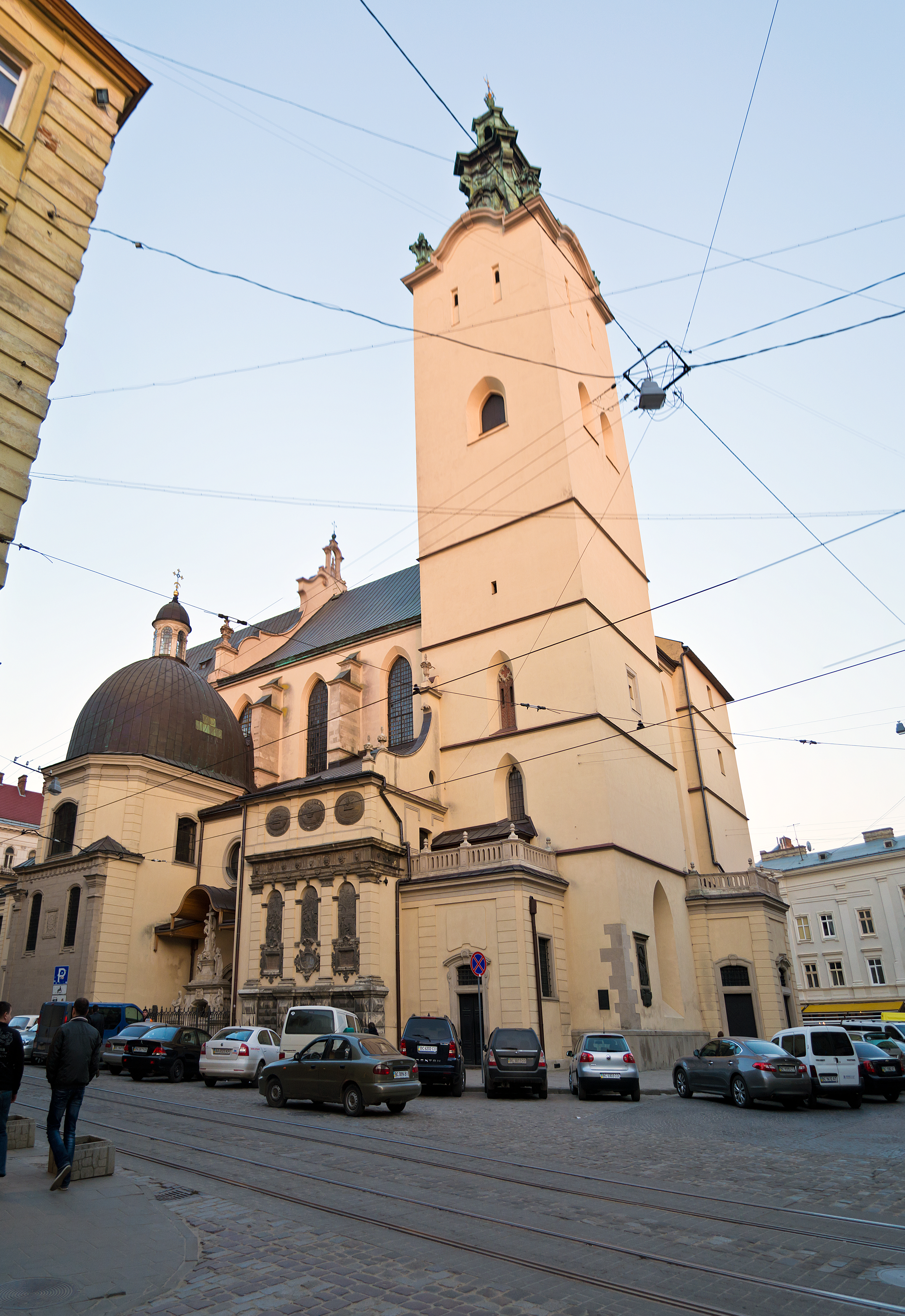
Latin Cathedral, seat of the Roman Catholic Archidiocese of Lviv

The city's prosperity during the following centuries is owed to the trade privileges granted to it by Casimir, Queen Jadwiga, and subsequent Polish monarchs. Lviv's character as a centre of trade and crafts was contributed to by the right of local authorities to organize trade fairs several times per year. Most of local credit during that time was held by Armenian and Jewish merchants. Germans formed the largest group of newcomers, followed by Poles and Czechs. In the 15th century, Germans eventually became the majority of the city's population. However, in the 1470s and 1480s, Ottoman expansion in the northern Black Sea region disrupted the trade networks in which the German merchants were active, resulting in a substantial decline in their economic influence. Most of the settlers were polonised by the end of the 15th century, and the city became a Polish island surrounded by the Ruthenian Orthodox population. In the early modern period, it also became one of the largest concentrations of Scots and Italians in Poland.

In 1412, the previously existing Roman Catholic diocese, founded in 1375 in Halych, was reformed into the Roman Catholic Metropolis of Lviv. The new metropolis included regional diocese in Lwów, Przemyśl, Chełm, Włodzimierz, Łuck, Kamieniec, as well as Siret and Kijów (see Old Cathedral of St. Sophia, Kyiv). The first Catholic Archbishop who resided in Lwów was Jan Rzeszowski.

In 1434, the Ruthenian domain of the Crown was transformed into the Ruthenian Voivodeship. In 1444, the city was granted the staple right, which resulted in its growing prosperity and wealth, as it became one of the major trading centres on the merchant routes between Central Europe and Black Sea region. It was also transformed into one of the main fortresses of the kingdom.

== Polish–Lithuanian Commonwealth ==
=== Period of flourishing ===
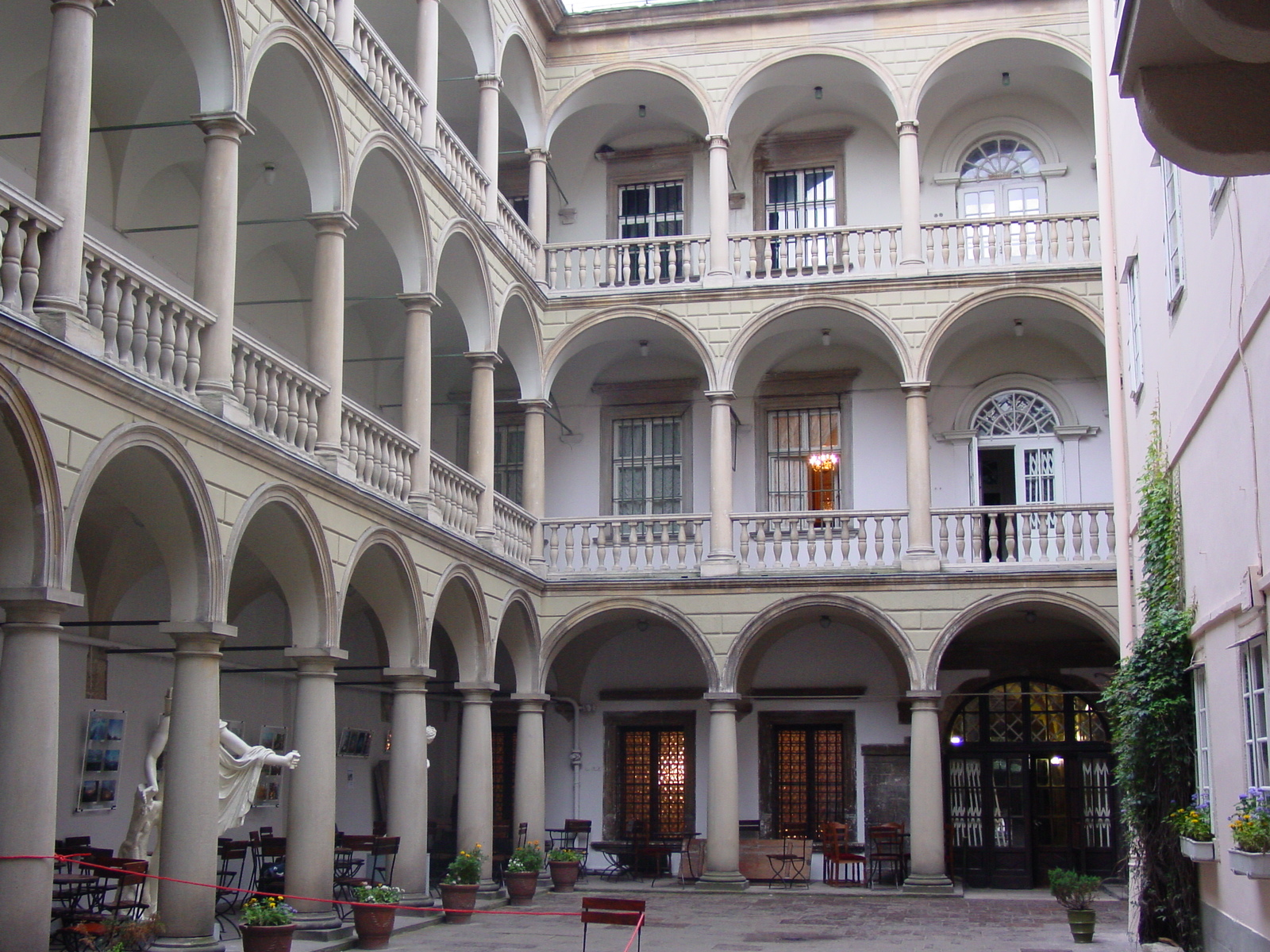
Renaissance yard of King Jan III Sobieski House

Following a century of decline resulting by disruption of trade routes, starting from the mid-16th century Lviv experienced another period of prosperity. The city's fortifications were strengthened, with Lviv becoming one of the most important fortresses guarding the Commonwealth from the south-east. Three archbishoprics were once located in the city: Roman Catholic (est. 1375), Greek Catholic and Armenian Catholic. The city was also home to numerous ethnic populations, including Germans, Jews, Italians, Englishmen, Scotsmen and many others. Since the 16th century, the religious mosaic of the city also included strong Protestant communities. By the first half of the 17th century, the city had approximately 25,000–30,000 inhabitants. About 30 craft organizations were active by that time, involving well over a hundred different specialities. Over 500 master craftsmen resided in the city, and locally produced cast products, gold and weapons were renowned for their high quality.

As a part of Poland the city was the capital of the Ruthenian Voivodeship, which included five regions: Lwów, Chełm, Sanok, Halych and Przemyśl. The city was granted the right of transit and started to gain significant profit from the goods transported between the Black Sea and the Baltic. Lviv became an important commercial centre, with a prosperous merchant class composed mainly of Armenians, Greeks, and Levantine Italians. Its trade connections were maintained primarily with the East, Hungary, from which wine was imported, and Gdańsk.

Starting from the early 16th century, ethnic Germans lost their predominant role in Lviv's society and politics. With time, the local German and Armenian communities were increasingly polonized. Additional migration took places, with the largest groups of newcomers being of Polish, Armenian and Jewish ethnicities. The city developed into a multiethnic community. Its inhabitants were divided into several nationes distinguished largely by religion: Polish (Roman Catholic), Ruthenian (Eastern Orthodoxy), Armenian (Armenian Apostolic), and Jewish. Protestant denominations were not tolerated in Lviv, and consequently their presence in the city remained negligible. In 1586, Pope Sixtus V rewarded the city for its loyalty to the Catholic faith by augmenting its coat of arms with three hills surmounted by a star, taken from his own arms. A Jesuit Collegium was founded in 1608, and on 20 January 1661 King John II Casimir of Poland issued a decree granting it "the honour of the academy and the title of the university".

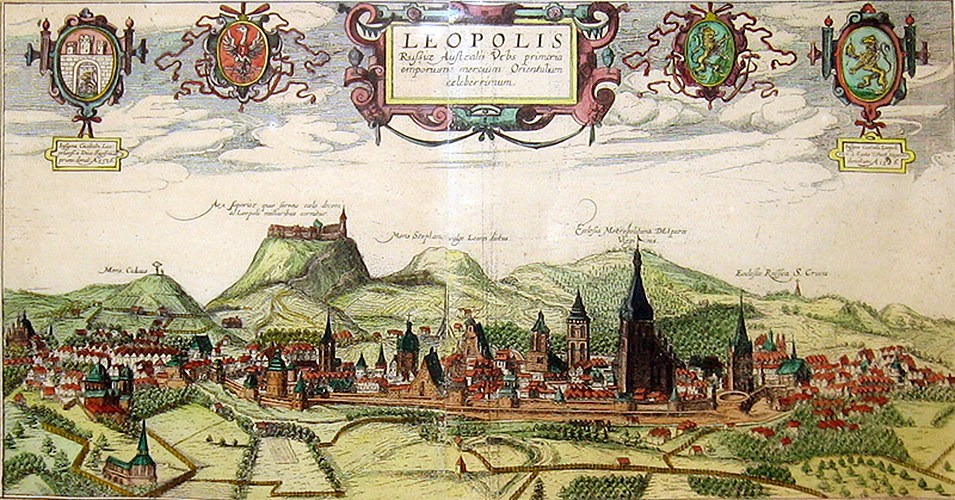
Lwów in a lithograph from 1618

As Magdeburg law was granted exclusively to Catholics, Orthodox Ruthenians (Ukrainians) were only allowed to live in suburbs and peripherial areas of the city. In order to fight against oppression from the Catholic elite, Orthodox brotherhoods were organized, with the most notable of them being the Dormition Brotherhood, originally established in 1439 and in 1586 awarded the rights of stauropegion by patriarch Joachim V of Antioch. The brotherhood's activities turned Lviv into a major cultural and religious centre of Ukrainian lands of the time. In 1572, one of the first publishers of books in what is now Ukraine, Ivan Fedorov, a graduate of the University of Kraków, settled in Lviv for a brief period. The city became a significant centre for Eastern Orthodoxy with the establishment of a Greek-Slavonic school, and a printer which published the first full versions of the Bible in Church Slavonic in 1580.

=== Decline of the Commonwealth ===
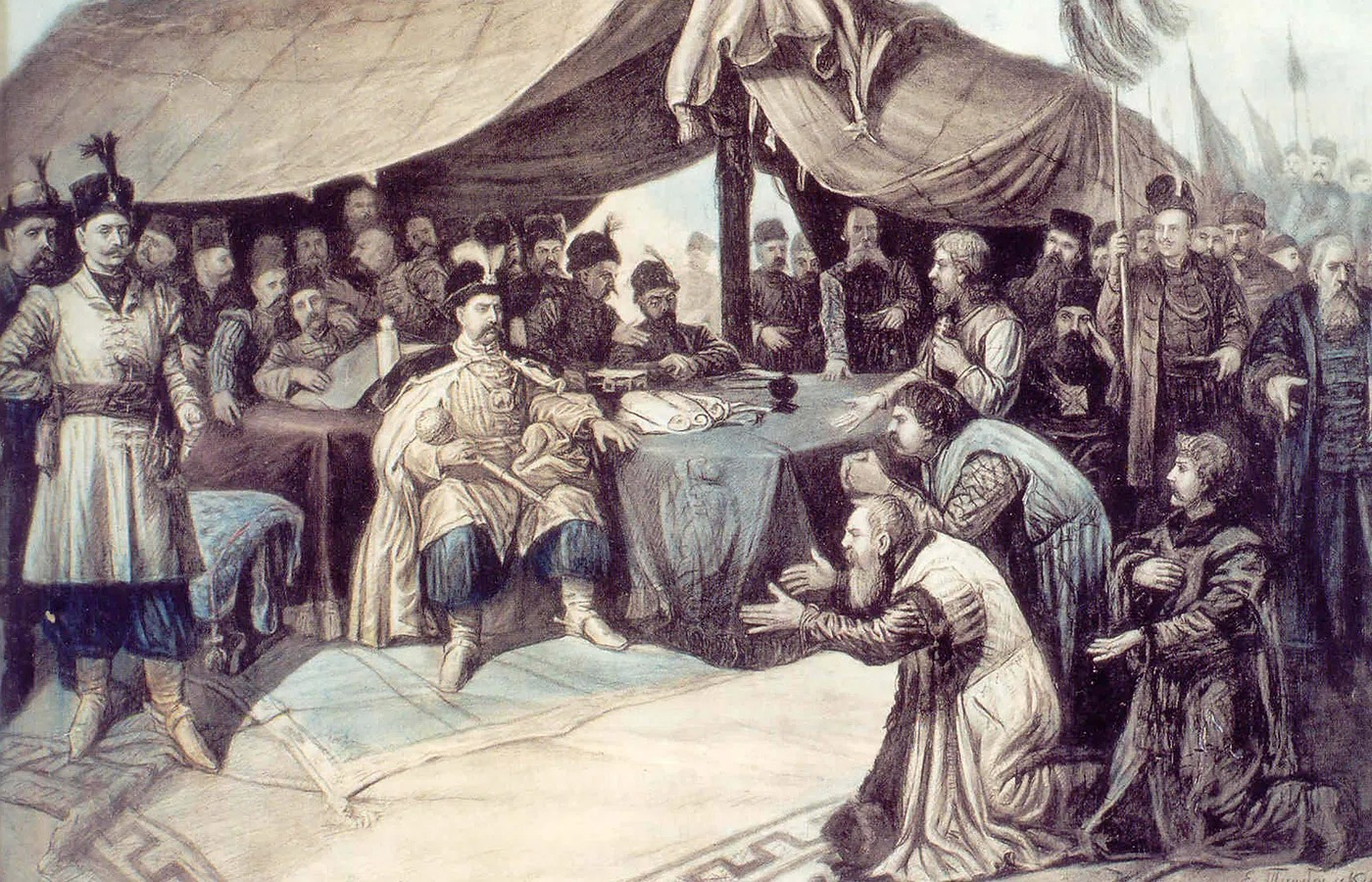
Ambassadors of the Lviv magistrate in the camp of Hetman Bohdan Khmelnytsky, 1655

The 17th century brought invading armies of Swedes, Hungarians, Turks, Russians and Cossacks to its gates. In 1648 an army of Cossacks and Crimean Tatars besieged the town. They captured the High Castle, murdering its defenders. The city itself was not sacked due to the fact that the leader of the revolution Bohdan Khmelnytsky accepted a ransom of 250,000 ducats, and the Cossacks marched north-west towards Zamość.

Khmelnytsky's forces returned to besiege the city once again in 1655. At that time, Lwów witnessed a historic scene, as here King John II Casimir made his famous Lwów Oath. On 1 April 1656, during a holy mass in Lwów's Cathedral conducted by the papal legate Pietro Vidoni, John Casimir in a grandiose and elaborate ceremony entrusted the Commonwealth under the Blessed Virgin Mary's protection, whom he announced as The Queen of the Polish Crown and other of his countries. The Swedes laid siege to Lviv, but were forced to retreat before capturing it. The following year saw Lviv invaded by the armies of the Transylvanian Duke George I Rákóczi, but the city was not captured. In 1672 Lviv was again besieged by the Ottoman army of Mehmed IV, supported by Crimean Tatars and hetman Petro Doroshenko; however the Treaty of Buczacz ended the war before the city could be taken. In 1675 the city was attacked by the Ottomans and the Tatars, but King John III Sobieski defeated them on 24 August in the Battle of Lwów. Another Tatar attack on the city took place in 1691.

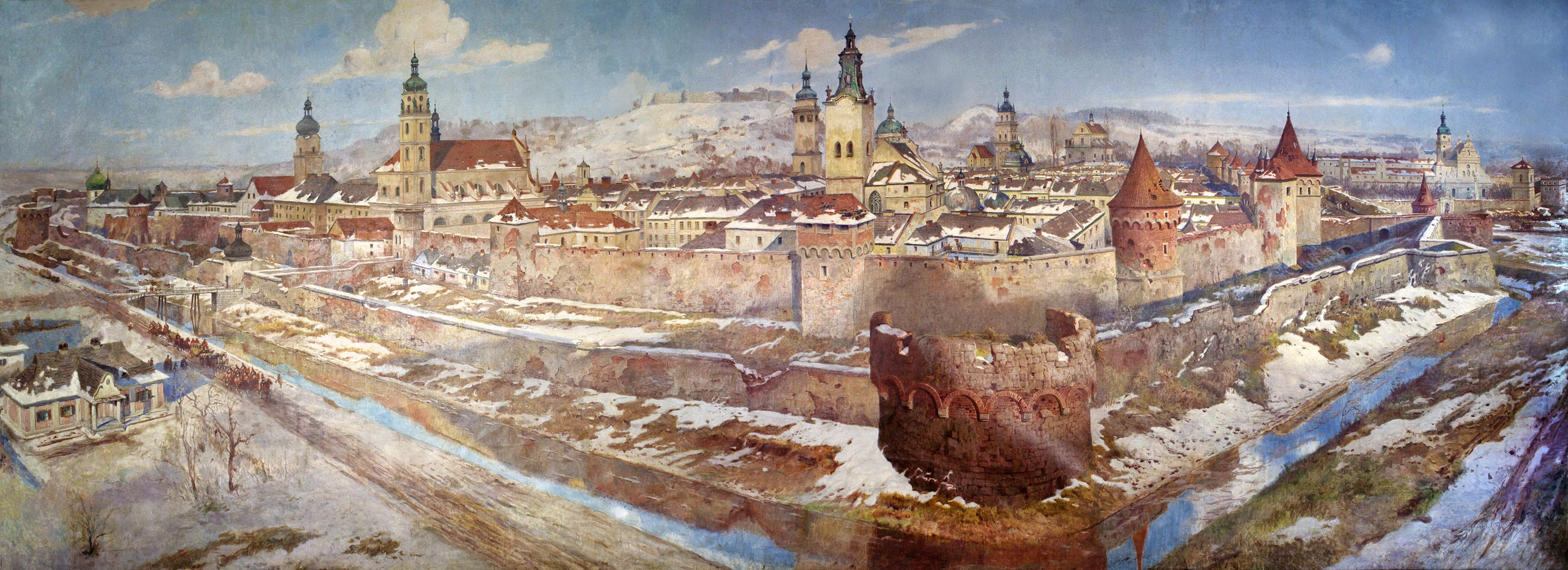
Panorama of the city of Lviv in the 18th century

In 1704, during the Great Northern War, the city was captured and pillaged for the first time in its history by the armies of Charles XII of Sweden. The Swedes imposed a significant contribution upon the locals. The plague of the early 18th century caused the death of about 10,000 inhabitants (40% of the city's population). Continious wars, disruption of trade routes and the political dominance of szlachta resulted in severe impoverishment of the urban classes and led to Lviv's general decline. By the second half of the 18th century, the city's guilds increasingly lost their importance in favour of independent craftsmen, provoking numerous social conflicts and decline of the urban infrastructure and fortifications. During that period, the majority of industrial and trade facilities in Lviv came into ownership of Jews.

== Habsburg Era ==
=== Late 18th century ===
In 1772, following the First Partition of Poland, the city was annexed by Austria and became the capital of the Austrian province called the Kingdom of Galicia and Lodomeria as Lemberg, its German name. Initially the Austrian rule was somewhat liberal. In 1773, the first newspaper in Lviv, Gazette de Leopol, began to be published. A new period of development started under Austrian rule, with a new wave of settlers, bureaucrats, soldiers and merchants settling in the city. Many Polish migrants also arrived during the period after the Partitions. Lviv housed the residence of the Austrian viceroy and continued to be the site of major trade fairs. In 1777, Austrian authorities ordered the dismantlement of old fortifications, with new boulevards being created on their site. Starting from 1841, Poltva River and its tributaries were gradually enclosed into underground canals. Major construction was initiated along the highway connecting Lviv to Vienna. According to an order of emperor Joseph II, 27 Catholic, 7 Orthodox and 3 Armenian churches and monasteries around the city were closed and transferred to state institutions.

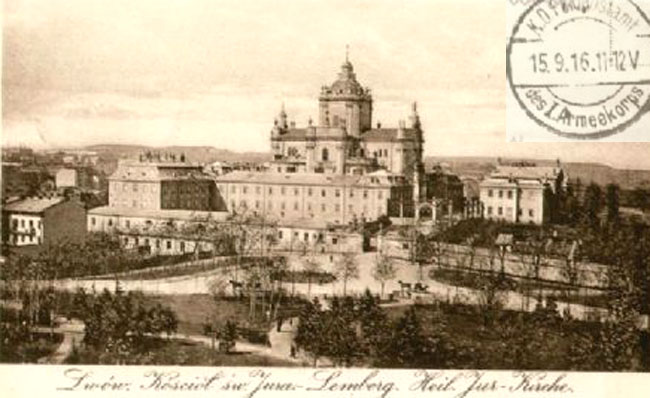
Greek-catholic Cathedral of St. George (in 1916)

In 1784, the Emperor Joseph II reopened the University of Lviv. Lectures were held almost exclusively in Latin, although some lectures, such as Pastoral Theology and Obstetrics, were conducted in Polish. German was used as a second language in some courses, primarily in Medicine. Eventually, the university established a Chair of German Language and German became the main language of instruction. In order to educate a new generation of Greek Catholic priests, the university established the Ruthenian Scientific Institute for non-Latin speaking students in 1787. These students were required to learn Philosophy for two years in their native language, Ruthenian and Polish, before studying Theology in Latin. The importance of the institute declined in 1795 after Austria annexed the Polish city of Kraków, which had an ancient and well-established university. Both schools were merged in 1805, and Lviv lost its status as a university city. However, this short period produced a great deal of intellectual activity such as the work of Johann Wenzel Hann, who from 1792 was a University Rector, eminent lecturer, poet and translator of Polish poetry into German after learning Polish himself. Physician Franz Masoch and his assistant Peter Krausnecker made significant contributions to the development of vaccination and the fight against Smallpox.

Wojciech Bogusławski opened the first public theatre in 1794. Józef Maksymilian Ossoliński founded in 1817 the Ossolineum, a scientific institute. Early in the 19th century the city became the new seat of the primate of the Ukrainian Greek Catholic Church, the Archbishop of Kyiv (Kiev), Halych and Rus, the Metropolitan of Lviv.

=== Early 19th century ===
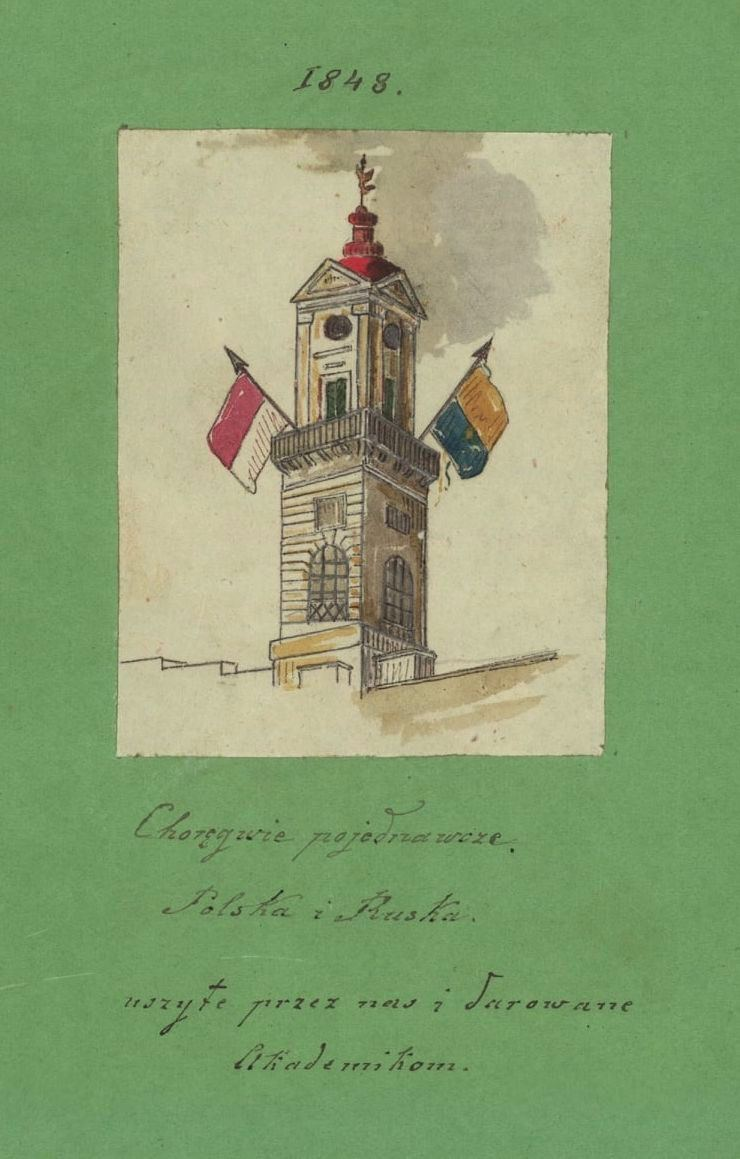
Flags of the Polish community and the Supreme Ruthenian Council hoisted on the building of Lviv Town Hall in 1848

The city grew throughout the 19th century, increasing in population from approximately 30,000 at the time of Austrian annexation in 1772 to 196,000 by 1910 and to 212,000 three years later; as a result of this rapid growth in population, poverty in Austrian Galicia became exponentially worse.

Blaming the Polish nobility for the backwardness of the region, the Austrian administration attempted to Germanise the city's educational and governmental functions. The university was closed in 1805 and re-opened in 1817 as a purely German academy, without much influence over the city's life. Most of other social and cultural organizations were banned as well. In the late 18th and early 19th centuries a large influx of Germans and German-speaking Czech bureaucrats gave the city a character that by the 1840s was quite German, in its orderliness and in the appearance and popularity of German coffeehouses. A rivalry developed between the new German elites and the older Polish elites. At the same time, the Ukrainian national revival started in Lviv with the foundation of the Ruthenian Triad in 1837.

=== The revolution of 1848 ===
The harsh laws imposed by the Habsburg Austrian Empire led to an outbreak of public dissent in 1848. In Lviv, the Supreme Ruthenian Council was formed and proclaimed the national unity between Galician Ruthenians and the people of Dnieper Ukraine. A petition was sent to Emperor Ferdinand I of Austria asking him to re-introduce local self-government, education in Polish and Ukrainian, and granting Polish with a status of official language. Six regiments of National Guards were formed after the fashion of the revolutionaries in Vienna, with one-half Polish and the other half Ukrainian. However, the Polish revolutionaries soon forced the Ukrainian regiments to disband and merge into the Polish ones, thus causing ethnic tensions between the groups.

After the uprising in Vienna was crushed on 2 November 1848, discontent spread among the revolutionaries. Arguments quickly broke out between the National Guard and regular Austrian troops garrisoned in the city. The commander of the garrison, General William Friedrich von Hammerstein, ordered the National Guards confined to their barracks. After repeated violations, Hammerstein ordered the arrest of the officers, and this caused the National Guards to seize the town center and throw up barricades.

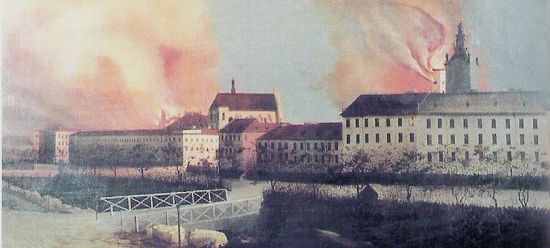
Fires in Lviv during the 1848 uprising

On 6 November 1848, the Imperial Austrian Army under the command of General Hammerstein commenced bombardment of the city center for three hours, setting fire to the town hall (Rathaus), as well as the academy building, library, museum, and many streets lined with houses. A committee of public safety composed of prominent residents surrendered to the General that day. A state of siege was put in force, martial law declared, and all houses were subject to search. The terms included the disarming of the Academical Legion, which was composed mostly of students, a reorganization of the National Guards and placed under the General's control, and the registration of all foreigners, as these persons were blamed in the city and many other places for spreading rebellion and discontent.

=== Developments in the mid-to-late-nineteenth century ===
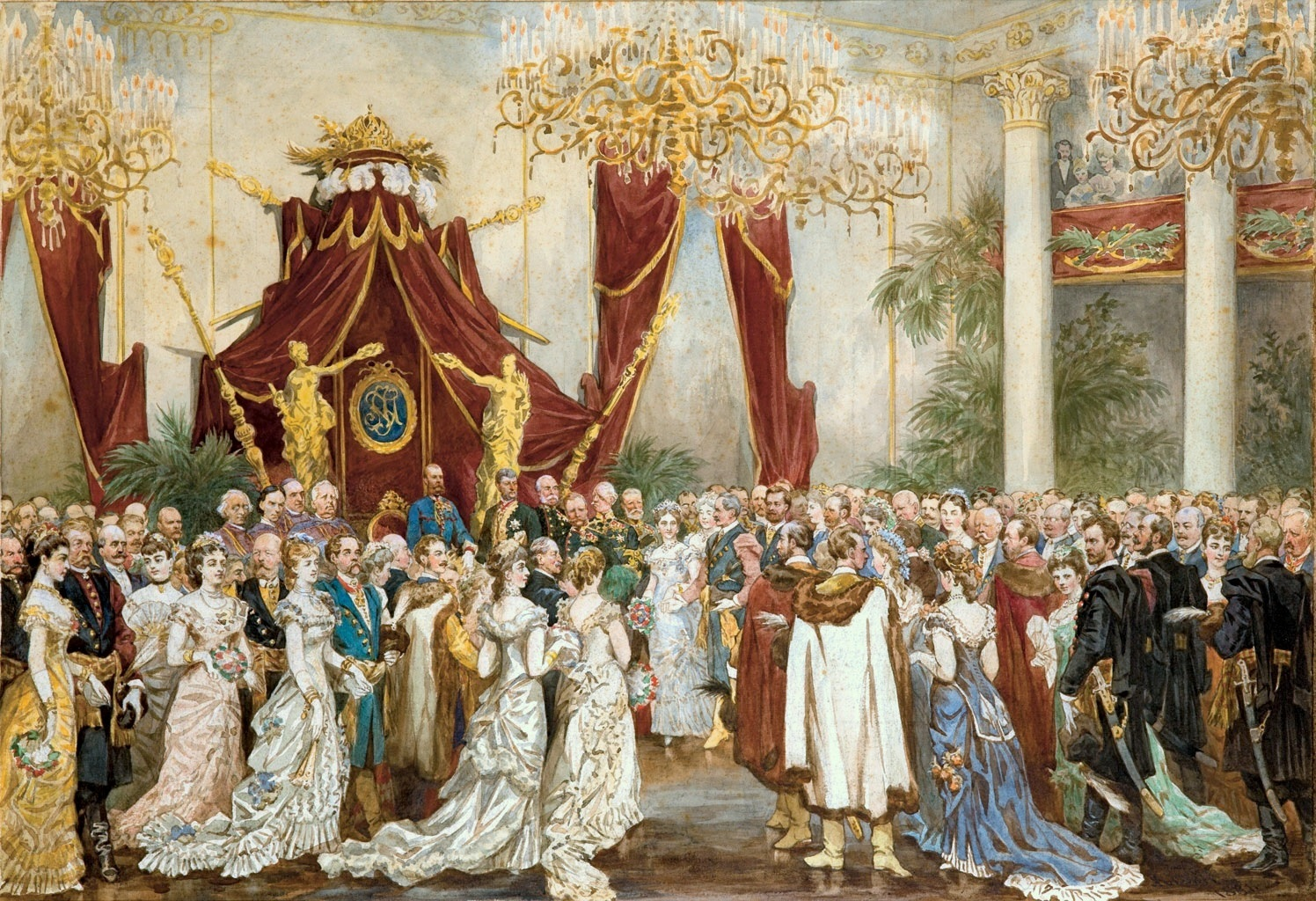
Emperor Franz Joseph I of Austria at a ball in the Lviv city hall

After the revolution of 1848 Ukrainian and Polish were re-introduced as languages of instruction at the university. Around that time a certain sociolect developed in the city known as the Lwów dialect. Considered to be a type of Polish dialect, it draws its roots from numerous other languages besides Polish. Most of the pleas were accepted twenty years later in 1861: a Galician parliament (Sejm Krajowy) was opened and in 1867 Galicia was granted vast autonomy, both cultural and economic. The university was also allowed to start lectures in Polish.

In 1853, it was the first European city to have street lights due to innovations discovered by Lviv inhabitants Ignacy Łukasiewicz and Jan Zeh. In that year kerosene lamps were introduced as street lights, which in 1858 were updated to gas and in 1900 to electricity. In 1861 a railway connection was established between Lviv, Przemyśl and Kraków. In 1866, the railway network was expanded to connect the city with Stanislaviv and Chernivtsi, in 1869 with Krasne and Brody and in 1873 with Stryi and Lavochne. As a result, Lviv became one of the largest railway junctions in Austria-Hungary and the whole Eastern Europe.

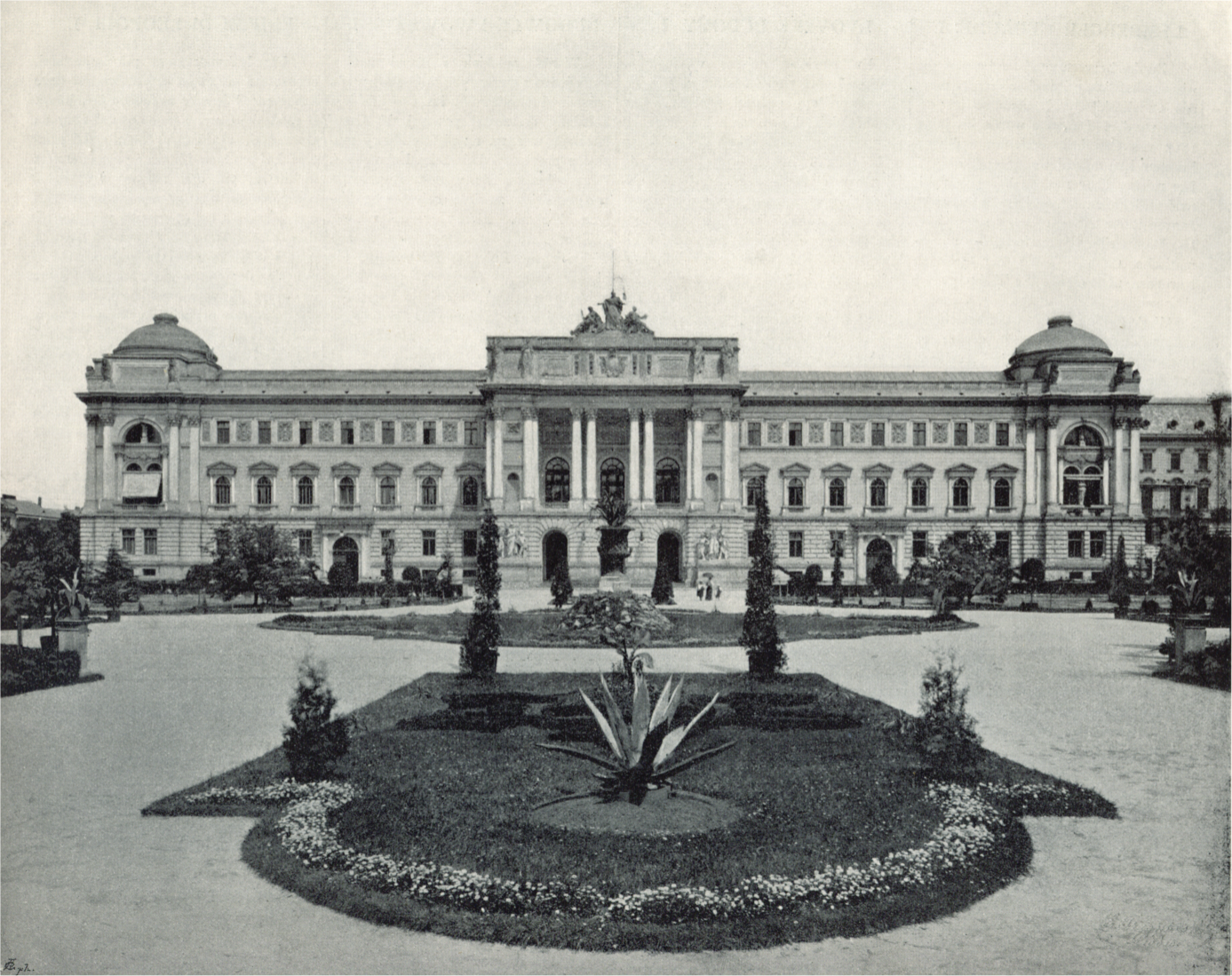
During Austrian rule, Lviv became the capital of the crown land Galicia and had its own regional assembly (pictured)

After the so-called Ausgleich of February 1867, the Austrian Empire was reformed into a dualist Austria-Hungary and a slow yet steady process of liberalisation of Austrian rule in Galicia started. From 1873, Galicia was de facto an autonomous province of Austria-Hungary with Polish and, to a much lesser degree, Ukrainian or Ruthenian, as official languages. The Germanisation had been halted and the censorship lifted as well. Galicia was subject to the Austrian part of the Dual Monarchy, but the Galician Sejm and provincial administration, both established in Lviv, had extensive privileges and prerogatives, especially in education, culture, and local affairs.

Following the construction of Main and Pidzamche railway stations, Lviv's territory expanded beyond the valley of Poltva. In 1871 the city was divided into 5 districts, with another one being added in 1890. In 1894, the city hosted the General National Exhibition. Economic growth led to major concentration of industry, and as of 1900 22 of Lviv's biggest enterprises employing over half of its workforce. Starting from the 1840s, numerous credit societies and banks emerged in the city.

Due to the persecution of Ukrainians in the Russian Empire, during the late 19th and early 20th century Lviv attained the status of leading Ukrianian cultural centre, benefitting from the liberal attitudes of Austrian authorities towards the Ukrainian national movement. Development of Ukrainian political life in the city and surrounding region led to the emergence of the Narodovtsi fraction, and resulted in the establishment of cultural and scientific organizations such as Prosvita, Besida Theatre, National museum, Lysenko Institute and the Shevchenko Scientific Society. Lviv also served as a major centre of Ukrainian printing, with the majority of all Ukrainian-language publications in the world being produced in the city by 1913.

=== The close of Habsburg rule ===
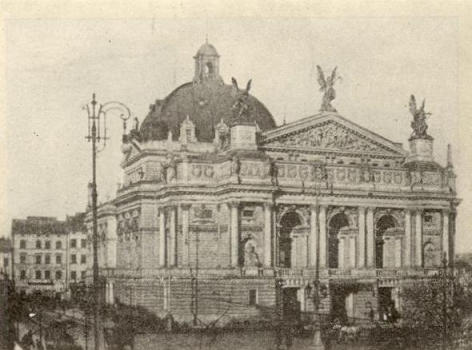
Lviv Opera house was constructed between 1897 and 1900

By 1900, Lviv had around 160,000 inhabitants, making it Austria-Hungary's fifth largest city. Lviv grew rapidly, becoming the 4th largest in Austria-Hungary, according to the census of 1910. Many Belle Époque public edifices and tenement houses were erected, and buildings from the Austrian period, such as the opera theater built in the Viennese neo-Renaissance style, still dominate and characterize much of the centre of the city. During Habsburg rule Lviv became one of the most important Polish, Ukrainian and Jewish cultural centers. The city, granted the right to send delegates to the imperial parliament in Vienna, drew in many prominent cultural and political leaders, and therefore served as a meeting place of Ukrainian, Polish, Jewish and German cultures. In Lviv, according to the Austrian census of 1910, which listed religion and language, 51% of the city's population were Roman Catholics, 28% Jews, and 19% belonged to the Ukrainian Greek Catholic Church. Linguistically, 86% of the city's population used the Polish language and 11% preferred the Ukrainian language.

The province of Galicia became the only part of the former Polish state with some cultural and political freedom, and the city then served as a major Polish political and cultural centre. Lviv was home to the Polish Ossolineum, with the second largest collection of Polish books in the world, the Polish Academy of Arts, the Polish Historical Society, the Polish Theater, and Polish Archdiocese. Similarly, the city also served as an important centre of the Ukrainian patriotic movement and culture, unlike other parts of Ukraine under Russian rule, where, prior to 1905, all publications in Ukrainian were prohibited as part of an intense Russification campaign. The city housed the largest and most influential Ukrainian institutions in the world, including the Prosvita society dedicated to spreading literacy in the Ukrainian language, the Shevchenko Scientific Society, the Dniester Insurance Company and base of the Ukrainian cooperative movement, and it served as the seat of the Ukrainian Catholic Church. Ideas of Ukrainian autonomy also resulted in the creation of paramilitary societies such as Sich and Sokil, which laid the base for the foundation of Ukrainian Sich Riflemen. Lviv was also a major center of Jewish culture, in particular as a center of the Yiddish language, and was the home of the world's first Yiddish-language daily newspaper, the Lemberger Togblat.

== 20th century ==
=== World War I ===
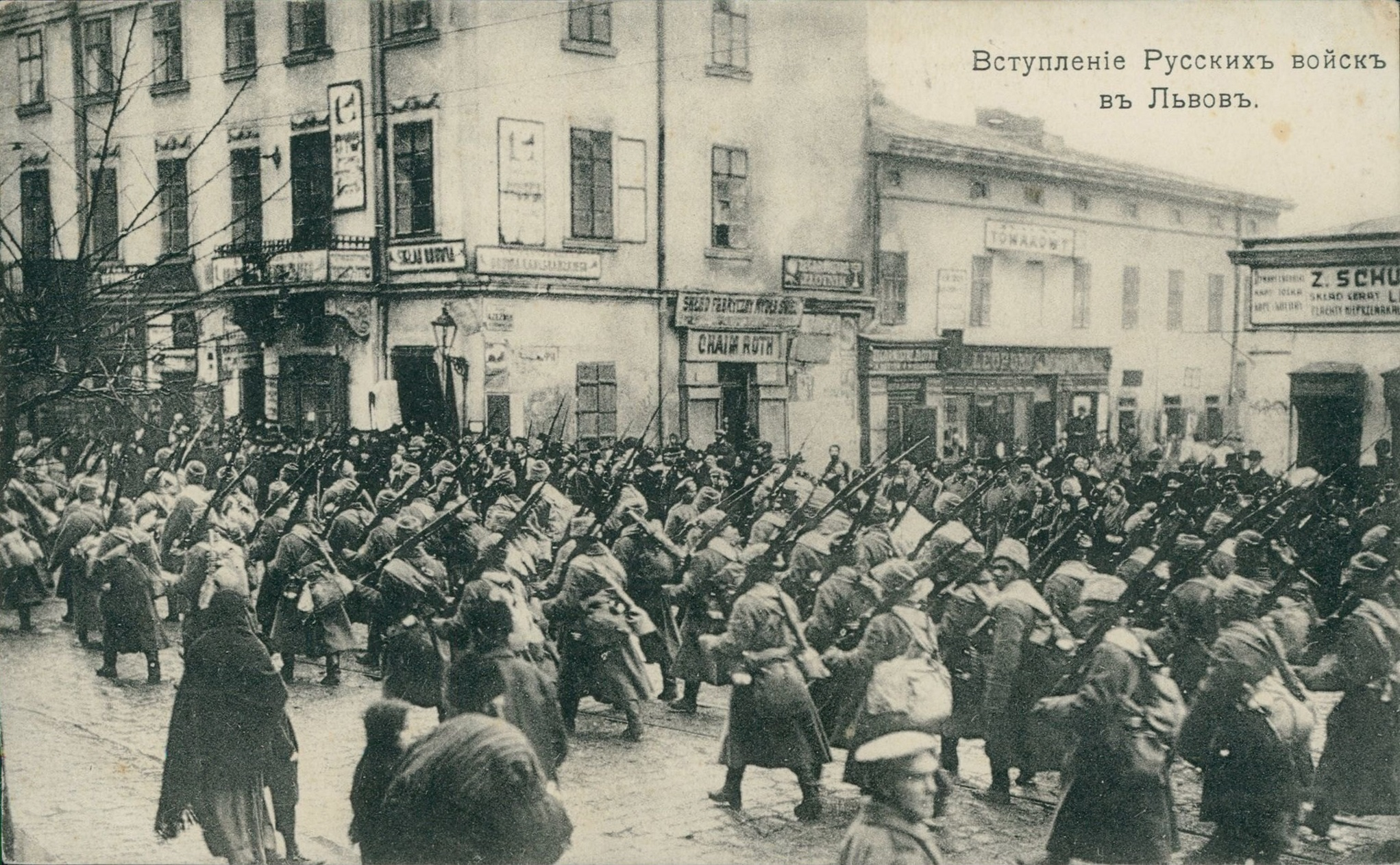
Russian army entering Lviv in 1914

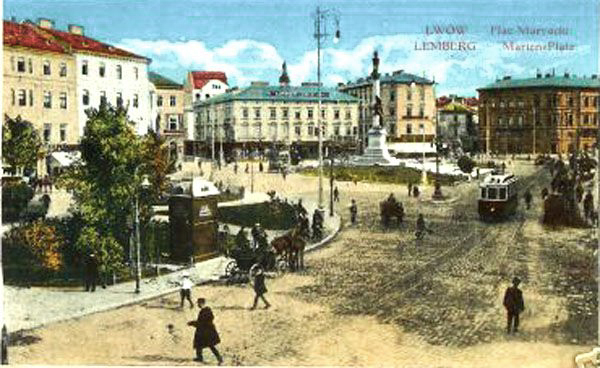
Lemberg (Lviv, Lwów) in 1915

In the Battle of Galicia at the early stages of the First World War, Lviv was captured by the Russian army in September 1914 following the Battle of Gnila Lipa. The Lemberg Fortress fell on 3 September. The historian Pál Kelemen provided a first-hand account of the chaotic evacuation of the city by the Austro-Hungarian Army and civilians alike.

The town was retaken by Austria-Hungary in June of the following year during the Gorlice–Tarnów offensive. Lviv and its population, therefore, suffered greatly during the First World War as many of the offensives were fought across its local geography causing significant collateral damage and disruption.

=== Polish–Ukrainian conflict ===
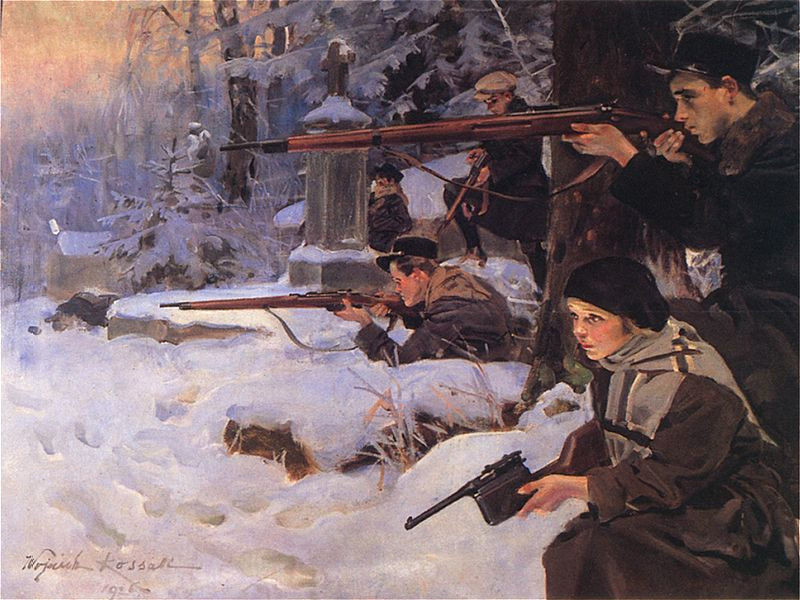
The Eaglets – The Defence of the Cemetery by Wojciech Kossak (1926). Oil on canvas, Polish Army Museum, Warsaw. A painting depicting Polish youths in the Lwów Uprising by Poles against the West Ukrainian People's Republic proclaimed in the city.

As the Austro-Hungarian government collapsed, on 18 October 1918, the Ukrainian National Council (Rada) was formed in the city, consisting of Ukrainian members of the Austrian parliament and regional Galician and Bucovinan diets as well as leaders of Ukrainian political parties. The council announced the intention to unite the West Ukrainian lands into a single state. As the Poles were making efforts to take over Lviv and Eastern Galicia, Captain Dmytro Vitovsky of the Sich Riflemen led the group of young Ukrainian officers in a decisive action and during the night of 31 October – 1 November, the Ukrainian military men took control over the city. The West Ukrainian People's Republic was proclaimed on 1 November 1918, with Lviv as its capital. The proclamation of the Republic—which claimed sovereignty over largely Ukrainian-populated territories— was a complete surprise for the Poles, who constituted a majority in the city. The Poles considered the territory claimed by the WUPR Polish. So, while the Ukrainian residents enthusiastically supported the proclamation and the city's significant Jewish minority accepted or remained neutral towards the Ukrainian proclamation, the Polish residents were shocked to find themselves in a proclaimed Ukrainian state. Ukrainian soldiers moved to detain the Austrian governor of Galicia, Count Karl von Huyn. The governor staunchly refused to formally hand over power to the Ukrainian National Council. On 2 November, Huyn announced that he is no longer able to perform his official duties and handed his authority over to his Ukrainian deputy, Volodymyr Detsykevych, who in turn relinquished his powers to Ukrainian leaders.

Immediately, the Polish majority of Lviv, a city of over 200,000, started an armed uprising that the 1,400 Ukrainian garrison consisting mostly of teenage peasants who were unfamiliar with the city were unable to quell. The Poles soon took control over most of the city centre. Unable to break into the central areas, Ukrainian forces besieged the city, defended by Polish irregular forces including the Lwów Eaglets. After the Inter-Allied Commission in Paris agreed to leave the city under Polish administration until its future was resolved by a post-war treaty or a referendum, the regular Polish forces reached the city on 19 November and by 22 November, the Ukrainian troops were forced out. When the Polish forces captured the city, elements of Polish soldiery begun to loot and burn much of the Jewish and Ukrainian quarters of the city, killing approximately 340 civilians (see: Lwów pogrom (1918)). After securing control of Lviv, Polish authorities shut down all Ukrainian institutions and societies, conducted mass arrests of Ukrainians, forced Ukrainians to work on Greek Catholic religious holidays, and dismissed most Ukrainian civil servants. Ukrainian members of the city council resigned in protest, and no Ukrainian would sit on the city council until 1927.

In the following months, other territories of Galicia controlled by the government of the West Ukrainian People's Republic were captured by the Polish forces, which effectively ended the power of the West Ukrainian government. The April 1920 agreement concluded by Poland with Symon Petliura, the exiled leader of the Ukrainian People's Republic, met with the fierce opposition of western Ukrainians. It recognized Poland's control of the city and the area in exchange for Polish military assistance to Petliura against the Bolsheviks.

=== Polish–Soviet War ===
During the Polish–Soviet War of 1920 the city was attacked by the Red Army forces of Alexander Yegorov. In mid-June 1920 the 1st Cavalry Army of Semyon Budyonny was trying to reach the city from the north and east. At the same time Lviv was preparing the defence. The inhabitants raised and fully equipped three regiments of infantry and two regiments of cavalry as well as constructed defensive lines. The city was defended by an equivalent of three Polish divisions aided by one Ukrainian infantry division. Finally after almost a month of heavy fighting on 16 August the Red Army crossed the Bug river and, reinforced by additional 8 divisions of the so-called Red Cossacks, started an assault on the city. The fighting occurred with heavy casualties on both sides, but after three days the assault was halted and the Red Army retreated. For the heroic defence the city was awarded with the Virtuti Militari medal.

=== Interbellum ===
Following the Peace of Riga the city remained in Poland as the capital of the Lwów Voivodeship. The city, which was the third biggest in Poland, became one of the most important centres of science, sports and culture of Poland. For example, the Lwów School of Mathematics embodied a rich mathematical tradition; the school gathered at the Scottish Café and maintained a notebook of problems and results.

Population of Lwów, 1931 (by religion)

Roman Catholic:	157,500	(50.4%)
Judaism:	99,600	(31.9%)
Greek Catholic:	49,800	(16.0%)
Protestant:	3,600	(1.2%)
Orthodox:	1,100	(0.4%)
Other denominations:	600	(0.2%)
Total:	312,200

Source: 1931 Polish census

Population of Lwów, 1931 (by first language)

Polish:	198,200	(63.5%)
Yiddish or Hebrew:	75,300	(24.1%)
Ukrainian or Ruthenian:	35,100	(11.2%)
German:	2,500	(0.8%)
Russian:	500	(0.2%)
Other denominations:	600	(0.2%)
Total:	312,200

Source: 1931 Polish census

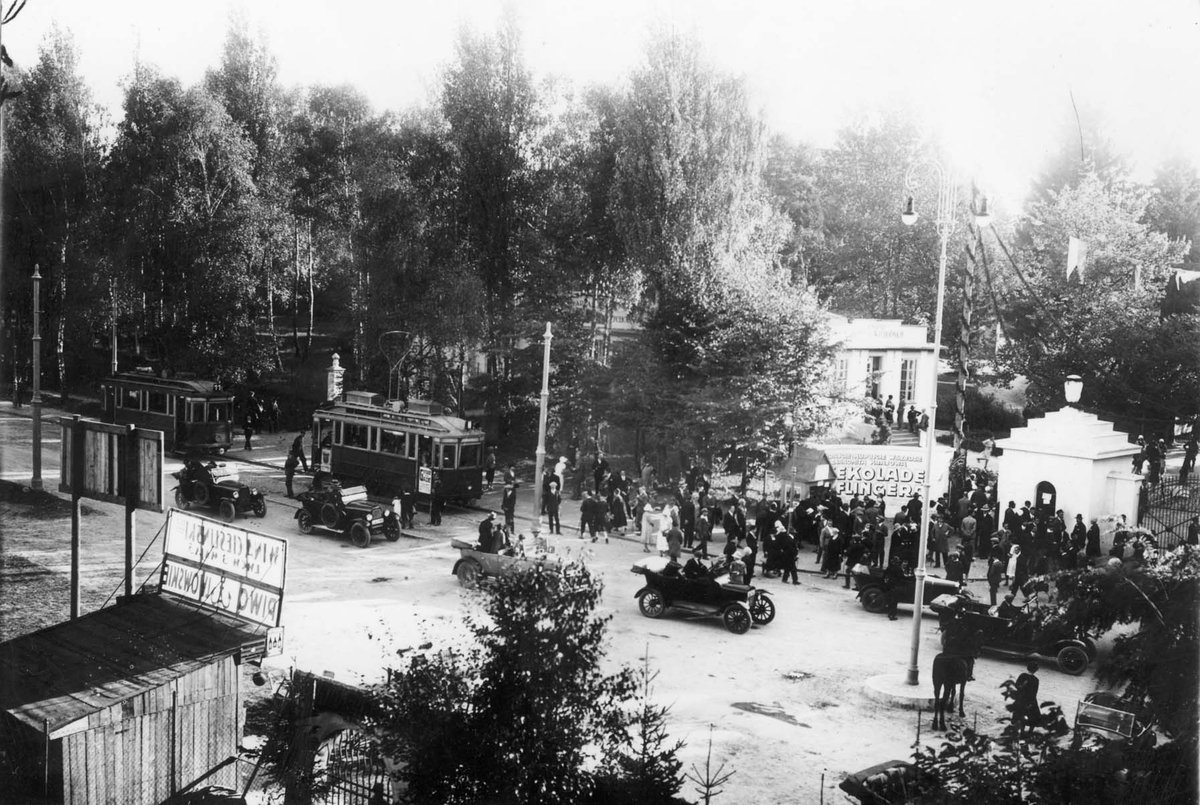
Eastern Trade Fair (Targi Wschodnie), main entrance.

During the interbellum period Lwów had grown significantly from 219,000 inhabitants in 1921, to 312,200 in 1931 (resulting from attachment of several suburban areas) and an estimated number of 318,000 residents in 1939. Although Poles constituted a majority, Jews formed more than a one-fourth of population. Ukrainian minority was also sizable one. There were also other minorities, including Germans, Armenians, Karaims, Georgians etc. Though their numbers may not have been numerically significant, their presence nonetheless enriched and enhanced Lwów's multicultural character and heritage. The city was, right after the capital of Warsaw, the second most important cultural and academic centre of Poland (in academical year 1937/38 there were 9,100 students, attending 5 higher education facilities including widely renowned university and institute of technology). Together with Poznań, Lwów was Poland's trade fairs centre, with the internationally renowned Targi Wschodnie (The Eastern Trade Fair) held annually since 1921, which had fostered the city's economic growth. Ukrainian cooperatives, such as Maslosoyuz, Tsentrosoyuz and Narodna Torhivlia, were also active in the city.

At the same time, the Polish government reduced the rights of the local Ukrainians, closing down many of the Ukrainian schools. Other schools were turned into bilingual ones by the Polish government that were, in effect, Polish. Increased Polish settlement reduced the relative percentage of the Ukrainian population in the city, from around 20% in 1910 to less than 12% by 1931. Ethnic Ukrainians owned only 6% of real estate in Lviv during that time. At the university, all Ukrainian departments that had opened during the period of Austrian rule were closed save for one, the 1848 Department of Ruthenian Language and Literature, whose chair position was allowed to remain vacant until 1927 before being filled by an ethnic Pole. Most Ukrainian professors were fired, and entrance of ethnic Ukrainians was restricted; in response an underground university in Lwów, and a Ukrainian Free University in Vienna (later moved to Prague) were established. In official documents, the Polish authorities also replaced all references to Ukrainians with the old word "Ruthenians", an action that caused many Ukrainians to view their original self-designation with distaste. In 1927, Polish authorities banned the usage of Ukrainian language during sessions of Lviv City Council.

The Polish government also sought to emphasize the city polskość or Polish character. Unlike in Austrian times, when the size and number of public parades or other cultural expressions such as parades or religious processions corresponded to each cultural group's relative population, during Polish rule limitations were placed on public displays of Jewish and Ukrainian culture. Obrona celebrations, dedicated to the Polish defence of Lviv, became a major Polish public celebration, and were integrated by the Roman Catholic Church into the traditional All Saints' Day celebrations in early November. Military parades and commemorations of battles at particular streets within the city, all celebrating the Polish forces who fought against the Ukrainians in 1918, became frequent, and in the 1930s a vast memorial monument and burial ground of Polish soldiers from that conflict was built in the city's Lychakiv Cemetery. The Polish government fostered the idea of Lviv as an eastern Polish outpost standing strong against the eastern "hordes."

== World War II ==
Red Army cavalry entering Lviv, 1939

Nazi Germany invaded Poland on 1 September 1939, and the German 1st Mountain Division reached the suburbs of Lviv on 12 September and began a siege. The city's garrison was ordered to hold out at all cost since the strategic position prevented the enemy from crossing into the Romanian Bridgehead. Also, a number of Polish troops from Central Poland were trying to reach the city and organise a defence there to buy time to regroup. Thus a 10-day-long defence of the city started and later became known as yet another Battle of Lwów. On 19 September an unsuccessful Polish diversionary attack under General Władysław Langner was launched. Soviet troops (part of the forces that had invaded on 17 September under the Molotov–Ribbentrop Pact) replaced the Germans around the city. On 21 September Langner formally surrendered to Soviet troops under Marshal Semyon Timoshenko.

The Soviet and Nazi forces divided Poland between themselves and a rigged plebiscite absorbed the Soviet-occupied eastern half of Poland, including Lviv, into the Ukrainian Soviet Socialist Republic. Initially, the Jewish and part of the Ukrainian population who lived in the interwar Poland cheered the Soviet takeover whose stated goal was to protect the Ukrainian population in the area. Depolonisation combined with large scale anti-Polish actions began immediately, with huge numbers of Poles and Jews from Lviv deported eastward into the Soviet Union. About 30 thousand were deported in the beginning of 1940 alone. A smaller percentage of the Ukrainian population was deported as well.

When the Nazis invaded the Soviet Union on 22 June 1941, the NKVD spent a week hastily executing prisoners held in the Brygidki and Zamarstynów prisons, where around 8,000 were murdered.

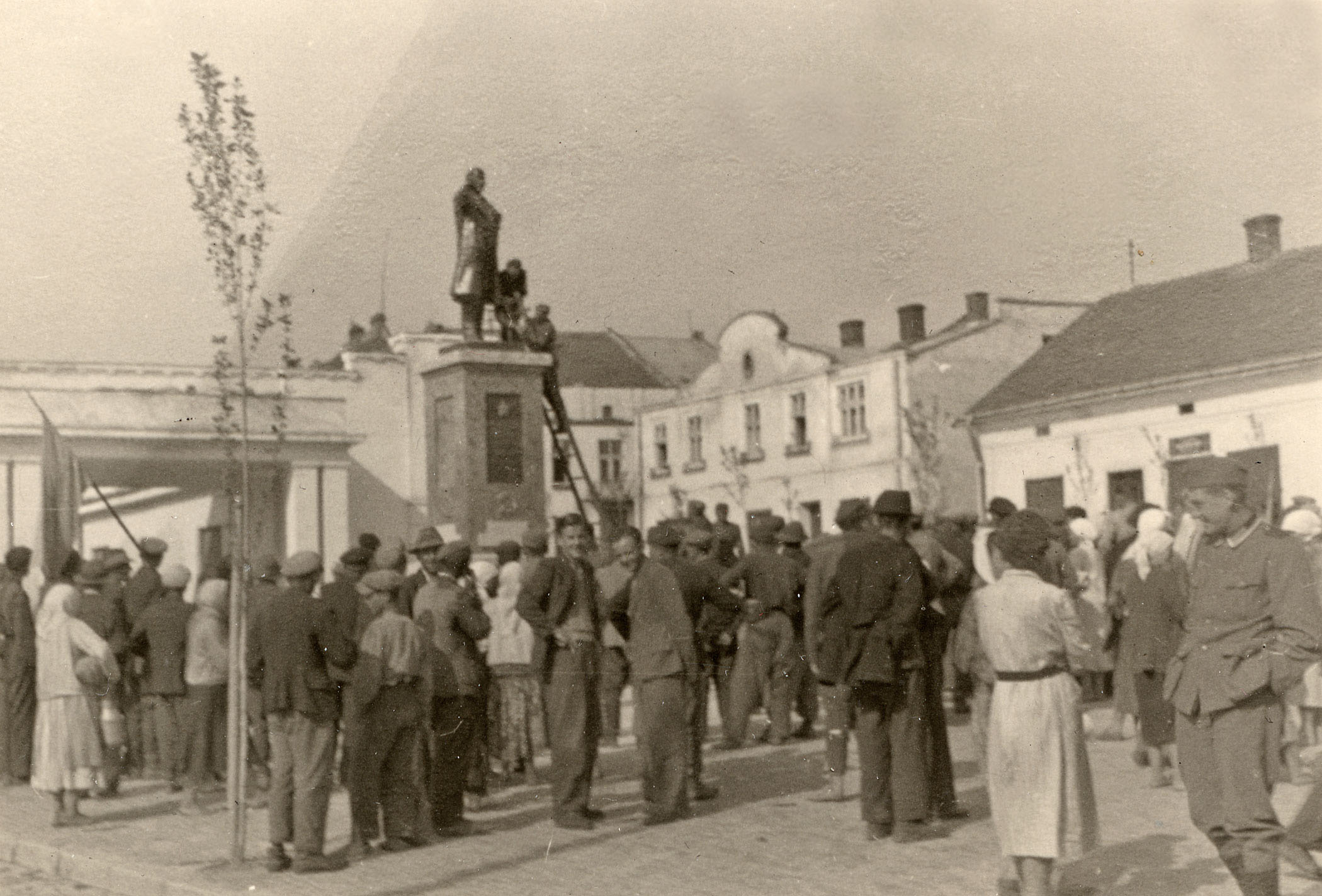
A Lenin statue in Lviv being removed after the arrival of German troops in the summer of 1941.

Initially, a great part of the Ukrainian population considered the German troops as liberators after the two years of genocidal Soviet regime, similarly to many Jewish and Ukrainian inhabitants who had earlier welcomed the Soviets as their liberators from the rule of "bourgeois" Poland. City's Ukrainian minority initially associated Germans with the previous Austrian times, happier for Ukrainians in comparison to the later Polish and especially Soviet periods. However, already since the beginning of the German occupation of the city, the situation of the city's Jewish inhabitants became tragic. After being subject to deadly pogroms, the Jewish inhabitants of the area were rushed into a newly created ghetto and then mostly sent to various German concentration camps. The Polish and smaller Ukrainian populations of the city were also subject to harsh policies, which resulted in a number of mass executions both in the city and in the Janowska camp. Among the first to be murdered were the professors of the city's universities and other members of Polish elite (intelligentsia). On 30 June 1941, the first day of the German occupation of the city, one of the wings of the Organization of Ukrainian Nationalists (OUN) declared restoration of the independent Ukrainian state. Yaroslav Stetsko proclaimed in Lviv the Government of an independent that "will work closely with the National-Socialist Greater Germany, under the leadership of its leader Adolf Hitler, which is forming a new order in Europe and the world" – as stated in the text of the "Act of Proclamation of Ukrainian Statehood". This was done without pre-approval from the Germans and after 15 September 1941, the organisers were arrested. Stepan Bandera, Yaroslav Stetsko and others, were arrested by Nazi Einsatzgruppe and sent to Nazi concentration camps, where both of Bandera's brothers were executed. The policy of the occupying power turned quickly harsh towards Ukrainians as well. Some of the Ukrainian nationalists were driven underground, and from that time forward, they fought against the Nazis, but continued also to fight against Poles and Soviet forces (see Ukrainian Insurgent Army).

As the Red Army was approaching the city in 1944, on 21 July the local leadership of the Polish Home Army ordered all Polish forces to rise in an armed uprising (see also Operation Tempest). After four days of the city fights and the advance of the Red Army in the final phase of the Lvov-Sandomierz Operation the city was handed over to the Soviet Union. As before, the Soviet authorities quickly turned hostile to the city's Poles, including the members of the Polish Home Army (whose leaders were subsequently executed by the Soviets), and the genocidal policies restarted.

Following the Soviet takeover the members of Polish resistance were either forcibly conscripted to the Soviet controlled Polish People's Army or imprisoned.

=== Lviv pogroms and the Holocaust ===
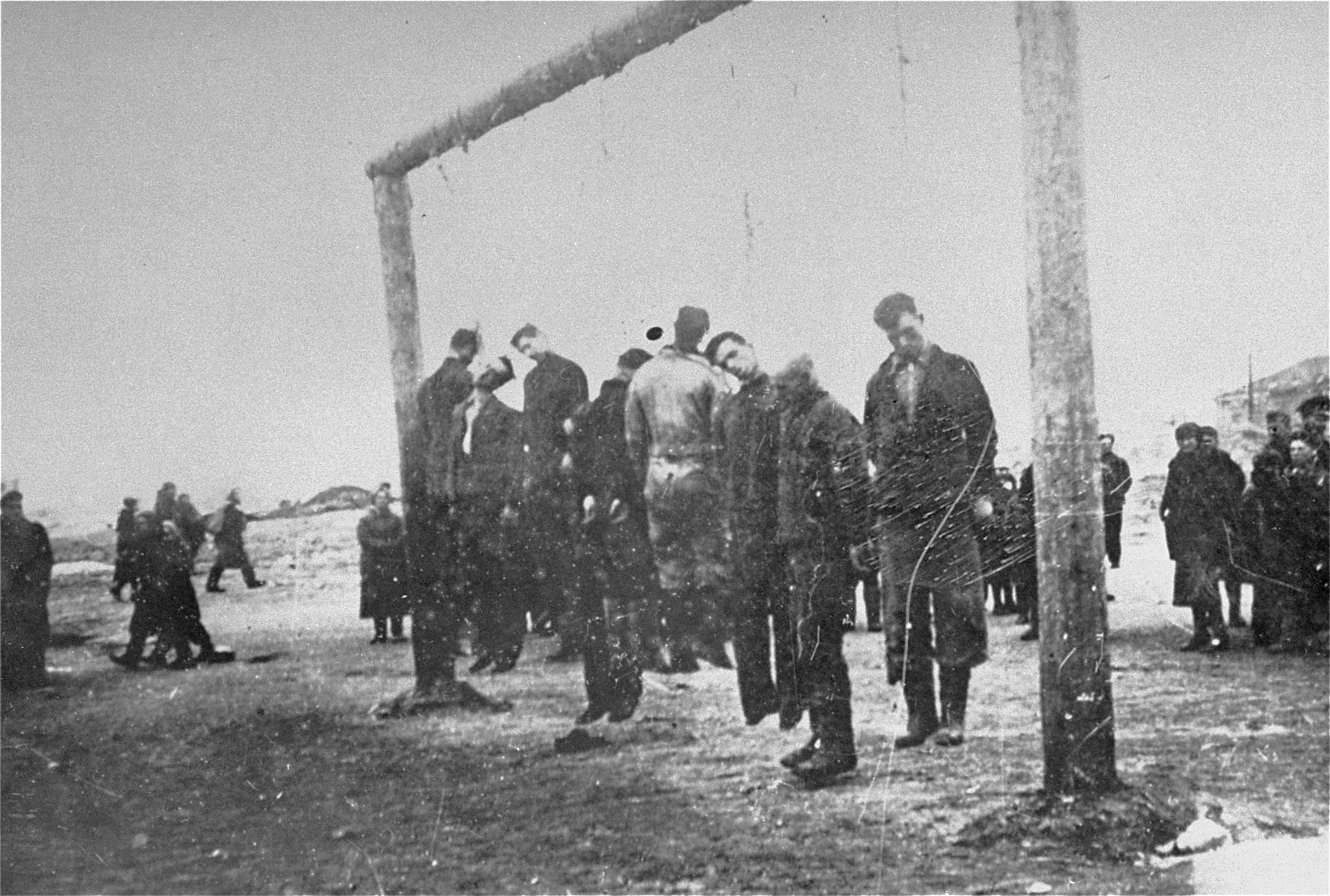
Hanging of the Lwów Ghetto Judenrat, 1942

Before the war Lviv had the third-largest Jewish population in Poland, which swelled further to over 200,000 Jews as war refugees entered the city. Immediately after the Germans entered the city, Einsatzgruppen and civil collaborators organized a massive pogrom, which they claimed was in retaliation for the NKVD's earlier killings (though Jews were also killed during the NKVD purge). Many Holocaust scholars attribute much of the killing to the Ukrainian nationalists. However the killers' actual political orientation and relation to the Organization of Ukrainian Nationalists is still subject to debate. During the four-week pogrom from the end of June to late July 1941, nearly 4,000 Jews were murdered. On 25 July 1941, a second pogrom, called "Petliura Days" after Symon Petliura, was organized; nearly 2,000 more Jews were killed in Lviv, mostly shot in groups by civilian collaborators after being marched to the Jewish cemetery or to Lunecki prison.

The Lwów Ghetto was established after the pogroms, holding around 120,000 Jews, most of whom were deported to the Belzec extermination camp or killed locally during the following two years. Following the pogroms, Einsatzgruppen killings, harsh conditions in the ghetto, and deportation to the death camps, including the Janowska concentration camp located on the outskirts of the city, resulted in the almost complete annihilation of the Jewish population. By the time that the Soviet forces reached the town in 1944, only 200–300 Jews remained.

Simon Wiesenthal (later known as a Nazi-hunter) was one of the most notable Jews of Lviv to survive the war, though he was transported to a concentration camp. Many city residents tried to assist and hide the Jews hunted by the Nazis (despite the death penalty imposed for such acts), like for example Leopold Socha, whose story was told in the 2011 film In Darkness, helped two Jewish families to survive in the sewers, where they were hiding after liquidation of the ghetto. Wiesenthal's memoir, The Murderers Amongst Us, describes how he was saved by a Ukrainian policeman named Bodnar. The Lvivans hid thousands of Jews, many of them were later recognized as Righteous Gentiles. A large effort in saving the members of the Jewish community was organized by the Ukrainian Greek Catholic Metropolitan Andrey Sheptytsky.

== Soviet period ==
=== Soviet re-occupation ===
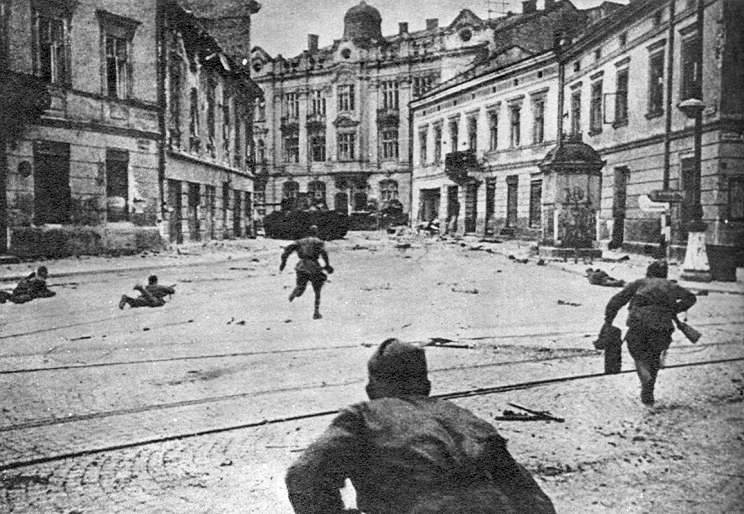
Soviet soldiers in Lviv, July 1944

After the successful Lvov–Sandomierz Offensive of July 1944, the Soviet 3rd Guards Tank Army captured Lwów on 27 July 1944, with significant cooperation from the local Polish resistance. Soon thereafter, the local commanders of Polish Armia Krajowa were invited to a meeting with the commanders of the Red Army. During the meeting, they were arrested, as it turned out to be a trap set by the Soviet NKVD. Later, in the winter and spring of 1945, the local NKVD continued to arrest and harass Poles in Lwów (which according to Soviet sources on 1 October 1944 still had a clear Polish majority of 66.7%) in an attempt to encourage their emigration from the city.

Those arrested were released only after they had signed papers in which they agreed to emigrate to Poland, which postwar borders were to be shifted westwards in accordance with the Yalta Conference settlements. In Yalta, despite Polish objections, the Allied leaders, Joseph Stalin, Franklin D. Roosevelt and Winston Churchill decided that Lwów should remain within the borders of the Soviet Union. Roosevelt wanted Poland to have Lwów and the surrounding oilfields, but Stalin refused to allow it.

On 16 August 1945, a border agreement was signed in Moscow between the government of the Soviet Union and the Provisional Government of National Unity installed by the Soviets in Poland. In the treaty, Polish authorities formally ceded the prewar eastern part of the country to the Soviet Union, agreeing to the Polish-Soviet border to be drawn according to the Curzon Line. Consequently, the agreement was ratified on 5 February 1946.

=== Postwar Soviet rule ===
In February 1946, Lviv became a part of the Soviet Union. It is estimated that from 100,000 to 140,000 Poles were resettled from the city into the so-called Recovered Territories as a part of postwar population transfers, many of them to the area of newly acquired Wrocław, formerly the German city of Breslau. Poles who stayed in Lviv later formed the Association of Polish Culture of the Lviv Land. In March 1946 Lviv became the site of a Church synod organized under the pressure of KGB, which formally dissolved the Ukrainian Greek Catholic Church by attaching its parishes to the Russian Orthodox Church.

According to various estimates, Lviv lost between 80% and 90% of its prewar population. Expulsion of the Polish population and the Holocaust together with migration from Ukrainian-speaking surrounding areas (including forcibly resettled from the territories which, after the war, became part of the Polish People's Republic), as well as from other parts of the Soviet Union, altered the ethnic composition of the city. Immigration from Russia and Russian-speaking regions of eastern Ukraine was encouraged, and during the 1950s ethnic Russians comprised almost a third of Lviv's population. During the same period, 28,000 Jews resided in the city, most of them being Russian-speaking immigrants from other parts of the Soviet Union. On 8 September 1956 the population of Lviv reached the number of 400,000 inhabitants.

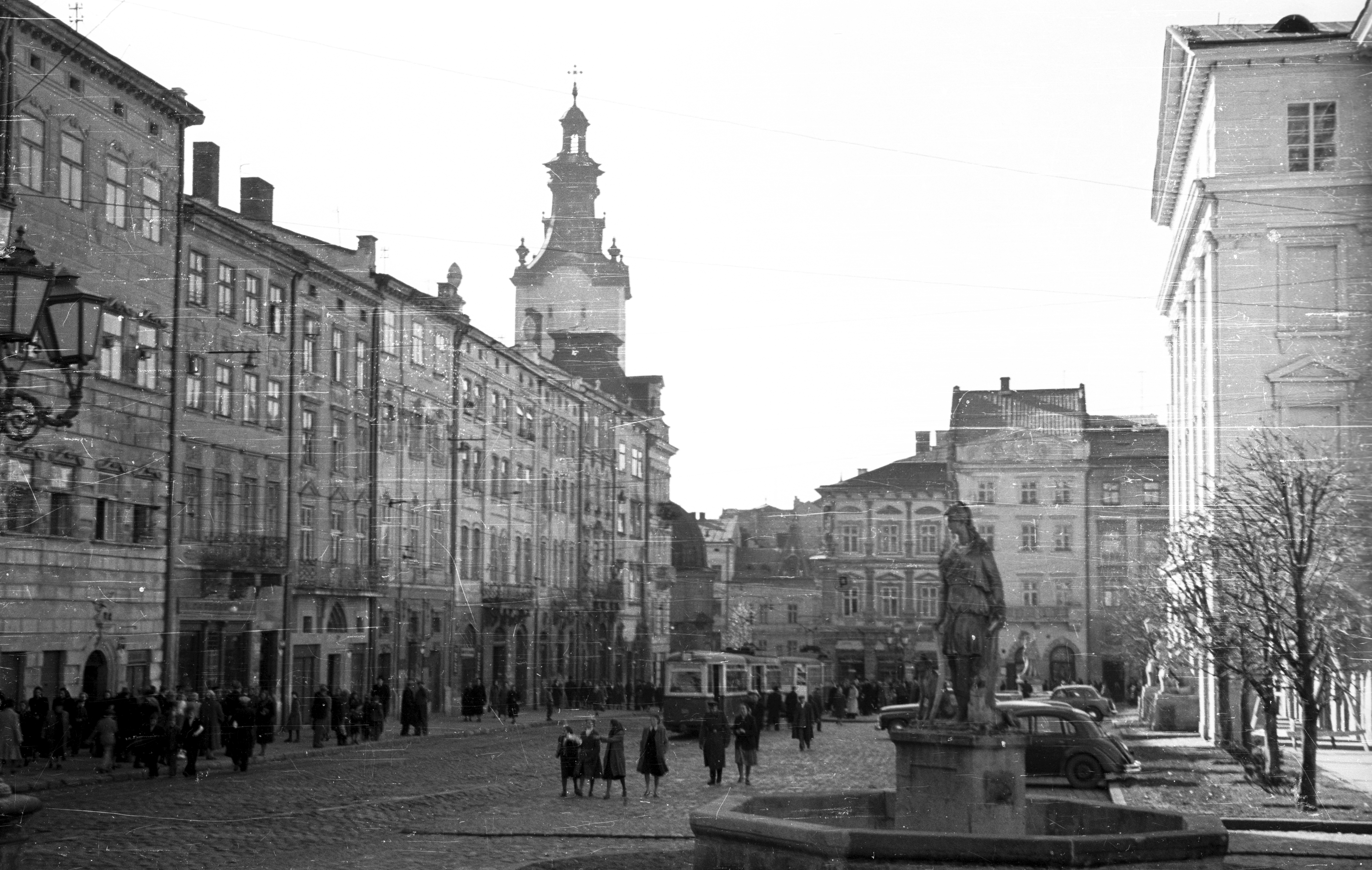
Market Square in 1957

In 1950 the first regional agricultural exhibition was opened in Stryi Park, and in 1951 a children's railway was launched. In 1952 the city's first trolleybus line was opened. By 1960, the city was served by 262 buses, 380 taxis and over 50 trolleybuses. In 1955 the new airport terminal started operations. By 1955 Lviv had by 415 restaurants, cafes and canteens, but it was still not enough to cover the needs of the growing population. Several public parks, including Shevchenkivskyi Hai, were established during the 1950s.

Due to the development of industrial enterprises in old city quarters, local authorities introduced measures against noise pollution. At the same time, until 1958 Lviv continued to serve as a transit point for heavy military equipment. In 1958 a house in one of the city's streets collapsed due to the movement of self-propelled artillery in a nearby street. As a result, the transport of military hardware through the old town quarters was outlawed, and the division stationed in Lviv was transferred to Yavoriv.

During the early 1950s the Soviet government adopted a resolution to turn Lviv into a major industrial centre. In 1954 the Soviet Union's first kinescope tube was produced on a local factory, and in 1958 serial production of TV sets started. In 1956 the Lviv Bus Factory launched its production. A tank repair plant was also established in the city. In order to accommodate the working population, authorities ordered the construction of cheap housing. At the same time, much more comfortable buildings in Stalinist style were erected for the Communist elite. Despite the new construction, many people continued to live in communal flats or even in cellars. Central heating, water supplies and sewers were absent in many districts. Throughout the 1950s, several nearby villages and towns were administratively incorporated into Lviv, including Briukhovychi and Vynnyky. In December 1957 the Lviv TV centre made its first broadcast from the city's Opera Theatre.

In the 1950s and 1960s, the city expanded both in population and size mostly due to its rapidly growing industrial base. Due to the fight of SMERSH with the Ukrainian Insurgent Army, Lviv obtained a nickname with a negative connotation: Banderstadt, meaning the city of Stepan Bandera. The German suffix for the city stadt was added instead of the Russian grad to imply alienation. Over the years the residents of the city found this so ridiculous that even people not familiar with Bandera accepted it as sarcasm in reference to the Soviet perception of western Ukraine. By the time of the fall of the Soviet Union the name became a proud mark for the Lviv natives culminating in the creation of a local rock band under the name Khloptsi z Bandershtadtu (Boys from Banderstadt).

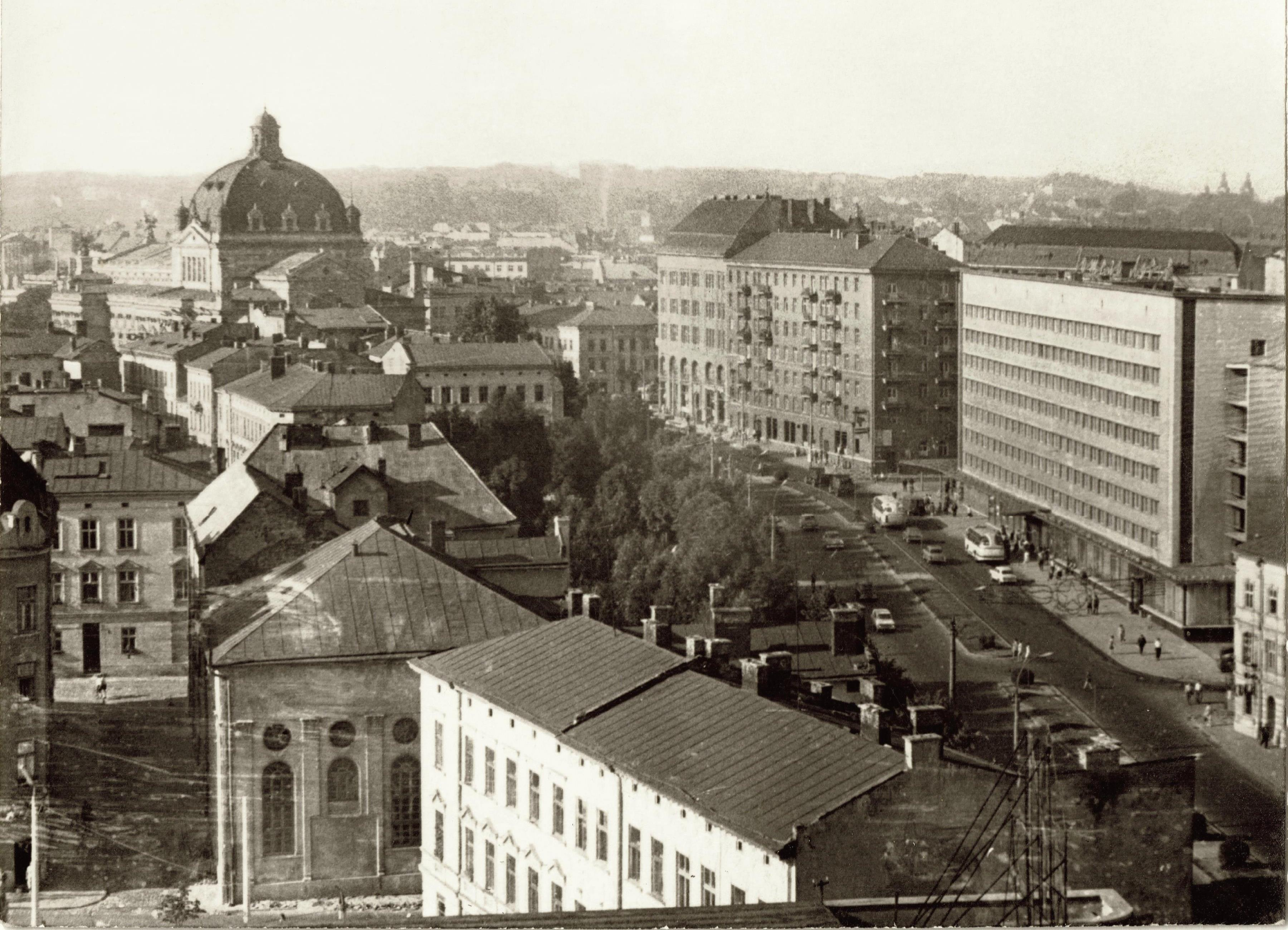
View on the Opera Theatre and Hotel Lviv in the late 1960s

During the 1960s, inhabitants of Lviv and the surrounding region benefitted from their access to Polish television and radio, as well as press publications from fellow Warsaw Pact countries. Many migrants from Ukrainian villages, who settled in the city during that time, had relatives abroad and could engage in correspondence across the Iron Curtain. In order to combat "bourgeois nationalism", Soviet authorities outlawed the combination of blue and yellow in printed production and media. In order to combat religion, the regime closed down Lviv's Dominican Cathedral and organized a museum of atheism in its building. Despite government pressure, Lviv's inhabitants continued to follow religious traditions, with many districts organizing vertep performances. During the 1960s Lviv also developed its own youth subcultures, which formed under the influence of Western music.

During the 1970s the policies of Ukrainian Soviet leadership under Volodymyr Shcherbytsky resulted in a new wave of Russification. Many inscriptions and advertisements in Lviv's streets and in public transport were now written in Russian language. Meanwhile the economic situation worsened, with numerous goods disappearing form shops by the middle part of the decade. By the end of 1970s inflation became a major concern. At the same time, the city's trade network continued to expand, with more than 200 shops being built. New cultural trends continued to influence Lviv's population, and in 1979 two cult locations appeared in the city: youth palace "Romantyk", which became popular due to its disco, and the "Virmenka" coffee house, which became a gathering place for local bohéme. The 1970s saw the rise of the hippie movement in Lviv. In 1975-1977 the garden of the local Carmelite Monastery became a centre of gatherings for nonconformist youth from various parts of the Soviet Union. Despite the conditions of Soviet Russification, Lviv became a major centre of the dissident movement. Starting from 1972, many of Lviv's dissident activists were arrested and held in the infamous Prison on Łącki Street.

In the period of Soviet liberalization of the mid-to-end 1980s until the early 1990s (see Glasnost and Perestroika) the city became the centre of Rukh (People's Movement of Ukraine), a political movement advocating Ukrainian independence from the USSR. On 17 September 1989 Lviv saw the largest rally in support of Ukraine's independence from the Soviet Union, gathering some 100,000 participants.

== Independent Ukraine ==
With the dissolution of the Soviet Union in 1991, Lviv became part of the newly independent Ukraine, serving as the capital of the Lviv Oblast. Today the city remains one of the most important centers of Ukrainian cultural, economic and political life and is noted for its beautiful and diverse architecture.

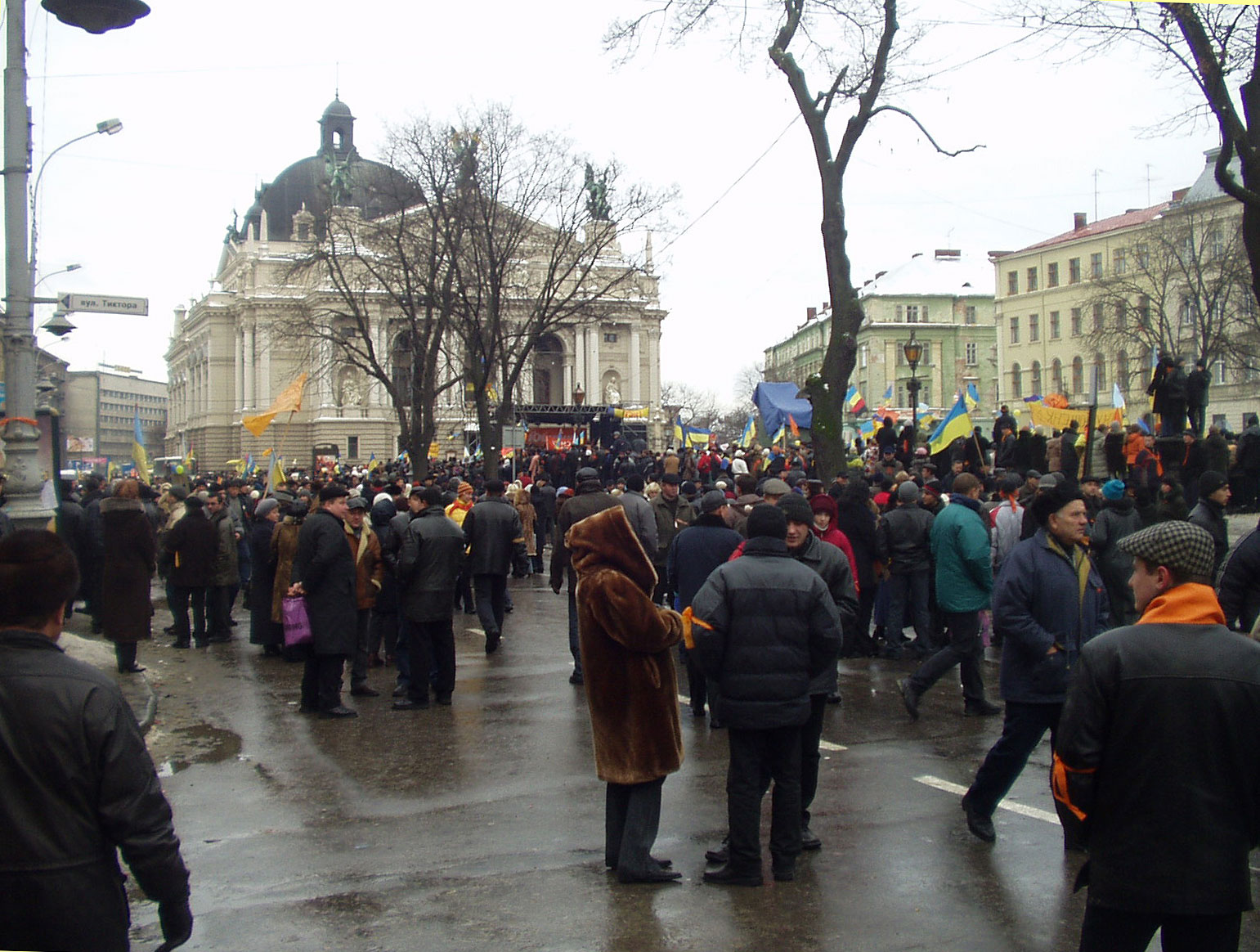
Protesters in Lviv during the 2004 presidential election

The citizens of Lviv strongly supported Viktor Yushchenko during the 2004 Ukrainian presidential election and played a key role in the Orange Revolution. Hundreds of thousands of people would gather in freezing temperatures to demonstrate for the Orange camp. Acts of civil disobedience forced the head of the local police to resign and the local assembly issued a resolution refusing to accept the fraudulent first official results.

Lviv celebrated its 750th year in September 2006. One large event was a light show around the Lviv Opera House.

In support of the Euromaidan movement, Lviv's executive committee declared itself independent of the rule of President Viktor Yanukovych on 19 February 2014.

In 2019, the citizens of Lviv strongly supported Petro Poroshenko over Volodymyr Zelenskyy during the 2019 Ukrainian presidential election. The percentage of votes counted for Poroshenko was more than 90%. Despite this level of support in Lviv, he lost the national vote.

Until 18 July 2020, Lviv was incorporated as a city of oblast significance and the centre of Lviv Municipality. The municipality was abolished in July 2020 as part of the administrative reform of Ukraine, which reduced the number of raions of Lviv Oblast to seven. The area of Lviv Municipality was merged into the newly established Lviv Raion.

=== 2022 Russian invasion of Ukraine ===
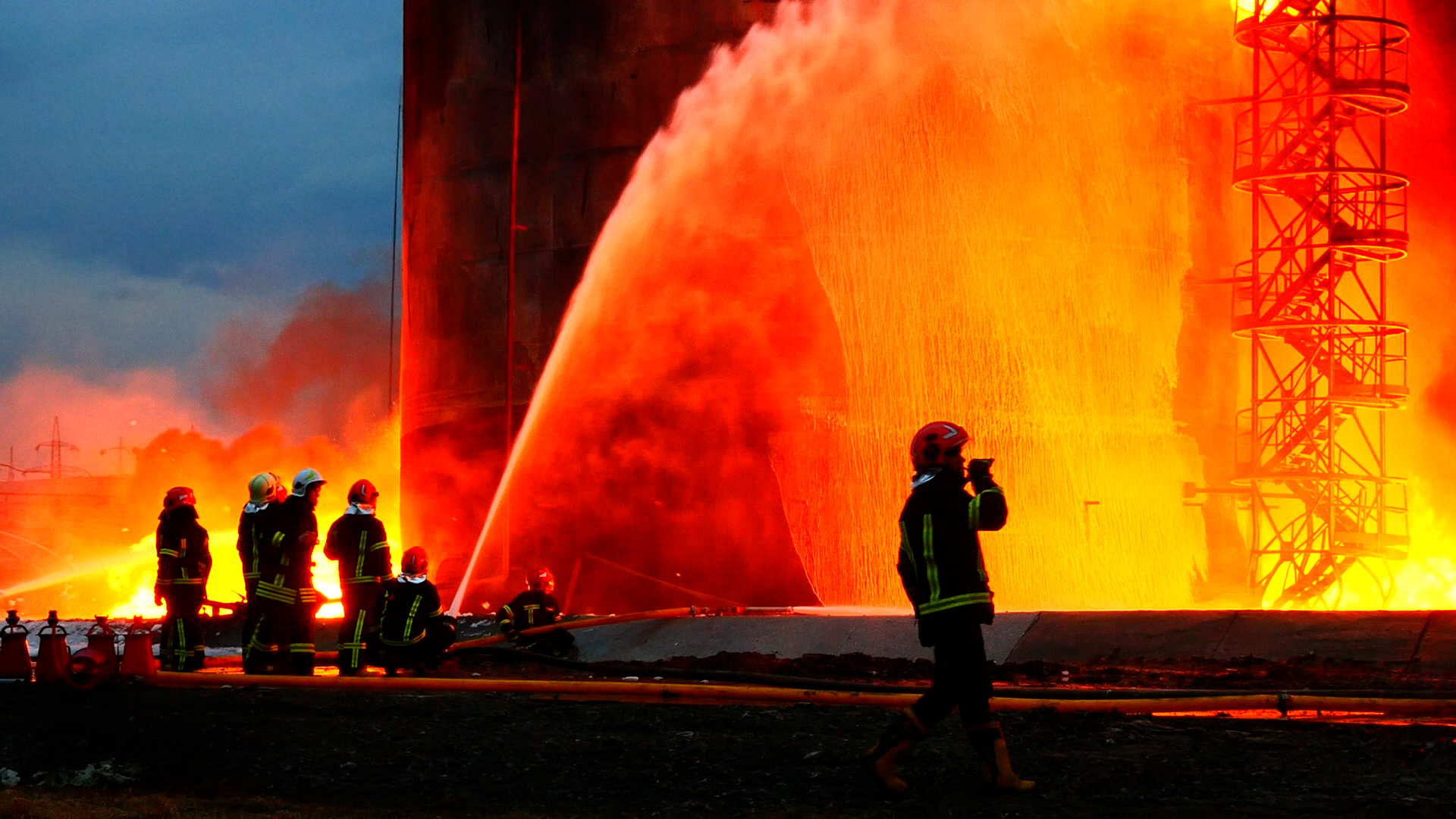
Fire after a Russian strike on a fuel depot in Lviv, March 2022

In February 2022, after the 2022 Russian invasion of Ukraine, Lviv became the nation's de facto western capital as some embassies, government agencies, and media organizations were relocated from Kyiv due to the direct military threat to the capital. Lviv also became a safe haven for the Ukrainians fleeing other parts of the country affected by the invasion, their number exceeding 200,000 by 18 March 2022. A number of them used the city as a stopping point on their way to Poland. Lviv and the larger region around it also served as crucial arms and humanitarian supply route. Bracing for Russian attacks, local government and citizens, helped by Polish and Croatian advisers, worked to protect the city's cultural heritage by erecting makeshift barriers around historical monuments, wrapping statues, and safeguarding art treasures.

During the course of the war, the area in and around Lviv has been struck by Russian missile attacks. Yavoriv military training base was struck on 13 March 2022, the Lviv State Aircraft Repair Plant near the Lviv Danylo Halytskyi International Airport on 18 March 2022, and a fuel depot and other facilities within the city limits on 26 March 2022.

On 18 April 2022, the city was hit by five missile strikes, killing seven civilians and wounding 11, according to mayor Andriy Sadovyi. Regional governor Maksym Kozystkiy said that the targets were military factories and a tyre shop. A hotel housing evacuees was also hit, damaging its windows. The Russian Ministry of Defence claimed that all locations were struck by Russian missiles during the night of 18 April were military targets.

Lviv was targeted during the 10 October 2022 missile strikes on Ukraine, resulting in a city-wide blackout. On 11 October 2022, Sadovyi announced that the city was hit by a missile strike, resulting in a power outage and water supply shortage. On October 5, 2025, the Russian attack on Lviv was the largest of the war in the Lviv region, said governor Maksym Kozytskyi, adding it involved 140 drones and 23 missiles. 5 civilians were killed and dozens were injured.

On the night of 8 January 2026, Russian forces launched an Oreshnik missile from the Kapustin Yar test site towards Lviv. It was the first time Lviv was struck by an Intermediate-range ballistic missile (IRBM) in the Russo-Ukraine War.

== See also ==
- Timeline of Lviv

== Bibliography ==
- Kurtyka, Janusz (2001). Odrodzone Królestwo. Monarchia Władysława Łokietka i Kazimierza Wielkiego w świetle nowszych badań [The Reborn Kingdom. The Monarchy of Władysław Łokietek and Casimir the Great in the Light of Recent Research] (in Polish). Kraków. ISBN 83-88385-07-0.
- Ostrowski, Jan K. (2000). Lwów. Dzieje i sztuka [Lviv. History and art] (in Polish). Kraków.
- Walczy, Łukasz (2002). W sprawie początków Lwowa (PDF). Lwów. Miasto-społeczeństwo-kultura. Vol. IV. pp. 31–32.
- Wyrozumski, Jerzy (1982). Kazimierz Wielki. Ossolineum. ISBN 83-04-01041-0.
