= Saints Peter and Paul Church, Podil =

Coordinates: 50.4644°N 30.5144°E

Saints Peter and Paul Church
- Петропавлівська церква
- Katedra św. Zofii w Kijowie
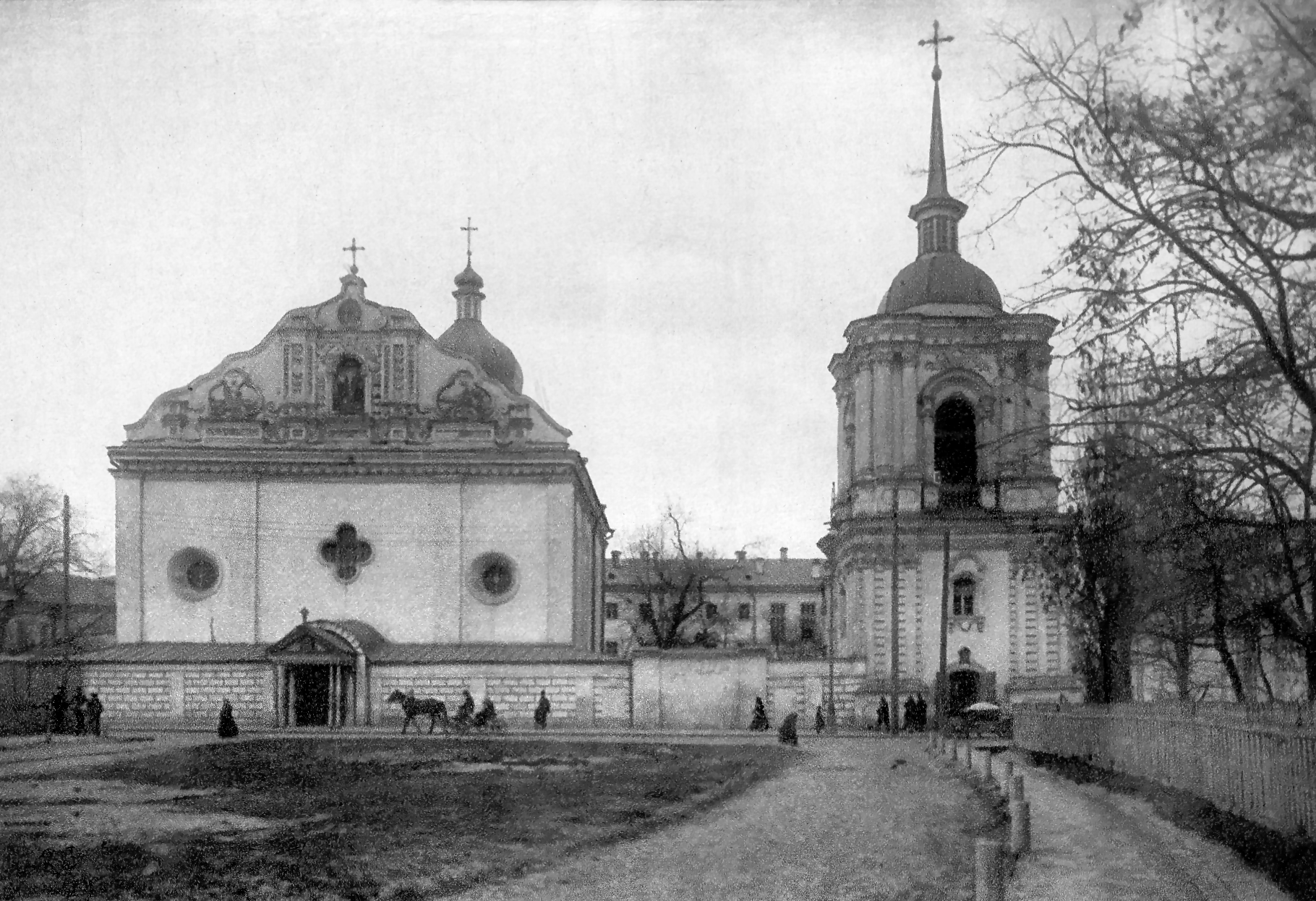
- Saints Peter and Paul Church in 1912.
- Saints Peter and Paul Church
- Location: Podil, Kyiv
- Country: Ukraine
- Denomination: Roman Catholic Church, Russian Orthodox Church

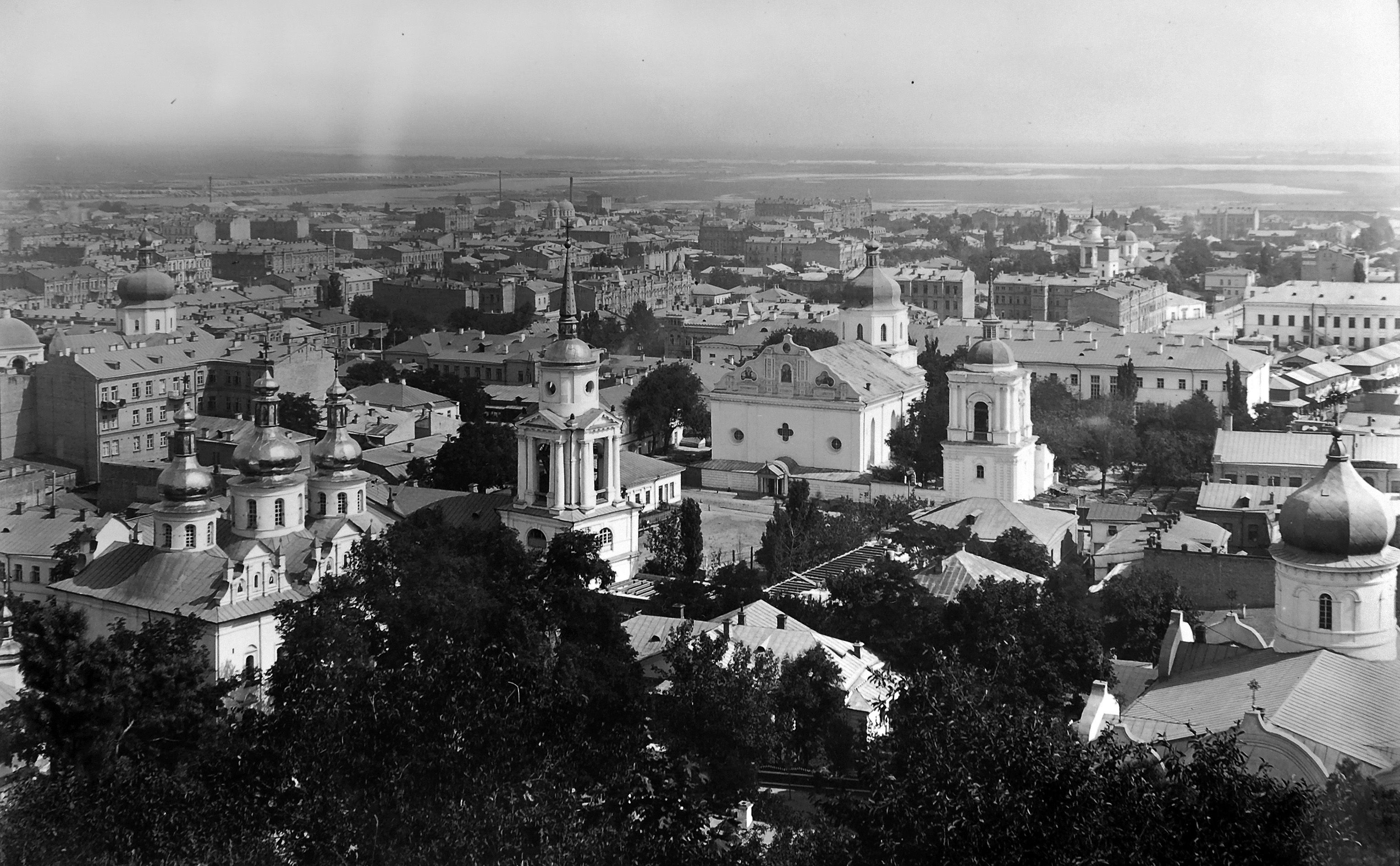
View over the Podil area with Saints Peter and Paul Church in the middle, at the end of the 19th century.

The Saints Peter and Paul Church (Ukrainian: Петропавлівська церква, romanized: Petropavlivska tserkva), also called Catholic Cathedral of St. Sophia (Polish: Katedra św. Zofii w Kijowie, Latin: Sancta Sophia, Capitulo et Canonicis Cathedralis Ecclesiae Kioviencis was a formerly Catholic and then Russian Orthodox cathedral in the Podil district in Kyiv, Ukraine. Built at the end of the 17th century, it was the oldest and most historical Latin cathedral in Kyiv, the seat of the Bishop of the Catholic Church in the Diocese of Kyiv which was part of the metropolis of Lviv since 1412. It was later transformed into an Orthodox church, and then destroyed in 1935 by the Soviet regime,

== Catholic period ==
It began as a wooden chapel burned down in the year 1017.

A brick church was built only between 1614 and 1633 on efforts of Krzysztof Kazimirski within a Dominican monastery. With start of the Khmelnytskyi Uprising, the local Dominican Order was liquidated and the cathedral was robbed. Since 1650s it was used by the Muscovite voivode as a guard house.

== Orthodox period ==
In 1691 Metropolitan Varlaam of Kyiv consecrated the church as an Eastern Orthodox temple, the Church of Saints Peter and Paul. At first it did not have its own clergy and was assigned to the Saint Sophia's Cathedral. It was rebuilt in 1724 and in 1784 it was transformed into a separate temple. In 1744-50 the church was restructured and Ivan Grigorovich-Barsky built a three-story belltower next to the church. In the spring of 1786, Empress Catherine II secularized monasteries, which resulted in the closure of five Kyiv monasteries, including St. Peter and Paul's, where it was planned to open a primary public school, but at the request of Metropolitan Samuel Myslavsky, the monastery was transferred to the community of the Greek Sinai Monastery of St. Catherine in 1787, which allowed the monastery to continue functioning as a Greek Orthodox monastery.

The Saints Peter and Paul Church was damaged during the 1811 Great Podil fire and top level of belltower was taken apart.

In 1832, at the court of the church compound was built the Kyiv-Podil Theological School.

In 1920, the church was closed to worship and its building was planned to be used as a warehouse for the Central Archives of Ukraine. However, around 1935 the church together with its belltower was destroyed by the Soviet regime.

== See also ==
- Roman Catholicism in Ukraine
- Saint Sophia's Cathedral, Kyiv
