= Romanovich =

Romanovich (Russian: Романович) or Romanowicz (Polish version) is a gender-neutral Slavic surname and a patronymic name.

== Surname ==
=== Romanovich ===
- Anatoli Romanovich (born 1979), Russian football player
- Daniel Romanovich (1201-1246, Papal archbishop
- Mstislav Romanovich, Russian noble
- Nikita Romanovich (1522–1586), Muscovite boyar
- Sergei Romanovich (footballer) (born 1984), Russian football player
- Vasilko Romanovich (1203–1269), Russian prince

=== Romanowicz ===
- Aleksander Romanowicz (1871–1933), Russian cavalry general in Russian Imperial and Polish Armies
- Barbara Romanowicz (born 1950), French geophysicist
- Roger Romanowicz (born 1947), Australian football player
- Walter Romanowicz (1918–1986), American football player

== Patronymic name ==
- Anton Romanovich Zhebrak (1901–1965), Russian professor
- Aleks Matsukatov (born 1999), Russian football player
- Alexander Belyaev (1884–1942), Russian science fiction writer
- Alexander Romanovich Bruce (1704–1760), Russian lieutenant general
- Alexander Dovzhenko (psychiatrist) (1918–1955), Russian psychiatrist
- Alexander Drenteln (1820–1888), Russian general
- Alexander Luria (1902–1977), Russian neuropsychologist
- Alexander Vorontsov (1741–1805), Russian chancellor
- Alexandre Prigogine (1913–1991), Russian-born Belgian mineralogist
- Arkadiy Abramovich (born 1993), Russian businessman
- Arkady Rotenberg (born 1951), Russian billionaire businessman
- Berthold Lubetkin (1901–1990), Russian architect
- Boris Romanovich Rotenberg (born 1957), Russian businessman, brother of Arkady
- Borys Hmyria (1903–1969), Russian singer
- Constantin Bakaleinikoff (1896–1966), Russian-born American composer
- Daniil Lunts (1912–1977), Russian KGB agent
- Prince Dimitri Romanov (1926–2016), Russian prince
- Frol Kozlov (1908–1965), Russian politician
- Gavrila Derzhavin (1743–1816), Russian poet
- Grigory Ginzburg (1904–1961), Russian pianist
- Igor Lifanov (born 1965), Russian actor
- Ilya Prigogine (1917–2003), Russian physical chemist
- Ivan Tarkhanov (physiologist) (1846–1908), Georgian physiologist
- Konstantin Eiges (1875–1950), Russian composer
- Kuzma Sinilov (1902–1957), Russian lieutenant general
- Lev Britanishsky (1897–1971), Russian painter
- Maksim Borisko (born 2000), Russian football player
- Mikhail Perlman (1923–2002), Russian gymnast
- Mischa Bakaleinikoff (1890–1960), Russian director
- Nicholas Romanov, Prince of Russia (1922–2014), Russian claimant of the House of Romanov
- Pavel Popovich (1930–2009), Russian cosmonaut
- Pyotr Romanovich Bagration (1818–1876), Russian-Georgian statesman
- Semyon Vorontsov (1744–1832), Russian diplomat
- Roman Kachanov (film director) (born 1967), Russian film director
- Roman Rosen (1847–1921), Russian diplomat
- Ruslan Litvinov (born 2001), Russian football player
- Vasilije Romanovich (c.1700–1773), Russian icon painter
- Vladimir Alekno (born 1966), Russian volleyball player and coach
- Vladimir Romanovich Arsenyev (1948–2010), Russian africanist
- Yegor Spiridonov (born 2001), Russian ice hockey player
- Yevgeny Grishin (speed skater) (1931–2005), Russian speed skater

== Fictional ==
=== Patronymic name ===
- Rodion Raskolnikov, character of Crime and Punishment
