= Mykhailo Dorundiak =

Ukrainian lawyer, public and cultural figure (1857–1907)

- Михайло Григорович Дорундяк
- Born: 1 October 1857; Kidanch, Austrian Empire (now Ukraine)
- Died: 31 July 1907 (aged 49); Borshchiv, Austria-Hungary (now Ukraine)
- Education: University of Lviv, University of Vienna
- Occupations: Lawyer, public and cultural figure

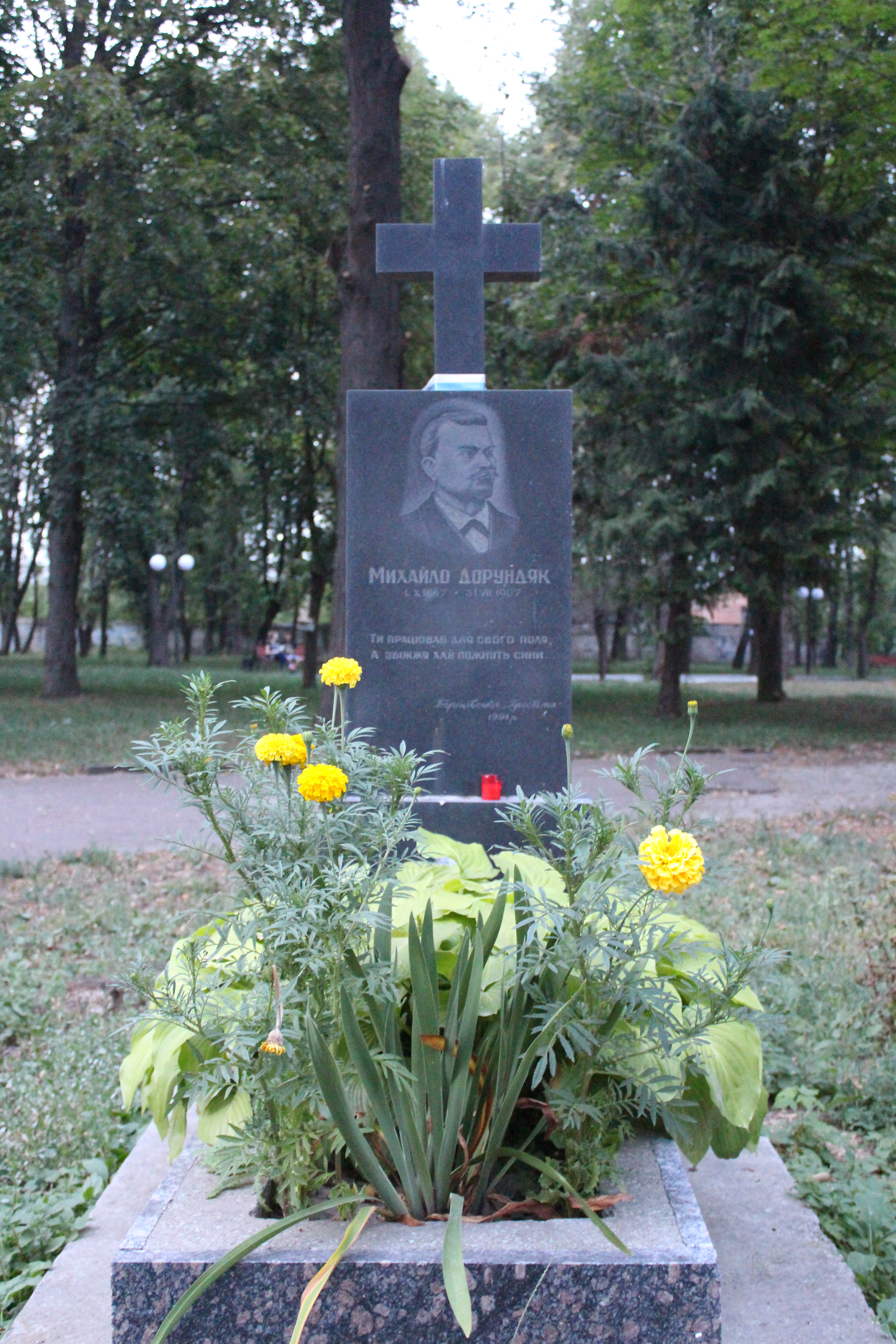
Grave of Mykhailo Dorundiak in Borshchiv

Mykhailo Dorundiak (Ukrainian: Михайло Григорович Дорундяк; 1 October 1857 – 31 July 1907) was a Ukrainian lawyer, public and cultural figure.

== Biography ==
Mykhailo Dorundiak was born on 1 October 1857 in the village of Kidanch, now the Pechenizhyn Hromada of the Kolomyia Raion of the Ivano-Frankivsk Oblast of Ukraine.

In 1877 he graduated from Kolomyia Gymnasium, and in 1881 he graduated from Lviv and Vienna Universities. In 1882–1894, he worked in lawyer's offices in Kosiv and Horodenka in the Stanyslaviv Region (now Ivano-Frankivsk Oblast). In 1891 he became a Doctor of Law.

From July 1894 he lived in Borshchiv, where he started his own law practice. He was the head of the powiat's Prosvita, the founder and head of a credit society, the initiator of the construction of the Ukrainian People's House, a member of the management of the Narodna Torhivlia cooperative and the Dnister Insurance Company.

In the 1897 elections, he organized a county committee, with the support of which Roman Yarosevych was elected ambassador to the Austrian parliament. He provided legal assistance to the peasants during the strikes of 1901–1902, defended them free of charge in trials in Ternopil and Stanyslaviv.

He kept in touch with Mykhailo Hrushevskyi, Ivan Franko, and others.

He was married (1893) to Emilia Okunevska (1862–1894, sister of the lawyer Teofil Okunevskyi). In 1900 he married for the second time to Antonina Kalynovych, with whom he raised his daughter Orysia (1901–1975).

Author of articles in the Lviv and Chernivtsi press.

Dorundiak died on 31 July 1907 in Borshchiv, where he was buried.

== Honoring the memory ==
A street in Borshchiv is named after Mykhailo Dorundiak.

The most complete account of the life of lawyer Mykhailo Dorundiak is in Petro Dovhoshyia book "Uviity v taiemnytsi dukhu. Ivan Franko i Borshchivskyi krai".
