= Vasyl Nahirnyi =

Ukrainian architect, public figure (1848–1921)

- Василь Нагірний
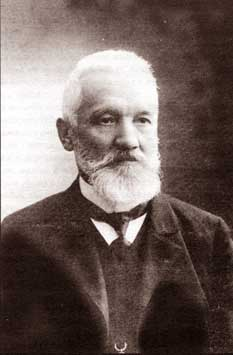
- Born: Vasyl Stepanovych Nahirnyi; 11 January 1848; Hirne, Austrian Empire (now Ukraine)
- Died: 25 February 1921 (aged 73); Lviv
- Education: Lviv Technical Academy, Fédérale Polytechnique de Lausanne.
- Occupations: Architect, public figure

Vasyl Nahirnyi (Ukrainian: Василь Степанович Нагірний; 11 January 1848 – 25 February 1921) was a Ukrainian architect, public figure.

== Biography ==
Vasyl Nahirnyi was born on 11 January 1848 in Hirne, now the Hrabovets-Duliby rural hromada of Stryi Raion, Lviv Oblast, Ukraine.

In 1871 he graduated from the Lviv Technical Academy, and in 1875 from the Fédérale Polytechnique de Lausanne. Nahirnyi lived in Zurich, worked in design offices and government agencies in Switzerland.

From 1882 in Lviv. He co-founded societies, including "Narodna Torhivlia" (1883), "Zoria" (1884), "Dnister" (1892), "Sokil" (1894), "Narodna Hostynytisa", and the Society for the Development of Rus' Art (1898, together with Ivan Trush, Mykhailo Hrushevsky and Yuliian Pankevych). In 1885-1890 he was the editor-in-chief of the newspaper "Batkivshchyna".

=== Family ===
Father of architect Yevhen Nahirnyi, great-grandfather of singer Kvitka Cisyk.

== Works ==
In 1898 he participated in the "First Rus' exhibition of art", where he presented his architectural works.

The author of more than 200 churches (mostly brick), with forms of neo-Romantic and neo-Byzantine styles and techniques of folk wooden architecture. From 1905 he worked together with his son Yevhen.

Nahirnyi is also the author of the People's House in Borshchiv, Ternopil Oblast (1908).

== Memorials ==
On 30 December 2018, a monument to Vasyl Nahirnyi was unveiled in his native village.

== Sources ==
- Бобош Г. Стежками життя та творчості Василя Нагірного (1848 — 1921) // Народознавчі Зошити. — Львів: Інститут народознавства НАН України, 2000. — No. 2. — S. 347–355.
- (in Ukrainian) Дуда І., Пиндус Б., Нагірний Василь Степанович // Ternopil Encyclopedic Dictionary: in 4 v. / editorial board: H. Yavorskyi and other, Ternopil: "Zbruch", 2005, V. 2: К—О, S. 588—589. — ISBN 966-528-199-2.
- Слободян В. Церкви Василя Нагірного // Вісник інституту "Укрзахідпроектреставрація". 1994. No. 2.
- Лев Х., Слободян В., Філевич Н. 100 церков Нагірних. Ч. 1: Церкви В. Нагірного. Л., 2013.
- Нагірний В. З моїх споминів. — Львів, 1935.
