= Olha-Oleksandra Bazhanska-Ozarkevych =

Ukrainian pianist and folklorist (1866–1906)

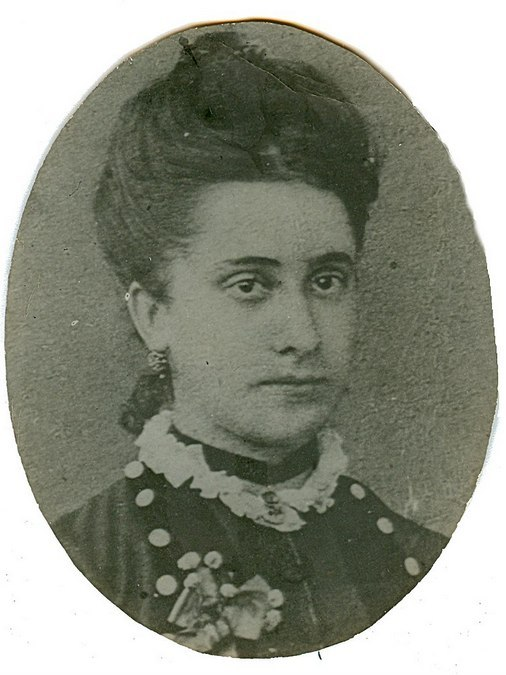
Olha-Oleksandra Bazhanska-Ozarkevych

Olha-Oleksandra Porfyrivna Bazhanska-Ozarkevych (née Bazhanska; 30 December 1866 - 15 July 1906) was a Ukrainian pianist, folklorist, writer, and public figure. Pen names Oksana and Olesya B.

== Early life and education ==
Olha-Oleksandra Porfyrivna Bazhanska was born on 30 December 1866, in Lviv in the family of the Ukrainian Greek Catholic Church priest, composer, musicologist, writer, and folklorist Porfyriy Bazhanskyi. She studied music with her father and with Ivan Gunevich in Lviv. In 1885, she graduated from the Lviv Teachers' Seminary.

== Career ==
=== Music ===
After the graduation, Bazhanska taught to play the piano in the village of Soroky (now Soroky-Lvivski, Pustomytiv district, Lviv region) and in the city of Horodok (now Lviv region).

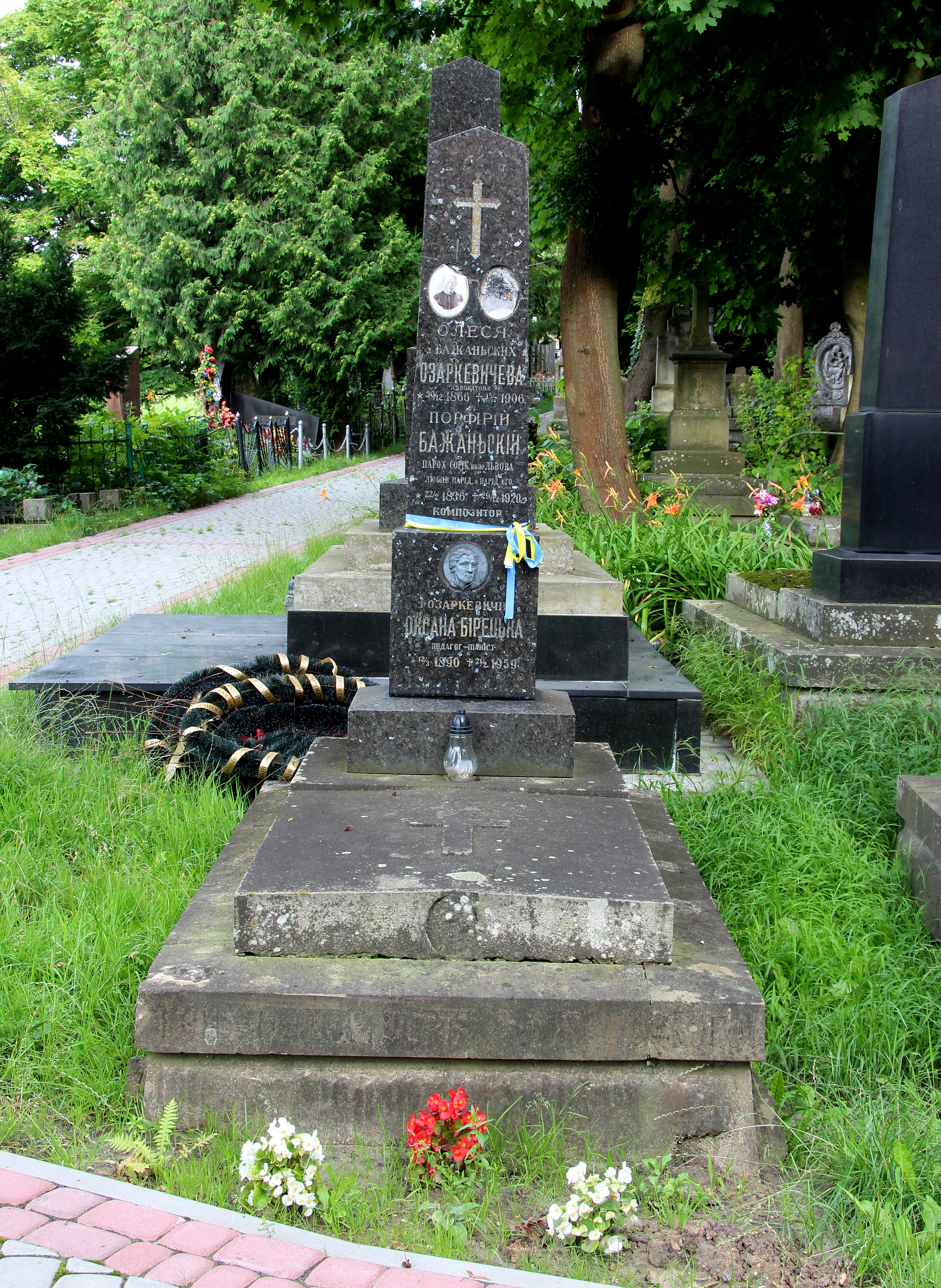
The gravestone of Olha-Oleksandra Bazhanska-Ozarkevych

Bazhanska-Ozarkevych took an active part in the women's movement. In 1891, she became one of the organizers of the "Boyan" musical and choral society in Lviv.

From 1892–1900, she performed as a pianist in concerts of the "Boyan" society dedicated to Taras Shevchenko and Markiyan Shashkevych. She accompanied the singers Solomiya Krushelnytska (1892, 1894, Oy Lyuli, Lyuli and Oh Moon, Moonlight by Mykola Lysenko, In the Grove, Grove by Denys Sichynskyi), Maria Pavlykiv, Ivan Skalisha, and others at concerts in Lviv. Her repertoire included piano works by Ukrainian and foreign composers, including Mykola Lysenko, Frideric Chopin, Ferenc Liszt, and Robert Schumann. According to the definition of the "Encyclopedia of Ukrainian Studies", Olha-Oleksandra Bazhanska is the first Ukrainian professional pianist in Galicia.

Folk songs recorded by Bazhanska were included in the collection Rusky-folk Galician melodies (Lviv, 1905–1912, parts 1–10), compiled by Porfyriy Bazhanskyi.

=== Literary works ===
In 1887, she published the short story Kindrat about the hard fate of a soldier. The same year she published the poem Once Upon a Time in the almanac "Pershyi Vinok". Four years later, in 1891, she published the novel 5.V 1891, dedicated to the fate of a female intellectual in the society of that time in the magazine "Narod". She translated the works of the Polish writer Władysław Orkan (the stories Evenings, Distrust, Yasna Polyana, Over Bird).

Bazhanska-Ozarkevych died on 15 July 1906, aged 39, in Zakopane (now Poland). She was buried in Lviv on field 59 of the Lychakiv cemetery.

== Personal life ==
In 1989, Bazhanska married Longyn Ozarkevych. In 1890 the couple had first their daughter, Olha-Oksana. In 1893, Bazhanska-Ozarkevych had her second daughter, Natalia, who died soon after the birth. In 1895, she gave birth to her son Ivan.

== Commemoration ==
Composer Ostap Nyzhankivskyi dedicated his work Over the Lake (1894) to Bazhanska-Ozarkevych.
