= Klavdia Petrivna =

Ukrainian singer (born 2005)

- Born: Solomiia Opryshko; 13 August 2005 (age 20); Hirne, Lviv Oblast, Ukraine
- Other name: Klavdia Petrivna
- Citizenship: Ukrainian
- Occupation: Singer
- Years active: 2023–present
- Musical career
- Instruments: Piano and vocals

Solomiia Opryshko (Ukrainian: Соломія Опришко; born 13 August 2005), more popularly known by her stage name Klavdia Petrivna (Ukrainian: Клавдія Петрівна) is a Ukrainian singer, songwriter and musician who hid her identity at the beginning of her career. She gained rapid popularity on the social network TikTok. Her tracks have gained millions of plays on YouTube and streaming services. In early 2024, she topped the charts of Ukrainian radio stations with the song "Znaidy mene".

== Biography ==
Solomiia Opryshko was born in Hirne, now the Hrabovets-Duliby rural hromada of the Stryi Raion of Lviv Oblast in Ukraine.

She studied at a music school and graduated from the violin class at the Vasyl Barvinsky Drohobych College of Music in 2024. She played in symphony, chamber, and folk orchestras.

On 30 August and 31 August 2024, Klavdia Petrivna gave her debut solo concerts at the Palace of Sports in Kyiv.

== Personality ==
=== Pseudonym ===
Klavdia Petrivna is a pseudonym borrowed from the heroine of the novel "Zapysky kyrpatoho Mefistofelia" by Ukrainian writer Volodymyr Vynnychenko.

=== Versions of the real name ===
Petrivna hid her identity in the beginning of her career. Some sources said that she is an experienced woman of 35–40 years old, while others said that Klavdia Petrivna is a young girl or woman. A theory suggested that her song lyrics are created using artificial intelligence. There was also a belief among fans that the singer is a well-known personality. The singer's team reacted to these theories in different ways. They fueled discussions around the theory of artificial intelligence by using ambiguous text in the description below the official videos or on the artist's pages, while at the same time, label director Kateryna Shevchenko says in an interview that Klavdia was young and still studying at a music college.

According to the Ukrainian singer Osty, Klavdia Petrivna decided to become an incognito singer not for the sake of PR, but because of shyness and fear of being disgraced in case of failure. Petrivna loves Volodymyr Ivasiuk's work and French songs, which is where she draws inspiration from.

== Discography ==
=== Albums ===
- 2024: "Yide Dah"

=== Extended plays ===
- 2023: "Berezhy mene"
- 2023: "Zyma"
- 2025: "Intymna liryka"

=== Singles ===
- 2023: "Imperatory"
- 2023: "Znaidy mene" (1st place in FDR Charts)
- 2023: "Uzhe svitaie"
- 2023: "Chorni Bili" (with Osty)
- 2024: "Snih" (with Osty)
- 2024: "Ya tobi brekhala"
- 2024: "Baraban" (with Artem Pyvovarov; 1st place in FDR Charts)
- 2024: "Teatr"
- 2024: "Namaliui meni nich"
- 2024: "Yide Dah" (with Masha Kondratenko)
- 2024: "Orbity" (with Tvorchi)
- 2024: "Ne Liakai" (with Osty)
- 2024: "Zyma"
- 2025: "Nevzhe"

== Awards ==
Year	Subject	Category	Awards	Result	Ref
2023	Klavdia Petrivna	Best New Artist	Culture Ukraine	Won	
2024	Klavdia Petrivna	Debut of the year	Zolota Zoria	Won	
