= Ukrainian cooperative movement =

Sociopolitical movement in Ukraine

The Ukrainian cooperative movement addressed the economic plight of the Ukrainian people through the creation of financial, agricultural and trade cooperatives that enabled Ukrainians to pool their resources, obtain less expensive loans and insurance, and to pay less for products such as farm equipment. The cooperatives played a major role in the social and economic mobilization of the Ukrainian people, most of whom were peasants. First begun in the 1860s, after 1917 the development of cooperatives was stunted by Soviet policies, but continued in Polish-ruled Western Ukraine, where by 1939 cooperatives had 700,000 members, employing 15,000 Ukrainians. The cooperatives were shut down by the Soviet authorities when western Ukraine was annexed by the Soviet Union in 1939. However, they continued to exist and flourish among Ukrainian emigrants and their descendants in the Ukrainian diaspora in North and South America, Europe and Australia.

== History ==
=== Under Russian rule ===
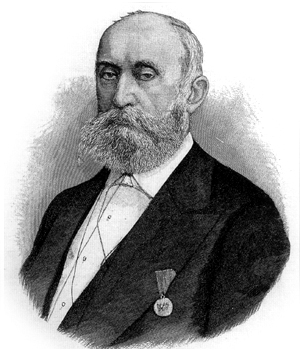
Portrait of Hryhoriy Galagan, one of the founders of Ukrainian cooperative movement in the Russian Empire

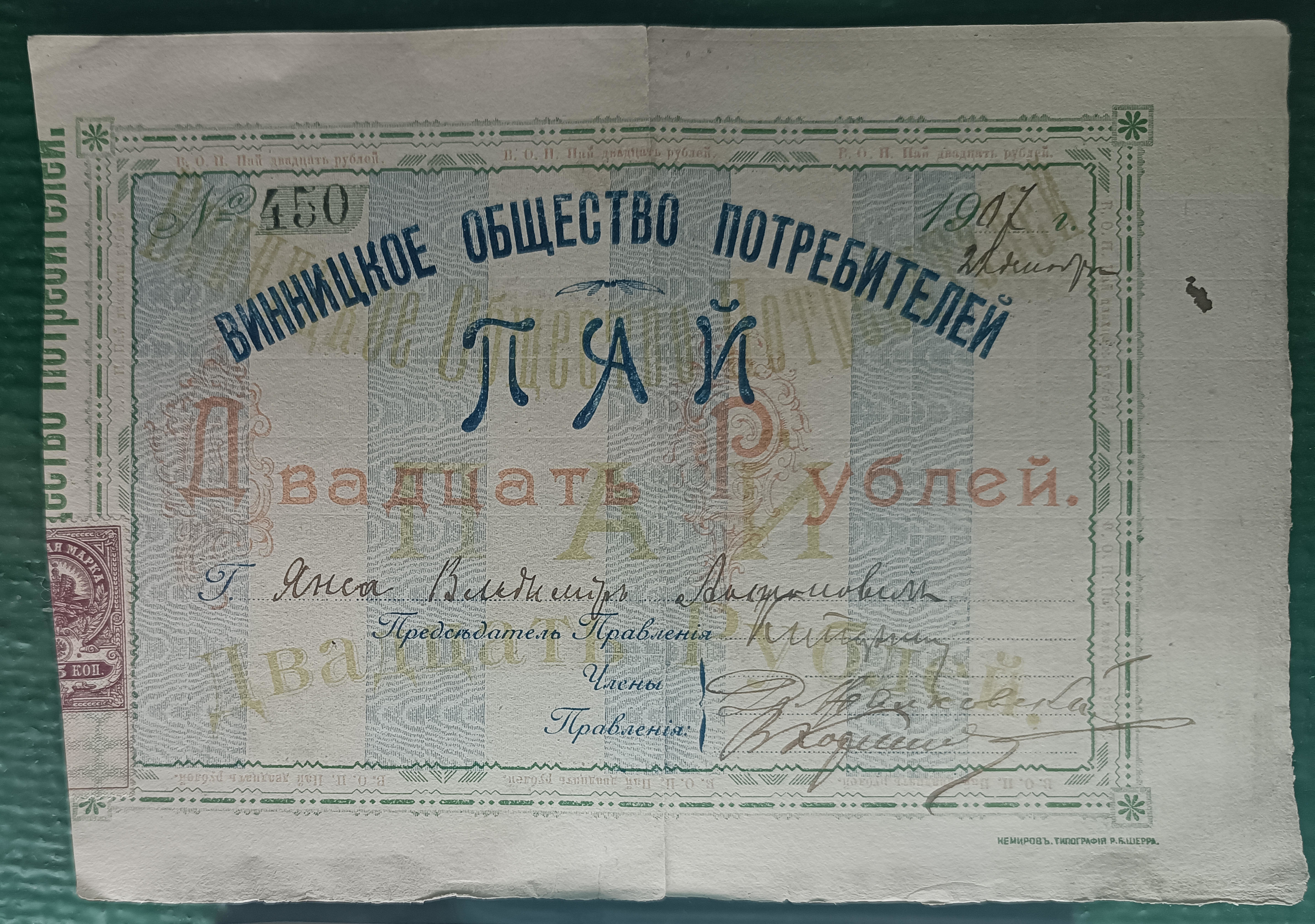
20-Ruble share of the Vinnitsa Coop, 1907.

The beginnings of cooperative movement in Ukrainian lands ruled by the Russian Empire belong to the 1860s. The first consumer cooperative was formed in Kharkiv in 1866 at the initiative M. Ballin. In 1869-1871 credit unions were established in Hadiach and Sokyryntsi, both in Poltava Governorate, by Hryhoriy Galagan. However, until the 1890s the development of cooperative movement under Russian rule was slow due to lack of popular initiative, deficient law and hurdles presented by authorities. During that period many cooperatives were supported by zemstvo organs. The cooperative movement became more active after the adoption of a special law in 1897, which allowed the approval of cooperatives' statutes by local governors, not by the central government as it used to be before, as well as the 1895 law on small-scale credit.

After 1905, Ukrainian governorates of Poltava, Kyiv and Podolia took leading positions in the whole Russian Empire in respect to the number of cooperative societies existing in their territories. First cooperative unions in Ukraine emerged in 1901 in Berdiansk, in 1908 in Kyiv and in 1910 (?) in Vinnytsia. However, in 1913 those unions were dissolved, and replaced with the "South Russian Consumer Society" in Kharkiv, which operated as a filial of the Moscow Union of Consumer Societies. In the same year the 2nd All-Russian Congress of Cooperatives took place in Kyiv, also involving representatives from Western Ukraine. Among prominent activists of the Ukrainian cooperative movement under Russian rule were V. Domanytsky, O. Yurkevych, Khrystofor Baranovsky, Borys Martos, P. Pozharsky, Y. Voloshynovsky, Mykola Stasiuk, M. Levytsky and others.

In Volhynia and Podolia a big role in the cooperative movement during the time of the Russian Empire was played by the monarchist Union of the Russian People, whose ideologists saw cooperation as a way of establishing economic dominance of the Orthodox population over Jews and other foreigners. In 1912 out of 204 cooperatives active in Volhynia 24 were created by the Union of the Russian People. In 1911 a credit bank was established by the Black Hundred activists in Pochaiv. In Kholm Governorate the cooperative movement was organized by a local Orthodox brotherhood. By 1917, 7,000 cooperative societies were active in Ukrainian governorates of the Russian Empire, serving 9 million inhabitants.

=== Under Austrian rule ===
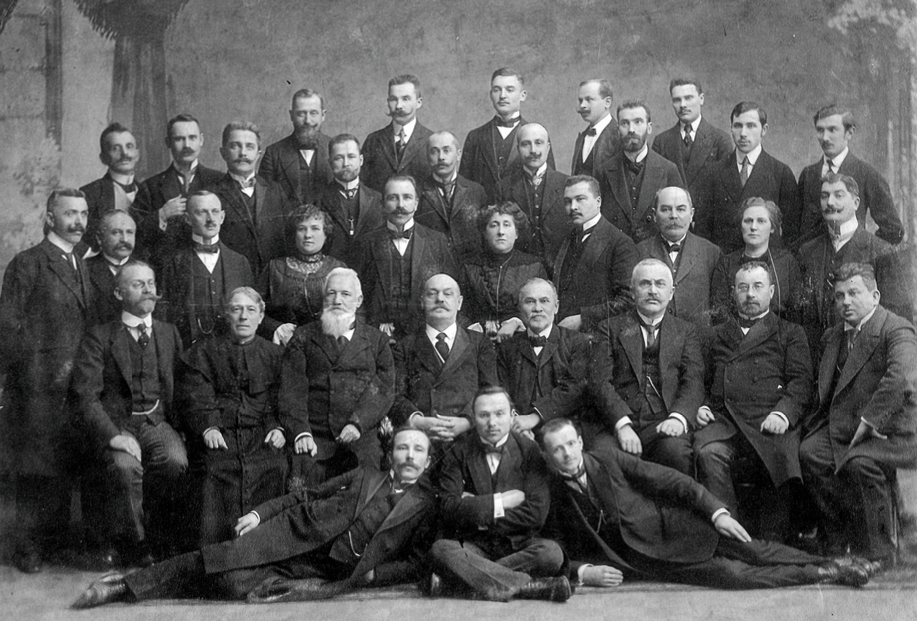
Members of Narodna Torhivlia cooperative in Lviv, 1913

The Ukrainian cooperative movement in Galicia, a western Ukrainian region that was part of Austria-Hungary, originated in the 1870s. Initially, the Ukrainian Prosvita society which had been dedicated to educational and cultural efforts attempted to organize credit unions, stores and warehouses. Its ability to do so was limited, however, by lack of experience in economic matters. The need for an experienced organizer was fulfilled by Vasyl Nahirny, a Ukrainian Galician architect and public figure, one of the "parents" of the cooperative movement in Galicia, who had spent a decade in Switzerland studying that nation's well-developed cooperative systems. In 1883 he organized Narodna Torhivlia ("People's Trade"), whose goal was to buy and sell products in large quantities, eliminate middlemen, and pass the savings on to the Ukrainian villagers. Through this cooperative Nahirny hoped to familiarize Ukrainians with commerce.

Many other cooperatives followed. In 1899, Silsky Hospodar, whose aim was to teach the peasants modern farming methods, was founded. By 1913 it had 32,000 members. Dnister, an insurance company, was established in Lviv and by 1907 had 213,000 policyholders. Most important, however, was the rise of Ukrainian credit unions. Although some existed as early as 1874, the Vira credit union was the first to be stable and well-regulated. Typically charging approximately 10% interest for loans, hundreds of credit unions sprung up throughout Austrian-ruled Ukraine. They helped put traditional moneylenders out of business. In 1904, a central association of Ukrainian cooperatives was formed, which had 550 institutional affiliates and 180,000 individual members.

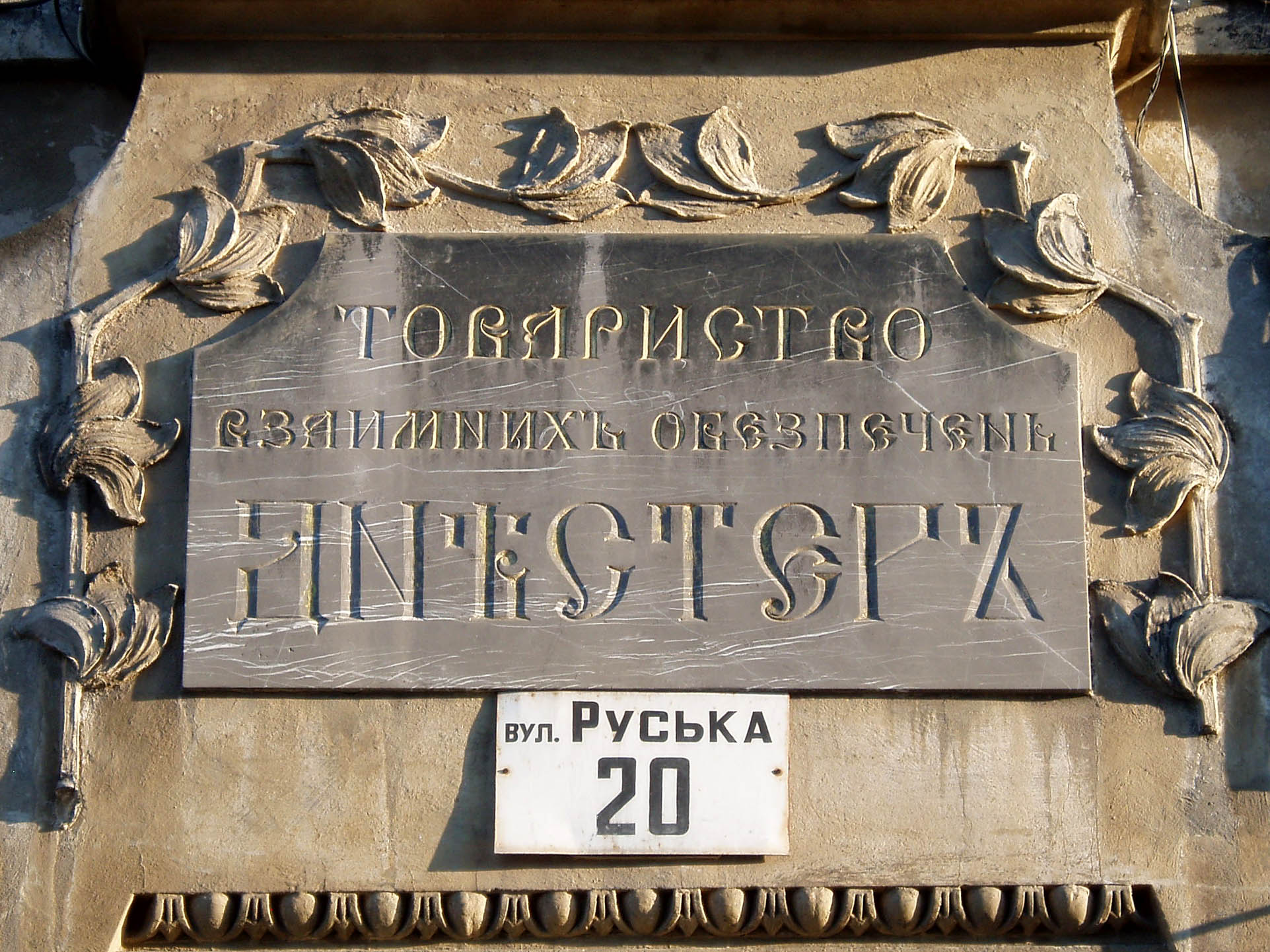
Sign of the Dnister credit society on a building in Lviv

The Ukrainian Greek Catholic Church and its clergy were heavily involved in the cooperative movement, and an association of priests formed whose focus was on improving the peasants' socioeconomic conditions. Many priests took part in organizing cooperatives. The Church's leader, Andrei Sheptytsky, taught that the poor needed more than merely money and that the educated or well off had a duty to help the poor learn how to raise themselves from their circumstances - "teach them, show them how to improve their lot."

The rise of the cooperative movement in late 19th century Galicia had several effects. It helped to bring about a close and harmonious relationship between the intelligentsia of western Ukraine and the peasantry, something that the intelligentsia in Russian-ruled Ukraine was not able to accomplish. Because the cooperative movement was largely the project of Ukrainophiles (those western Ukrainians with a patriotic Ukrainian national orientation), its practical help to the Ukrainian population contributed to its allegiance to the Ukrainian national movement rather than to the competing pro-Russian orientation. Indeed, improvement in economic standards developed concurrently with the increase in Ukrainian national consciousness. Because the professions of moneylending and shopkeeping had traditionally been Jewish vocations in western Ukraine, the cooperative movement also created financial hardship for the local Jewish community, by eliminating many Jewish jobs. The financial hardship caused antagonism between the two communities and was a cause for Jewish emigration from Galicia.

=== After the 1917 revolution ===
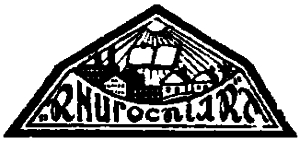
Logo of Knyhospilka from 1925

With the Revolution of 1917, Ukrainian cooperation started separating from the Russian centre, benefitting from the new cooperative law issued by the Provisional Government. In 1917 and 1918 three all-Ukrainian cooperative congresses took place, which led to the establishment of the Ukrainian Central Cooperative Committee directed by B. Martos and overseen by a council headed by M. Tuhan-Baranovsky. Between 1917 and 1919, despite the war, the number of cooperatives in Ukraine increased from 9,200 to 22,300. The biggest numer of cooperatives existed in Kharkiv region and Podillia. Cooperatives played a key role in supplies of the Ukrainian People's Army during the Ukrainian War of Independence. Borys Martos, one of the most authoritative members of the cooperative movement, spent some time as head of government of the Ukrainian People's Republic.

By the early 1920s around 60% of the Ukrainian population were members of consumer cooperatives. During this period six all-Ukrainian central cooperatives were active in different branches of the economy: Dniprosoyuz consumer society (led by B. Martos), Ukrainbank credit union (Kh. Baranovskyi), Tsentral agricultural society (K. Matsiyevych), Trudsoyuz (All-Ukrainian Union of Production Cooperatives), Strakhsoyuz (insurance cooperative) and Knyhospilka (publishers' cooperative). In 1919 a Cooperative Institute was established in Kyiv. During the years of War Communism all cooperatives were united by authorities into "consumer communes", subjected to the central government and the army. Membership in those communes was compulsory for all workers and state servants, most of them living in cities, but native Ukrainian cooperation continued to operate in rural areas. Starting from 1924 the cooperative system was liberalized as part of the New Economic Policy. Cooperation was supported by Soviet authorities as an alternative to private businessmen and kulaks, receiving state orders and subsidies. In 1925 consumer cooperation was separated from other cooperative organizations and put under the management of Ukoopspilka. First construction cooperatives emerged during that time.

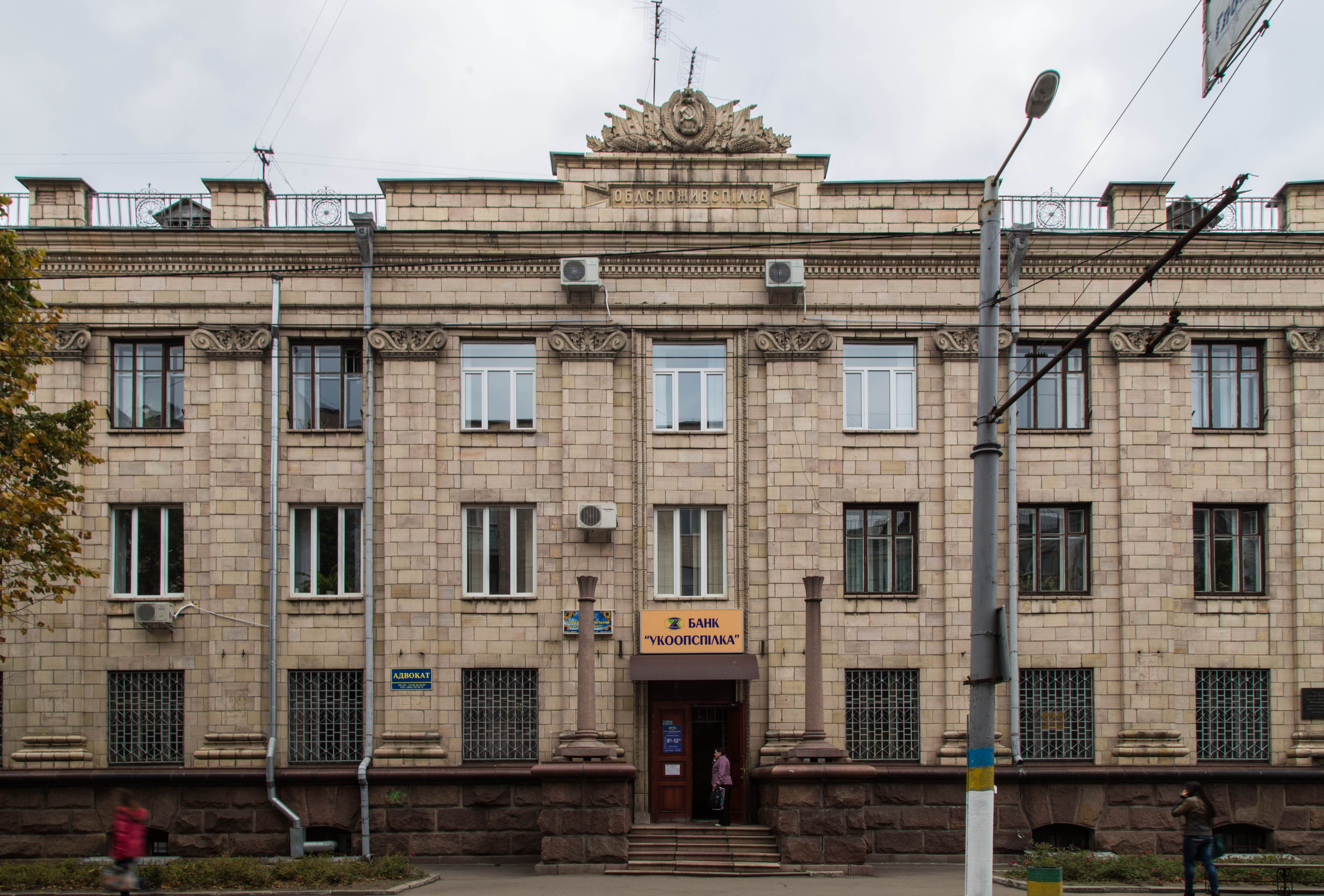
Branch of Ukoopspilka in Zhytomyr

The cooperative movement was an important element in Ukrainian national consciousness, so it was hit especially hard by the Soviet repressions during the 1930s, with many of its members being accused of nationalism. Starting from 1930, the state established prices of goods sold or produced by cooperatives, and subjected them to five-year plans. New high taxes were introduced for cooperatives, and after 1936 they were allowed to distribute only 20% of total profits among their members. As a result of collectivization, agricultural cooperatives were transformed into a system of collective farms. Starting from 1932, specialized central cooperative unions were gradually dissolved, and in 1937 construction cooperation was liquidated. Between 1929 and 1940 the share of cooperative in trade decreased from 86% to 29%. In rural areas consumer cooperation became an instrument of state monopoly on trade with peasants.

During the German occupation of Ukraine in 1941-1944 Ukoopspilka was revived, and in 1946 Soviet government issued a decree which stimulated the development of cooperatives. However, after the currency reform of 1947 cooperative activities were once again strictly subjected to the state plan, which led to their decline in urban areas. In 1956 industrial cooperatives were liquidated with some minor exceptions. At the same time, consumer cooperation improved its standing in villages.

=== Under Polish rule ===
After Austria-Hungary collapsed following the First World War, in 1918 western Ukrainians declared an independent state that was conquered and absorbed by Poland in 1919. This dramatically widened the scope of the Ukrainian cooperative movement. No longer merely a tool for economic progress, cooperatives came to be seen as a school for self-government and a method of economic self-defence against the Polish occupiers. The movement was particularly supported by western Ukrainians' largest and most significant political party, the Ukrainian National Democratic Alliance. Many western Ukrainian veterans took part in the movement, claiming that "by working in the cooperatives we are once again the nation's soldiers." Every bit of capital that stayed in Ukrainian hands was seen as a victory against the Polish enemy. The cooperative organization grew and became elaborately organized. Credit Unions were united into the Tsentrobank ("Central Bank"). Narodnia Torhivlia (People's Trade") brought together urban retailers. Dairy cooperatives united to form Maslosoyuz, which included dairies supplied by over 200,000 farms. It dominated the western Ukrainian and even much of the central Polish market, and exported to Austria and Czechoslovakia. Women had their own cooperative, which by 1936 included 36,000 members. It taught women how to operate cooperatives and nursing schools, and established a cooperative that helped to popularize and sell folk art made at home.

All of these organizations were further subordinated into an umbrella organization called the Audit Union of Ukrainian Cooperatives (RUSK). The number of Ukrainian cooperatives in Galicia grew from 580 in 1921 to 2,500 in 1928 and approximately 4,000 by 1939. Membership on the eve of the second world war was estimated at 700,000 people, and the cooperatives employed over 15,000 Ukrainians.

The Polish government was alarmed by the growth of Ukrainian cooperatives and attempted to limit them by supporting Polish cooperatives and creating problems through allegations of hygiene code violations or incorrect filing of reports. In 1934, the Polish government passed a law forcing Ukrainian cooperatives outside Galicia to unite with Polish ones. Despite such tactics, Ukrainians had twice as many cooperatives per capita than did Poles.

When the Soviet Union annexed western Ukraine in 1939, the Soviet authorities liquidated most Ukrainian community institutions, including Ukrainian cooperatives.

=== Outside Ukraine ===
Western Ukrainians brought cooperatives with them as they emigrated to North and South America, western Europe and Australia. Credit unions served the purpose of offering personal and business loans that Ukrainian immigrants would have otherwise have had difficulty obtaining from other financial institutions. The success of the Ukrainian credit unions is reflected in the fact that by the late 1990s, Ukrainian credit unions in the United States alone had assets of 1.1 billion dollars. Ten years later, this had grown to 2.146 billion dollars in assets held by 17 Ukrainian American Credit Unions. In 2006, 10 Ukrainian credit unions in Canada reported assets of 1.2 billion dollars CDN. These credit unions continue the Ukrainian cooperative movement's mission of service to the Ukrainian community. In 2007, Ukrainian American credit unions donated over 3 million dollars in support of Ukrainian community organizations.

== In modern Ukraine ==
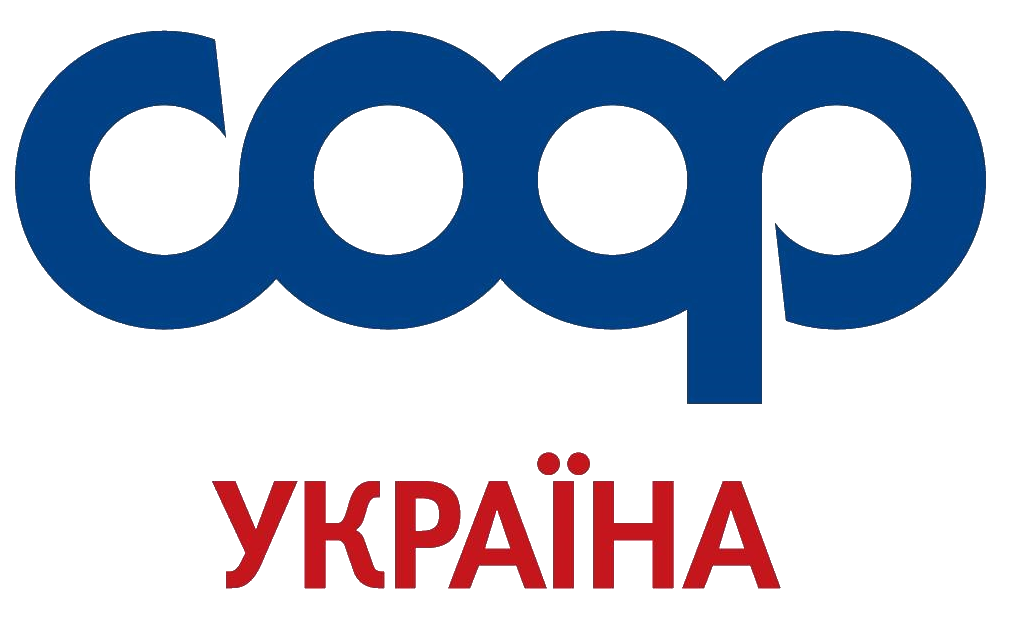
Modern logo of Ukoopspilka, the main representative of consumer cooperatives in Ukraine

In modern Ukraine cooperation among agricultural producers suffers due to the lack of information among the general population, which tends to mistake cooperatives for collective farms, as well as excessive bureaucracy. According to the director of Lviv Agricultural Counselling Service, among 543 villages in Lviv region, which used to be the centre of Ukrainian cooperative movement before WW2, only in 27 locals were enthusiastic about creating cooperatives. One notable exception to this trend is Zabolottsi rural hromada, whose inhabitants established a milk production cooperative with the aid of local authorities and Canadian donors.

== See also ==
- Agricultural cooperative
- Cooperative
- Ukrainian National Democratic Alliance
- Khrystofor Baranovsky
