= Hirne, Lviv Oblast =

Rural locality in Lviv Oblast, Ukraine

Hirne Гірне
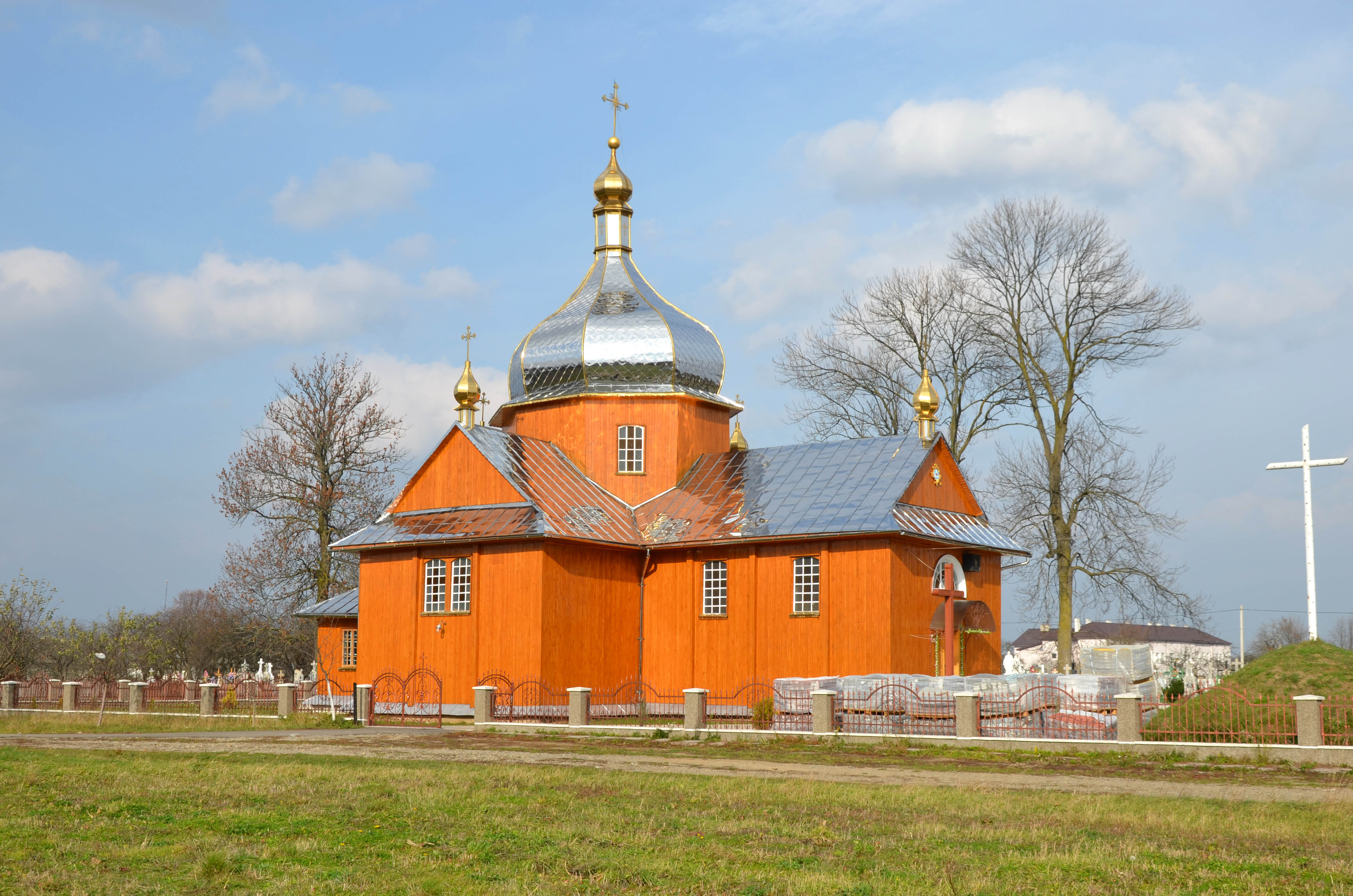
- Church of the Intercession

- Location in Lviv Oblast Hirne (Ukraine)
- Coordinates: 49°10′50″N 23°44′3″E
- Country: Ukraine
- Oblast: Lviv Oblast
- Raion: Stryi Raion
- Hromada: Hrabovets-Duliby rural hromada
- Time zone: UTC+2 (EET)
  - Summer (DST): UTC+3 (EEST)
- Postal code: 82468

Hirne (Ukrainian: Гірне) is a village in the Hrabovets-Duliby rural hromada of the Stryi Raion of Lviv Oblast in Ukraine.

== History ==
The first written mention of the village was in 1472.

On 30 December 2018, a monument of Vasyl Nahirnyi was unveiled in the village.

== Religion ==
- Church of the Intercession (1862, wooden).

== Notable residents ==
- Edward Kozak (1902–1992), Ukrainian cartoonist, humor writer, publisher, designer
- Vasyl Nahirnyi (1848–1921), Ukrainian architect, public figure
- Klavdia Petrivna (Solomiia Opryshko), Ukrainian singer, songwriter and musician

== Sources ==
- "Hurnie". Geographical Dictionary of the Kingdom of Poland (in Polish). 3. Warszawa: Kasa im. Józefa Mianowskiego. 1882. p. 221.
