= Maslosojuz =

Maslosojuz or Maslosoiuz (real name: Association of Dairy Cooperatives) was a Ukrainian dairy cooperation, founded in Stryj in 1904/05. At the beginning it was a branch of Prosvita, and in 1907 it was renamed into National Dairy Union Maslosojuz. By 1914, it united around 100 smaller dairy cooperations, which handled around 7.5 mln liters of milk from Ukrainian farmers in eastern Galicia. The founders of Maslosojuz were: Yevhen Olesnytsky, Ivan Bachynsky, Ostap Nyzhankivsky, and Lev Horalevych.

After World War I, Maslosojuz was recreated in 1924, within boundaries of newly created Second Polish Republic. The cooperation quickly grew, with several professionals being employed. Its turnover was around 12 million zlotys (as for 1938), and export of butter reached 423,000 kilograms (as for 1935). Products of Maslosojuz were available across whole territory of the Second Polish Republic. In the city of Lwow itself, in the 1930s, Maslosojuz had five stores. As leading Polish daily Ilustrowany Kurier Codzienny wrote on 15 January 1937: "The products of Maslosojuz are well known across the nation, and the corporation itself controls all dairy markets of former Eastern Galicia".

In 1939, Polish authorities incorporated Maslosojuz into the so-called Dairy Cooperation. After Polish September Campaign, it ceased to exist. Maslosojuz returned in 1941, and was active during German occupation. Finally, it was closed by the Soviets in 1944.

Before the Second World War, "Maslosoyuz" already united 500,000 of all 800,000 Western Ukrainian farms, that is almost every Ukrainian farm.

== See also ==
- Ukrainian cooperative movement
