= Masha Kondratenko =

Ukrainian singer-songwriter

Masha Kondratenko Маша Кондратенко
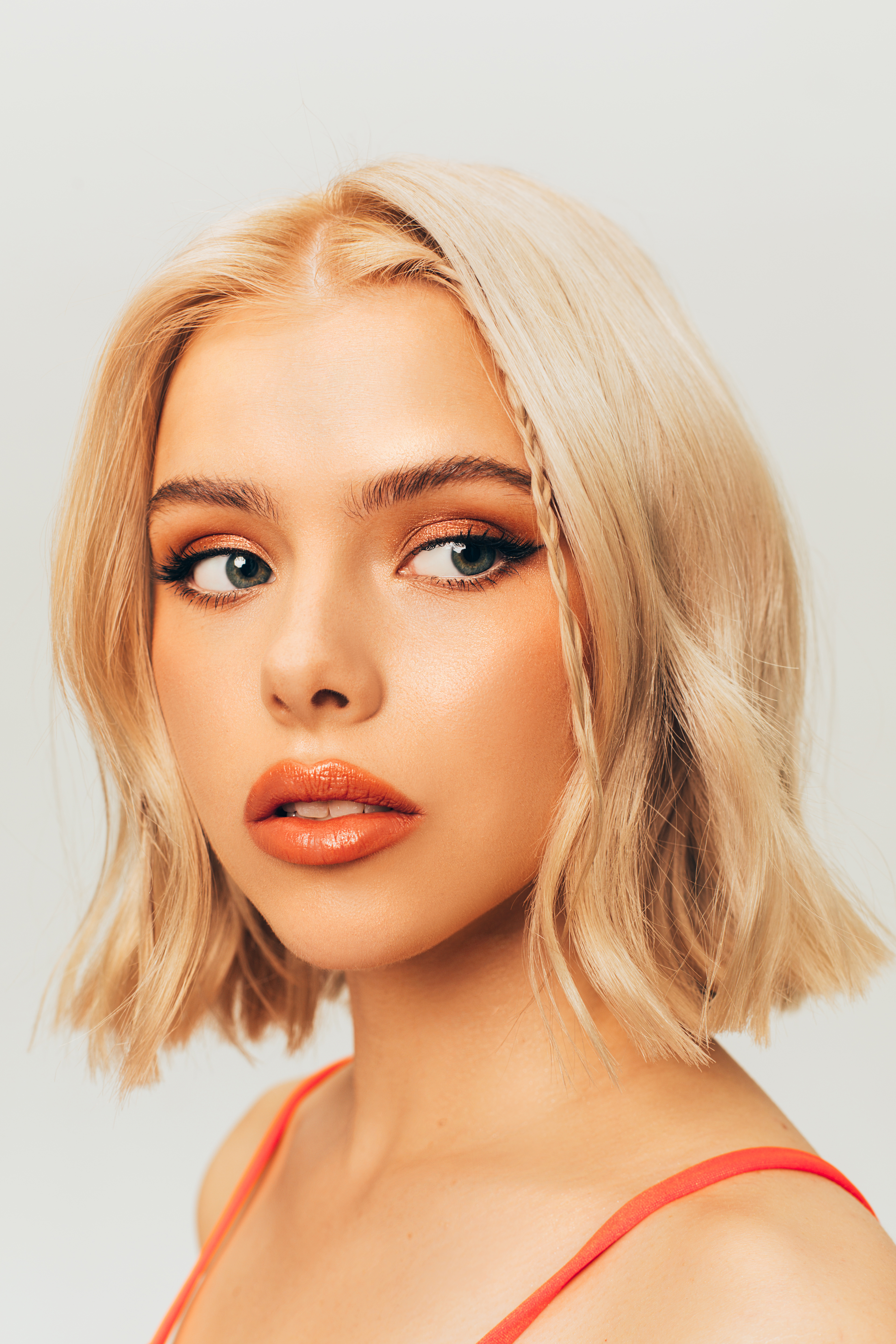

Background information
- Also known as: Masha Kondratenko, Masha Crush, Marichka, Magiс
- Born: Mariia Ihorivna Kondratenko; 5 December 1999 (age 26); Shostka, Sumy Oblast, Ukraine
- Years active: 2021–present

Mariia Ihorivna Kondratenko (Ukrainian: Марія Ігорівна Кондратенко; born 5 December 1999), more popularly known by her stage name Masha Kondratenko, is a Ukrainian actress and singer. Was composing under many pseudonyms, among which were Magic, Marichka and Masha Krash.

== Career ==
Kondratenko rose to prominence after featuring in the 2018 TV series The School where she played a schoolgirl, Sonya. She was a finalist in the tenth season of the talent show Holos Krainy in 2020. Her ironic Europop song "Vanka Vstanka", released in 2022, has been widely remixed and re-used as a backing track to footage of the war during the Russian invasion of Ukraine. Masha was a candidate to represent Ukraine at Eurovision 2025 with the song “No Time To Cry”.

== Discography ==
=== Singles ===
Title	Year	Peak chart positions
Title	Year	UKR Air.
"Malaia" (Малая)	2021	—
"Chekaiu na tebe" (Чекаю на тебе)	2022	—
"Vanka-vstanka" (Ванька-встанька)	2022	1
"Liubov sylnisha" (Любов сильніша) featuring ENLEO	2022	—
"Vedmedi-Balalaiky" (Ведмеді-Балалайки) featuring Mashukovsky	2022	19
"Ne khody" (Не ходи)	2023	—
"Stabilno parshyvo" (Стабільно паршиво)	2023	—
"Liuli-liuli" (Люлі-люлі)	2023	6
"Na hori" (На горі)	2023	—
"Vohnyk-vohnyk" (Вогник-вогник)	2023	—
"Khto tse taka" (Хто це така)	2024	—
"un deux trois"	2024	—
"Bili nochi" (Білі ночі) featuring OSTY	2024	—
"Yide dakh" (Їде дах) featuring Klavdia Petrivna	2024	5
"Dym" (Дим)	2024	—
"Vyvchy mene" (Вивчи мене)	2024	—
"Pid viknamy" (Під вікнами)	2024	—
"Psevdo" (Псевдо)	2024	—
"Mala" (Мала)	2024	—
"Podzvony meni" (Подзвони мені)	2024	—
"Zavedu kota" (Заведу кота)	2024	—
"Divchynka" (Дівчинка) featuring Irina Bilyk	2024	—
"No Time to Cry"	2025	—
"Мухи (Flies)"	2025	—
