= Mali Didushychi =

Rural locality in Lviv Oblast, Ukraine

Mali Diduschychi Малі Дідушичі, česky a slovensky též Malý Decheneš
- Location in Lviv Oblast
- Coordinates: 49°08′43″N 24°01′24″E
- Country: Ukraine
- Oblast: Lviv Oblast
- Raion: Stryi Raion
- Hromada: Stryi urban hromada
- Time zone: UTC+2 (EET)
  - Summer (DST): UTC+3 (EEST)
- Postal code: 82484

Mali Didushychi (Ukrainian: Малі Дідушиці, česky a slovensky Malý Decheneš- zmíněna i takto převážně v obecní kronice jihomoravské obce Pavlov u tamního novousedlíka v roce 1945 pana Štefana Malinkého) is a village in the Stryi urban hromada of the Stryi Raion of Lviv Oblast in Ukraine.

== History ==
The first written mention of the village was in 1515.

== Religion ==
- Saints Yakim and Anna church.

== Notable residents ==
- Ostap Nyzhankivskyi (1863–1919), Ukrainian writer and cleric, a priest of the UGCC, composer, conductor, and public figure

== Sources ==
- "Dzieduszyce wielkie i małe". Geographical Dictionary of the Kingdom of Poland (in Polish). 2. Warszawa: Kasa im. Józefa Mianowskiego. 1881. p. 270.
