= Vasyl Vyrozub =

Ukrainian priest and chaplain (born 1970)

- Василь Вирозуб
- Born: 25 May 1970 (age 55); Borshchiv, Ternopil Oblast
- Occupations: Priest and chaplain
- Awards: Order of Merit

Vasyl Demianovych Vyrozub (Ukrainian: Василь Дем'янович Вирозуб; born 25 May 1970, Borshchiv, Ternopil Oblast) is a Ukrainian priest and chaplain.

== Biography ==
His father was a church elder, as well as the founder and builder of two other churches in the Borshchiv Raion of Ternopil Oblast; his grandfather accompanied him on the harmonium (an analog of an organ) during Sunday services in the village church. His paternal uncles, Petro and Vasyl, painted in churches and temples. His uncle and godfather, Vasyl Havrylovych Vyrozub, was a Metropolitan Archpriest of the Ukrainian Church.

Vyrozub studied at the Borshchiv Music School. He graduated from the Ternopil Music College, where he learned to play the clarinet.

After serving in the army, he studied at the theological seminary. He is currently the rector of the Holy Trinity Church of the OCU in Odesa.

He was an active participant in the Revolution of Dignity. He was among the first priests to participate in the creation of a chaplaincy service in the Ukrainian army. In 2015, he went to the east of Ukraine and served as a chaplain in one of the units of the 72nd Mechanized Brigade. He was with the military in the places of combat missions in the Mariupol direction.

On 25 February 2022, as part of the civilian search and rescue vessel Sapfir, chaplains Vasyl Vyrozub, Oleksandr Chokov, Leonid Bolharov, and pediatrician Ivan Tarasenko went to the Horde-held Zmiinyi Island, to pick up the bodies of the allegedly dead Ukrainian defenders, but the Russians took them prisoner and soon sent them first to Sevastopol, then to a filtration camp in the Belgorod region, and from there to the Stary Oskol detention center No. 2. Subsequently, Chokov, Bolharov, and Tarasenko were released after 43 days of imprisonment, interrogation, and abuse, while Vasyl Vyrozub was left in a torture chamber where he continued to be interrogated and subjected to severe torture. On 6 May 2022 he was released during a prisoner exchange. He underwent treatment and rehabilitation in a hospital.

== Awards ==
- Order of Merit, 3rd class (23 August 2022)
- Ceny Paměti národa (17 November 2023, Prague, Czech Republic)
