= The School (TV series) =

2018 Ukrainian TV series

#School (Ukrainian: Школа, romanized: Shkola) is a Ukrainian teen drama television series that aired on 1+1 on 15 January 2018. Directed by Iryna Lytvynenko, Serhii Tolkushkin and Serhii Umanets, it centers on typical teen life in one of the contemporary schools in Ukraine and troubles they confront.

From 15 January 2018, the first season was broadcast on 1+1, where it became the highest-rated series in Ukrainian TV in the autumn 2017 – winter 2018 television season. The final third season "The School. Graduation" was broadcast in March from 4 to 14, 2019. According to the official series Instagram page, the third season was the last one.

In Mass Media, the TV series is known as the first Ukrainian teen drama.

== Plot ==
=== 1 season ===
A couple of young teachers by an accident get a job in one of the Ukrainian schools. Successful businesswoman Kateryna becomes an economics teacher to get along with her daughter. She gets acquainted with a new English teacher, Alex. Soon this job changes their lives because they've never experienced it before. The school challenges them. In school they act like they act in everyday life, and an incorrectly written lesson plan or a school journal attendance log not filled in on time can be the reason for dismissal.

Much attention is paid to the actual problems which schoolchildren have to deal with: bullying, misunderstanding in the family, bribes, and cabals in the teaching staff and among the schoolchildren.

=== 2 season (Non-children games) ===
The characters come to the 11th grade. As they grow up their troubles become more complicated too. Lola found a new admirer who is much older than she is. Nika's past haunts her, and she feels unsafe. Kateryna has to leave the principal chair, and the condition of Ihor Serhiiovych is very unsatisfying.

=== 3 season (Graduation) ===
The third season, The School. Graduation, tells about the main character's lives after the fatal fire and reveals the actual issue for teenagers — choosing the future profession and entering university. Our characters also pass all the trials of the graduating class, but along with it, they will continue the fight for love and popularity among peers. The fire becomes a starting point in the lives of the audience's favorites, because the characters will change their outlooks on life. For example, Lola and Nika, having been rivals, become best friends. It'll also be clear whether it's possible to rescue pregnant Daryna Petrivna, who went to the epicenter of the fire to find Toha, and whom Kateryna Anatoliivna will choose.

== Cast and characters ==
=== Adults ===
Yanina Andreieva as Kateryna Anatoliivna Bilozerska – Veronika Tykhonova's mother, a former businesswoman, an economics teacher and a class leader of 11-A. In the first season Kateryna was appointed as an acting principal. Since the second season she has been a headteacher and at the end of the third season becomes the actual principal. Kateryna also married Alex in the third season.

Mykyta Vakuliuk as Oleksandr (Alex) Ihorovych Biliaev – an English teacher and a son of the school principal— Biliaev Ihor Serhiiovych. Before teaching, he worked as a lawyer in the USA but came back due to the troubles with visa. Alex is married to Mary, who bore him a child in the second season. He has a crush on Kateryna, whom he marries after Mary's death.

Olena Kurta as Daryna Petrivna Kyselova – a math teacher, headteacher at first and then a principal. The ex-wife of the Ukrainian language and literature teacher. She's a lover of Petro Sydorenko (Toha's father) and is expecting a child from him.

Roman Lukianov as Kyrylo Yevhenovych Skoropadskyi – Veronika's father, Kateryna's ex-lover and the head of the educational institutions inspection.

Anatolii Tykhomyrov as Ihor Serhiiovych Biliaev – Alex's father, a former principal, has a heart condition, so wants to retire.

Viacheslav Bohushevskyi as Maksym (Maks) Viktorovych Harmash – a successful surgeon, Dania's father, was dating Lola for some time, then Kate.

=== Schoolchildren ===
Iryna Kudashova as Veronika (Nika) Tykhonova – a 15-year-old daughter of Kateryna and Kyrylo, attempted suicide, and after this changed school, Pasha's ex-girlfriend and present Dania's girlfriend.

Danylo Cherkas as Danylo (Dania) Harmash – Maksym Harmash's son, Nika's ex-boyfriend from the previous school. He's a new schoolboy and starts dating Lola but in the third season again dates Nika, even though he can't forget Lola.

Yelyzaveta Vasylenko as Lolita (Lola) Havrylenko – an internet-blogger, the most popular girl in the school, lives with a grandmother, and two younger brothers, and a younger sister. She dated Toha, Maks, and Dania. Lola loves Dania, but they can't be together due to his father, Maksym Viktorovych, forbidding.

Oleksandr Petrenko as Pavlo (Pasha) Samoilov – Nika's and Lola's ex-boyfriend, but later they are good friends. He's a schoolboy and a sportsman.

Bohdan Osadchuk as Anton (Toha) Sydorenko – a popular schoolboy, learns in the 11-B, a son of the policeman and a young English teacher. He fell in love with Lola but in the second season is dating Sonia. In the third season they break up but at the end make up. After the fire, he was unable to walk due to the broken spine but, eventually, got back on his feet after the surgery.

Oleh Vyhovskyi as Nazar Shcherban – a popular schoolboy, a son of the businessman, dated Nata, Tania (after his exposure he broke up with them) and Asia (is expecting a child from her).

Anna Trincher as Nataliia (Nata) Zaseieva – Lola's friend, a popular schoolgirl, dated Nazar. Since the second season she's started dating Vania, but in the third season they break up due to the distance.

Karyna Chernyavska as Anastasiia (Asia) Kyrylenko – Lola's friend, has affluent parents. She dated Nazar and presently is pregnant with his child.

Veronika Lukianenko as Yeva Anistratenko – Lola's cousin, fancies Pasha.

Maria Kondratenko – plays Sofya (Sonya) Mishchenko, who is an internet blogger, a popular girl at school, and Lola's competitor. She is dating Tokha, an A grade student.

== Production ==
=== Name ===
The TV series has two names: #School (Ukrainian: «ХештегШкола», «HashtagShkola») and The School. Both names are correct. The second season is named '#School. Non-children games' (Ukrainian: #Школа. Недитячі ігри, «HashtagShkola. Nedytiachi igry»), the third one — "#School. Graduation" (Ukrainian: «#Школа. Випускний», «HashtagShkola. Vypusknyi»).

=== Format ===
The TV series initially was supposed to be a scripted reality for day slot. However, there occurred troubles regarding permission from parents to reproduce the stories and the need to redub dialogues in Ukrainian in post-production. Therefore, it was decided to create the whole TV series for the evening slot instead of the day reality. One of the «leftovers» from the scripted reality was the actors were wearing their own clothes instead of studio suits in the first season.

=== Idea ===
According to the creative producer Kseniia Chorna, the script was based on the real stories of Ukrainian alumni, told by their parents.

The series deals with issues relevant to Ukrainian education: bullying of schoolchildren, "Blue Whale Challenge", drug addiction, bullying of teachers, relationships between children and parents in dysfunctional families, pedophilia, early pregnancy, sexual scandals regarding schools, etc.

=== Location and chronology ===
The city where the school is located and the main events take place is not named, but from the dialogues you can understand that it is not Kyiv, since the main characters mention it as a point which is about two-three hours to go to.

Chronologically, the events of the series started in 2017.

=== Shooting ===
Shooting of the first season was run in one of the Ukrainian schools from July to September 2017. The process proceeded quickly, since the deadlines were strict. Overall thirty episodes were shot for the first season.

In February the producer of the series announced the TV series was renewed for a second season. The premiere was planned on 27 August 2018. On 12 June 2018, the shooting of the second season started in one of the Kyiv schools.

Any details concerning the filming of the third season as locations or the precise data of starting the shooting 1+1 didn't disclose.

=== Music ===
The soundtrack of the series was a song by Ukrainian band "Antytila" — «Where we are» (Ukrainian: «Там, де ми є», «Tam, de my ye») (TDME). It was presented on 26 December 2017, on 'Breakfast with 1+1'. The series' soundtrack is also a ringtone of one of the main characters (Andrii), which can be noticed in the 7th episode of the first season. Besides, a song «Between the Worlds» (Ukrainian: «Між Світами», «Mizh Svitamy») by another Ukrainian band «Cloudless» was included in the soundtrack of the series. Also, a son by Ukrainian band «Violet» (Ukrainian: «Фіолет», «Fiolet») — «Silence» (Ukrainian: «Тиша», «Tysha»)

=== Ads ===
Since the second season there's advertising, in particular in the second season there are such brands as ASKfm mobile apps and Viber, Lamel cosmetics, Flint snacks, Eldorado electronics store, KITE backpacks, Fanta drinks, etc.

=== Broadcasting with the Ukrainian-language original ===
The first season was broadcast on "1+1" channel from 15 January 2018 to 15 February 2018. The second season, namely «The School. Non-children games» was broadcast on «1+1» channel from 27 August 2018, to Oktober 11, 2018. TV premiere of the third season, namely «The School. Graduation», started on 4 March 2019, and ended on 14 March 2019.

From 1 March 2019 viewers were able to purchase early access to the third season in the 1+1 video mobile app, which gave an opportunity to watch episodes a day earlier than on TV.

== Ranking ==
The first season became the highest-rated TV series on Ukrainian TV in the autumn 2017 – winter 2018 TV season among viewers aged 18–54. On average, one episode of the series was watched by approximately 2 million viewers, and in just the first two days of the TV broadcasting 10 million people watched the series.

In 2018 the first episode of the first season also was the most viewed video on YouTube in Ukraine among non-musical videos

== Other media ==
=== Book based on the series ===
On 15 September 2018 the presentation of the prequel book Lola's Diary to the TV series by #knygolav publisher and writer Olga Kupriian took place. The plot of the book covers the events that take place in the life of the popular schoolgirl Lola before the first season.
