= Ostap Nyzhankivsky =

Ukrainian conductor and politician (1863–1919)

- отець Остап Нижанківський
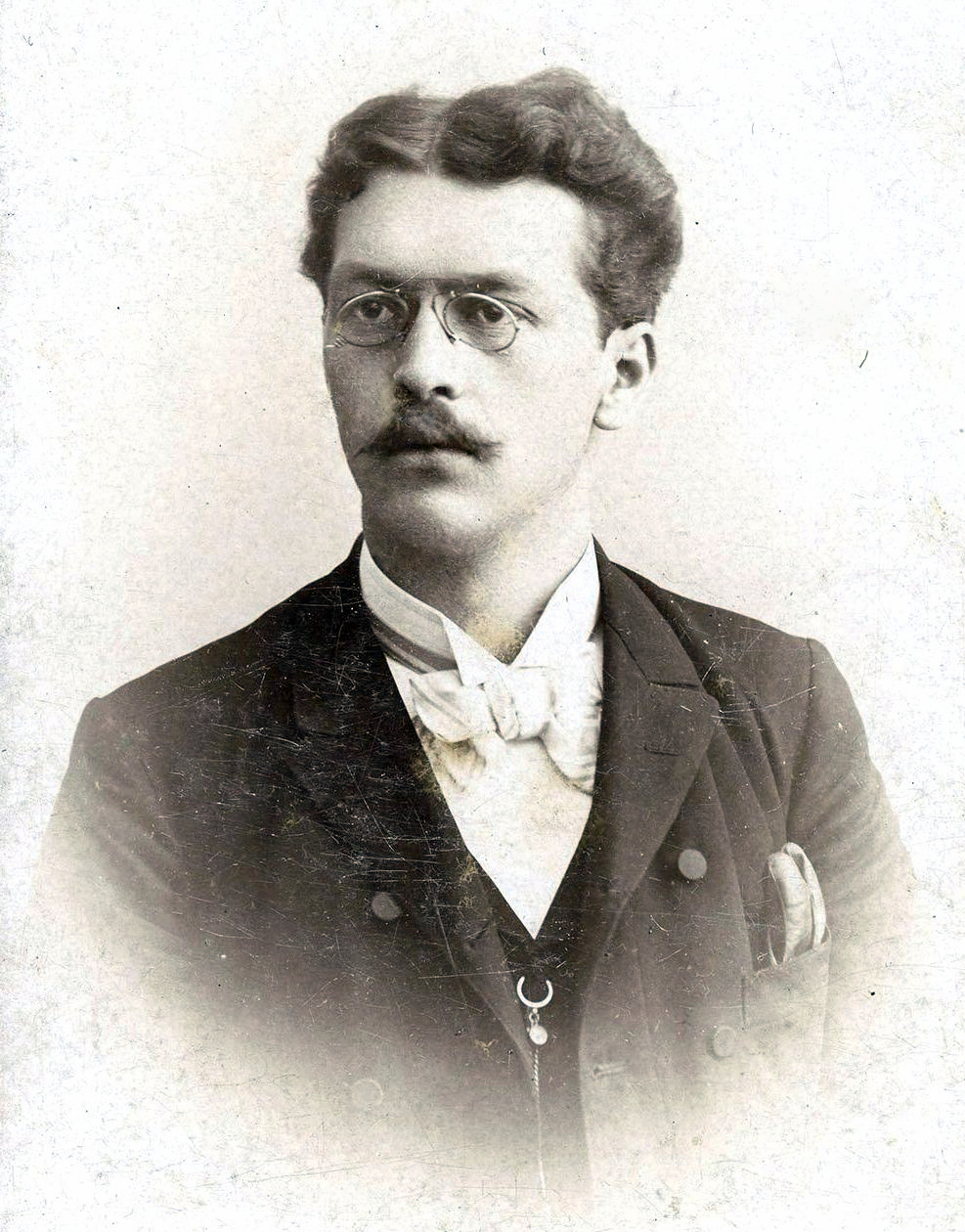

Personal life
- Born: 24 January 1863 Mali Didushychi, Austrian Galicia (now Stryi district of Lviv region)
- Died: 22 May 1919 (aged 56) Stryi, West Ukrainian People's Republic
- Resting place: Stryi city cemetery

Religious life
- Religion: Catholic Church
- Institute: Greek Catholic Theological Seminary in Lviv.
- School: Primary school in the village Duliby and later – of Drohobych gymnasium.

Ostap Yosypovych Nyzhankivsky (Ukrainian: Остап Йосипович Нижанківський and отець Остап Нижанківський; 24 January 1863 – 22 May 1919) was a Ukrainian writer and cleric, a priest of the Ukrainian Greek Catholic Church, composer, conductor, and public figure.

== Life ==
Ostap Nyzhankivsky was born in the village of Mali Didushychi (today Stryi district of Lviv region) on 24 January 1863. He came from a large family of Greek Catholic priest of Joseph Nyzhankivsky (1836–1911), who headed the Greek Catholic parish in the village Mali Didushychi. Later the family moved to the village of Zavadiv. Ostap studied in the nearby village of Duliby and later in Drohobych and Lviv gymnasiums. Nyzhankivsky was expelled from the sixth grade of the gymnasium and had to enter military service in the Austrian army in Lviv (1882–1885). He participated in the "Academic Fraternity", where he met Ivan Franko and composer, conductor and public figure Anatole Vakhnianyn. Nyzhankivsky graduated from Lviv gymnasium in 1888. Later he studied and finished the Greek Catholic Theological Seminary in Lviv (1888–1892). Before his ordination in 1892 Nyzhankivsky married Olena Bachynska, the daughter of Galician composer Hilary Bachynsky. He received his first parish in Berezhany. In 1900 – the family moved to Stryi where Ostap served in the parish of Duliby and later in the village of Zavadiv. In 1907 Nyzhankivskyi founded the first cooperative dairy (in Zavadiv) and the Provincial Home and Dairy Union in Stryi (later renamed Maslosojuz Provincial Dairy Union). On 21 May 1919, during the Polish–Ukrainian War, Nyzhankivskyi was arrested by Polish authorities and shot without trial on the outskirts of Stryi the next day. After his execution, Poles came to the house of Nyzhankivsky in the village of Zavadiv and took all the cattle, poultry and grains. Polish soldiers also took off the shoes of the murdered priest, his gold wedding ring and the watch.

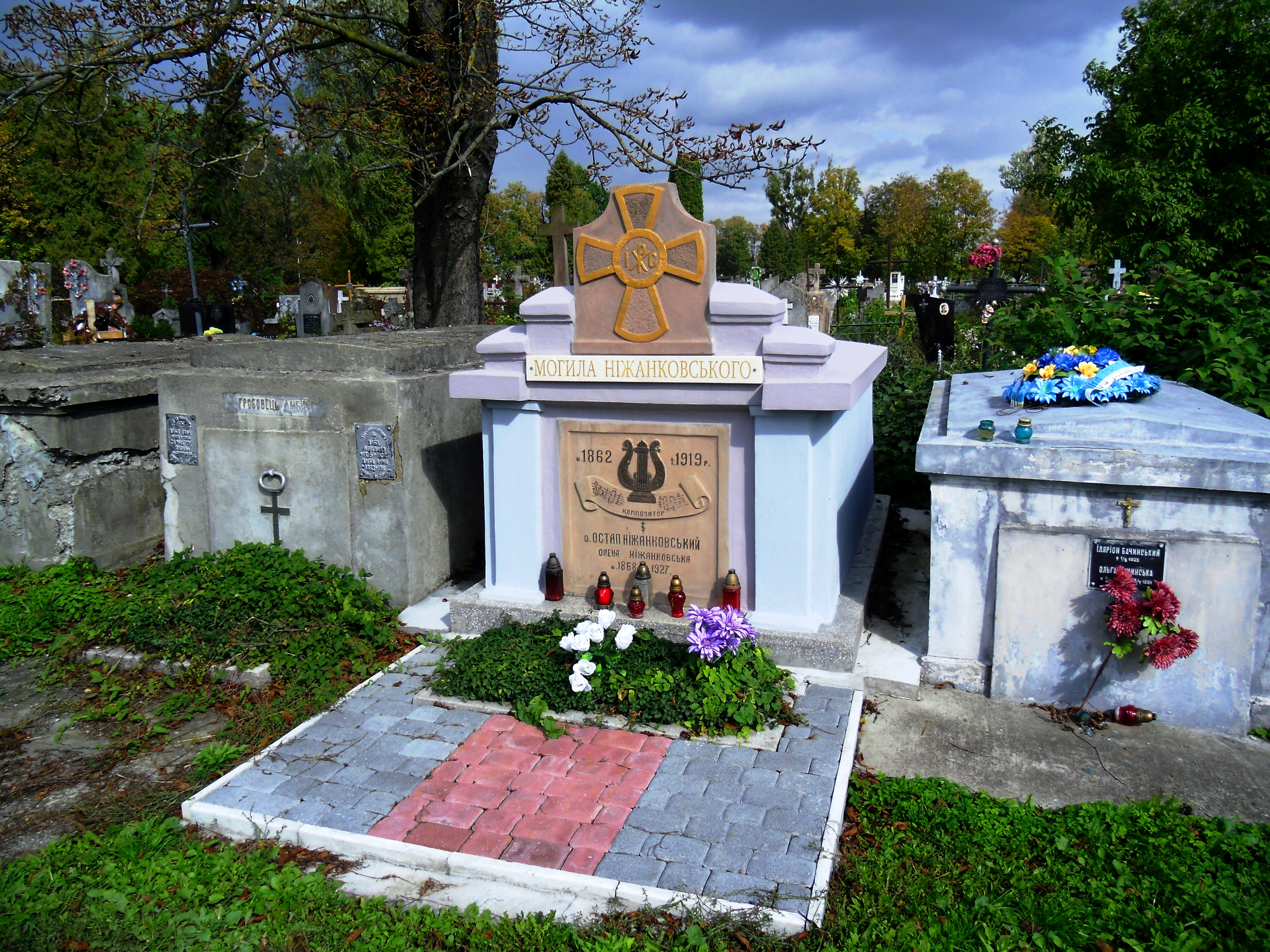
Nyzhankivsky family tomb. Stryi.

Ostap Nyzhankivskyi was buried at the cemetery in the city Stryi in the family tomb together with his wife Olena Nyzhankivska (née Bachynska).

== Composer and musical activities ==
Notes for God is Born

Ostap Nyzhankivsky graduated with honors from the Prague Conservatory in 1896.

He dedicated much of his energy to the development of musical life in Galicia. He founded the music publishing house Muzykalna Biblioteka (1885) and compiled the Ukraïns’ko-rus’kyi spivanyk (Українсько-руський співаник Ukrainian-Ruthenian Songbook, 1907). Ostap helped popularise the piano in Western Ukraine, particularly as a solo instrument, but also as an accompaniment to Ukrainian songs.

His choir compositions ‘Hulialy’ (Гуляли, They Danced) and ‘Z Okrushkiv’ (З окрушків, From Crumbs, text by Yuriy Fedkovych) became very popular. He also wrote solo art songs with piano accompaniment, including ‘Mynuly lita molodii’ (Минули літа молодії, The Years of Youth Have Passed By); arrangements of folk songs for solo voice or choir; and Vitrohony, a cycle of kolomyika melodies for piano.

Ostap Nyzhankivskyi wrote the carols "God Is Born" (Boh sya rozhdaye, Бог ся рождає), "Heaven and earth" (Nebo i zemlya, Небо і земля), "News in Bethlehem" (Vo Vyfleyemi nyni novyna, Во Вифлеємі нині новина) and others...

== Political activism ==
Ostap Nyzhankivsky was elected to the Galician Diet in 1908–13. He was also an elected member of the Ukrainian National Council and district commissioner of the West Ukrainian People's Republic.

When the football team Sich was created in Stryi in 1911, Nyzhankivskyi became its president.
