= Kidanch =

Rural locality in Ivano-Frankivsk Oblast, Ukraine

Kidanch Кіданч
- Location in Ivano-Frankivsk Oblast
- Coordinates: 48°32′17″N 24°58′09″E
- Country: Ukraine
- Oblast: Ivano-Frankivsk Oblast
- Raion: Kolomyia Raion
- Hromada: Pechenizhyn settlement hromada
- Time zone: UTC+2 (EET)
  - Summer (DST): UTC+3 (EEST)
- Postal code: 78270

Kidanch (Ukrainian: Кіданч) is a village in the Pechenizhyn settlement hromada of the Kolomyia Raion of Ivano-Frankivsk Oblast in Ukraine.

== History ==
The first written mention of the village was in 1444.

On 19 July 2020, as a result of the administrative-territorial reform and liquidation of the Kolomyia Raion, the village became part of the Kolomyia Raion.

== Religion ==
- Saints Kosma and Demian church (1852, wooden)

== Notable residents ==
- Mykhailo Dorundiak (1857–1907), Ukrainian lawyer, public and cultural figure, and Doctor of Law.

== Sources ==
- "Kujdańce". Geographical Dictionary of the Kingdom of Poland (in Polish). 4. Warszawa: Kasa im. Józefa Mianowskiego. 1883. p. 852.
