= People's House, Borshchiv =

Building in Ternopil Oblast, Ukraine

People's House
- Народний дім
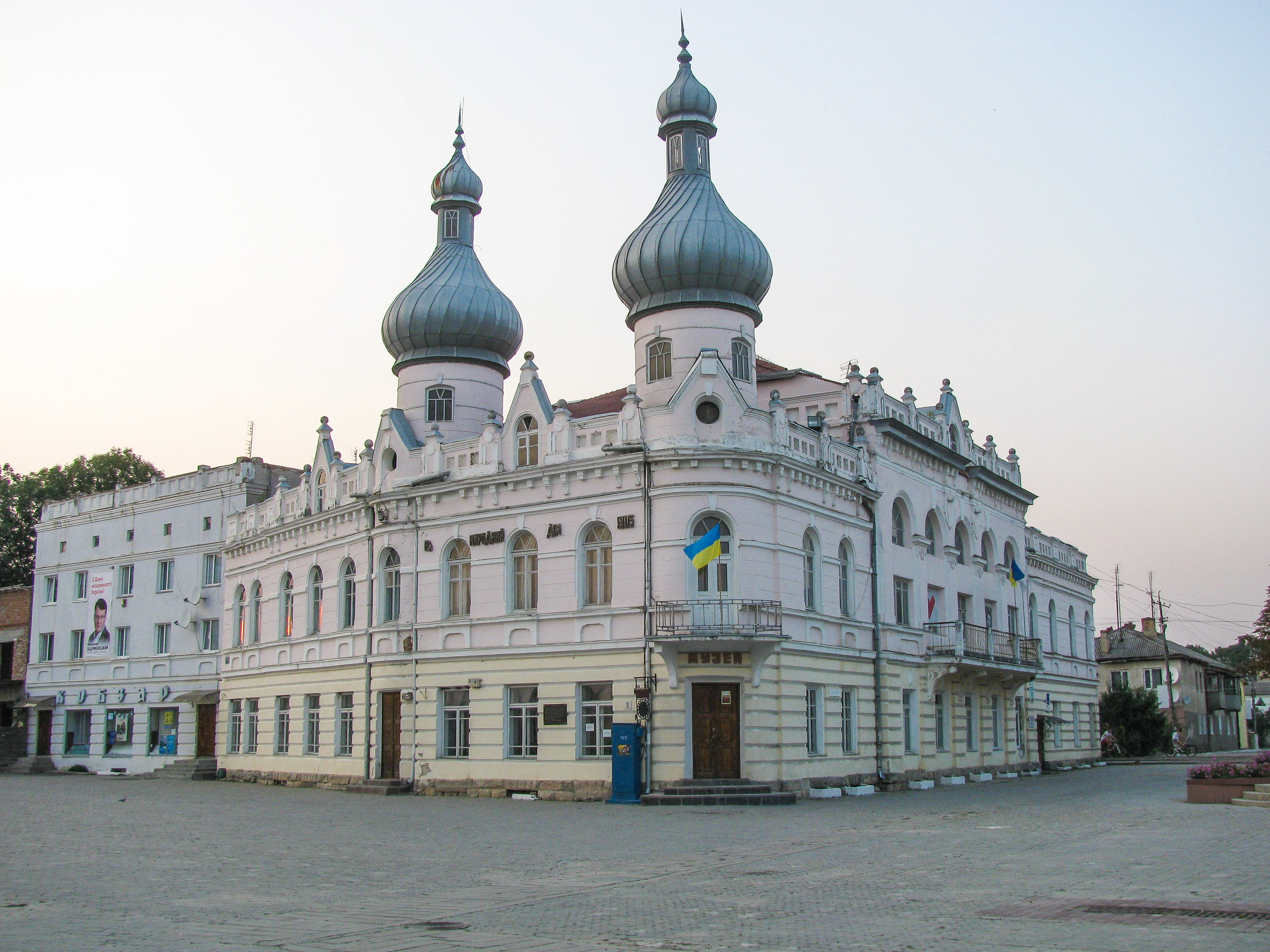
- Interactive map of the People's House area

General information
- Location: Borshchiv, Ternopil Oblast, Ukraine
- Coordinates: 48°48′11″N 26°01′59″E
- Opened: 1909

Design and construction
- Architect: Vasyl Nahirnyi

People's House (Ukrainian: Народний дім) is a cultural institution in Borshchiv, Ternopil Oblast, and an architectural monument of local importance.

== History ==
In 1909, on the initiative of a local lawyer, Mykhailo Dorundiak, the People's House was built (architect Vasyl Nahirnyi). A significant part of the funds for its construction was donated by Mykhailo Hrushevskyi. Financial assistance was also donated by Oleksandr Okunevskyi, Oleksander Kolessa, Mykola Shukhevych, Ivan Horbachevskyi, Ivan Puluj, and others.

The People's House housed the Prosvita association, the Powiat Union Cooperative (uniting 63 people, headed by Stepan Vorkun); the Lviv theater of the Ukrainska Besida association (including Marko Kropyvnytskyi (in 1875), Stepan Yanovych, and Les Kurbas).

From mid-August 1914 to the end of July 1917, Borshchiv was occupied by Russian army troops. At the same time, they confiscated and looted the property of Ukrainian societies and the People's House.

In 1988–1989, the building of the People's House was reconstructed, and now houses the Borshchiv Regional Museum of Local Lore and the Taras Shevchenko Museum.
