= Borshchiv Castle =

Castle in Borshchiv, Ternopil Oblast, Ukraine

- Борщівський замок
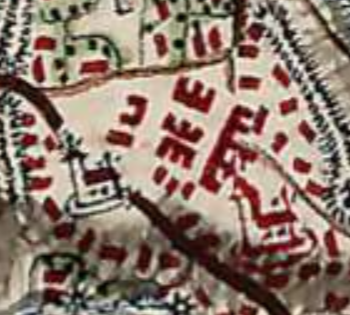
- Borshchiv Castle on the map by Friedrich von Mieg, 18th century

General information
- Location: Borshchiv, Chortkiv Raion, Ternopil Oblast
- Country: Ukraine
- Coordinates: 48°48′05.5″N 26°02′13.0″E

The Borshchiv Castle (Ukrainian: Борщівський замок, romanized: Borshchivs'kyi zamok) is a defensive castle built in Borshchiv, Ternopil Oblast, Ukraine.

== Location ==
The castle area, formerly on the very border with Turkey and Wallachia, was densely planted with small castles, serving the population as protection from sudden attacks by Tatars and Moldavian bandits. The castles were located on rivers with steep banks.

== History ==
The town was first mentioned in 1456, and in 1629 Borshchiv was granted the Magdeburg Law and the Vasa coat of arms – Snopek. The town at that time had ramparts, and there was a brick castle on the river. It can be assumed that the castle was not only the owner's dwelling, but also a bastion that gave shelter to residents when the city fortifications were unable to stop an enemy attack.

== Architecture ==
In the early 18th century, part of the castle was rebuilt into a classical palace on the site where a defensive castle formerly existed. Extensive underground dungeons testified to the size and importance of this ancient stronghold. In 1763, construction of a church began near the palace, which was located within one section of the castle's fortifications. The main facade of the Roman Catholic church was a three-story tower, which was rebuilt from an old castle tower from the 17th century. The walls of the lower tier of the tower were very thick. Today, all that remains of the castle is a fragment of the stone fortifications: the rebuilt defense tower, which became the bell tower of the Roman Catholic church.
