= Duliby, Hrabovets-Duliby rural hromada, Stryi Raion, Lviv Oblast =

Rural locality in Lviv Oblast, Ukraine

Duliby Дуліби
- Village
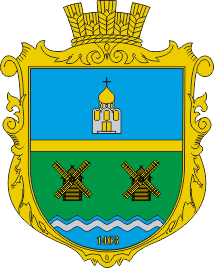
- Coat of arms

- Location within Lviv Oblast
- Coordinates: 49°13′50″N 23°49′00″E
- Country: Ukraine
- Oblast: Lviv Oblast
- District: Stryi Raion
- Established: 1463

Area
  - Total: 252 km^{2} (97 sq mi)
- Elevation /(average value of): 305 m (1,001 ft)

Population
  - Total: ▼3,480
  - Density: 14.567/km^{2} (37.73/sq mi)
- Time zone: UTC+2 (EET)
  - Summer (DST): UTC+3 (EEST)
- Postal code: 82434
- Area code: +380 3245
- Website: село Дуліби ^{(Ukrainian)}

Duliby (Ukrainian: Дулі́би) is a village (selo) located along the Stryi River in Stryi Raion (district) of Lviv Oblast (province) in Western Ukraine. It hosts the administration of Hrabovets-Duliby rural hromada, one of the hromadas of Ukraine. The population of the village is 3 480 people. Local government is administered by Dulibivska village council.

== Geography ==
The village is located in the direction of the Highway M06 (Ukraine) ( M 06) at a distance 3 kilometres (1.9 mi) from Stryi, 75 kilometres (47 mi) from the regional center of Lviv and 192 kilometres (119 mi) from Uzhhorod.

== History ==
The first written mention recorded in court documents is dated 1463.

== Cult constructions and religion ==
Church of St. George 1923 (Wooden) and church of the Transfiguration (stone) is in the village.

== Gallery ==
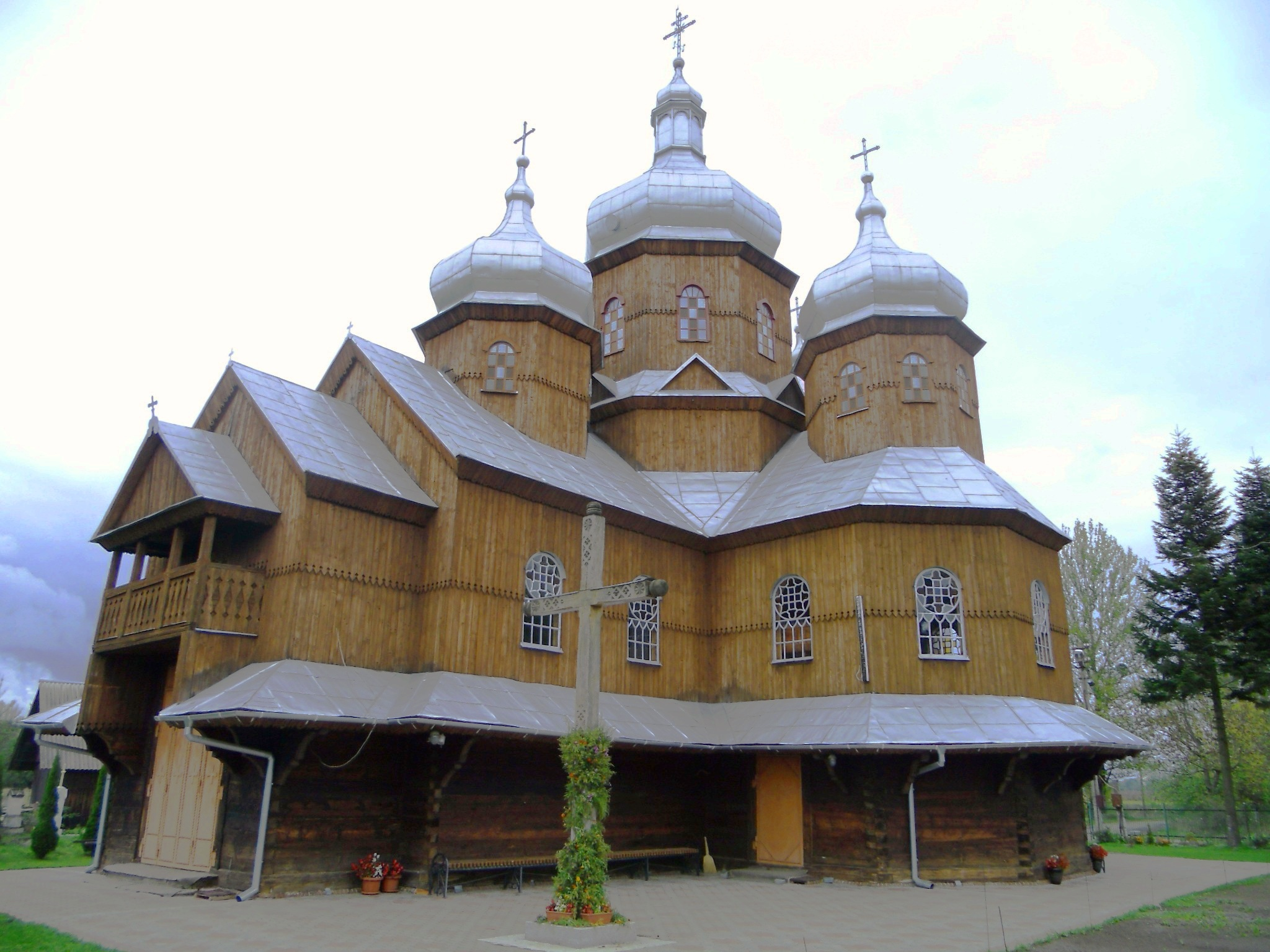
Church of St. George 1923 (wooden).

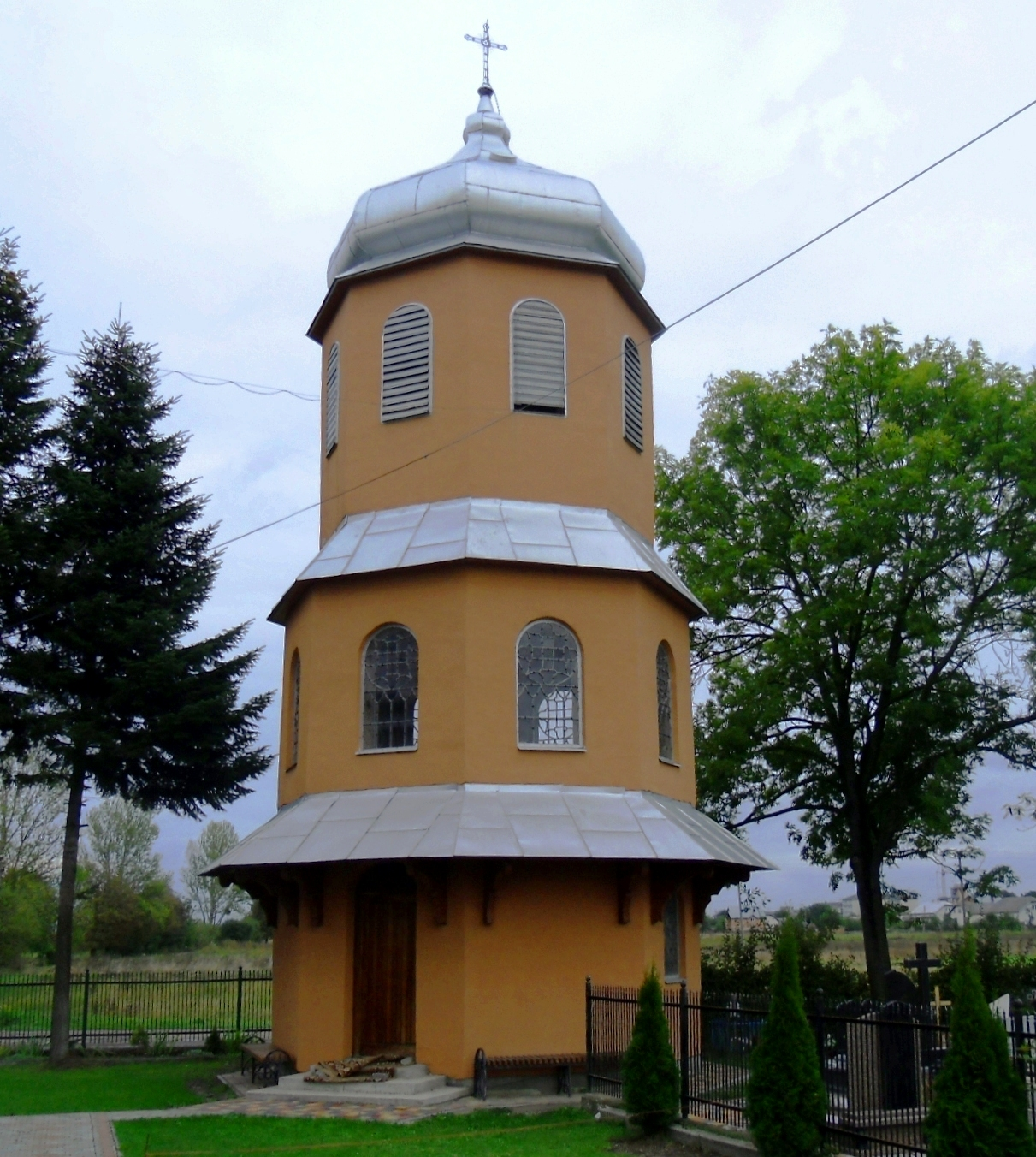
The bell tower of the church of St. George.

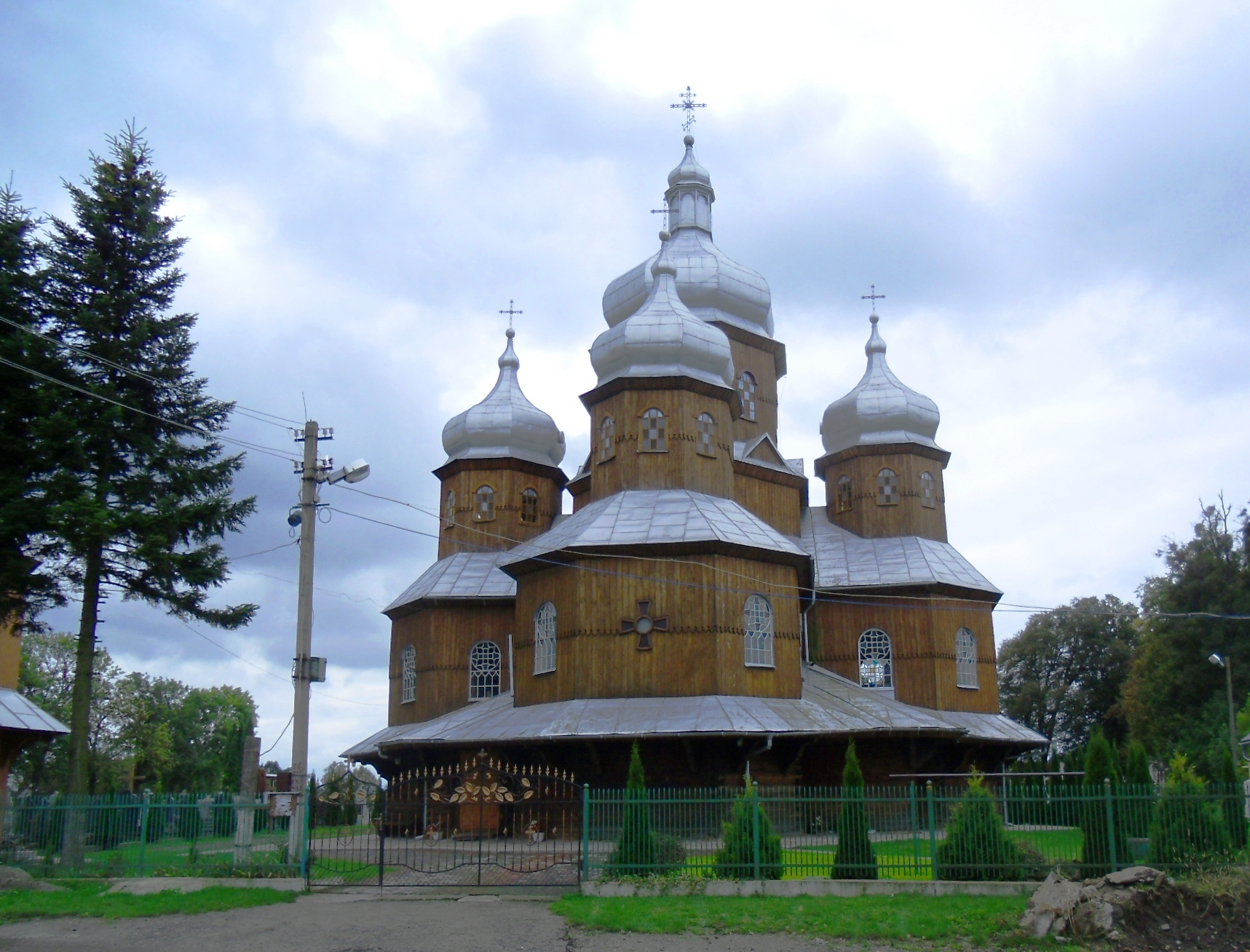
St.George church 1920–1923, Duliby.

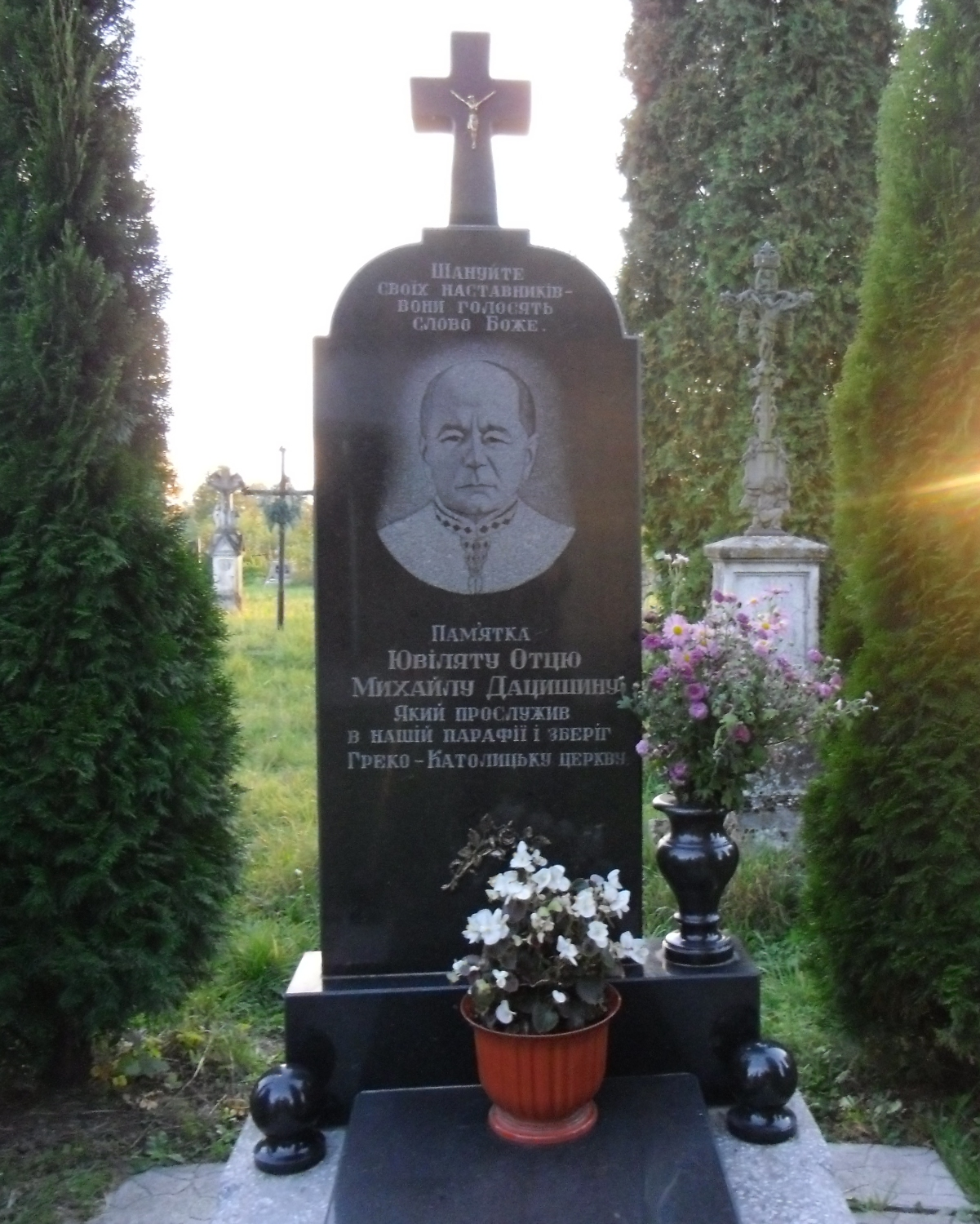
A monument to priest Michael Datsyshyn in the village Duliby.

== Famous people ==
- Ostap Nyzhankivsky (1862 - 1919) – a priest of the UGCC, composer, conductor, and civic leader. Attended elementary school in Duliby. In 1900 he worked as a pastor-administrator and was shot by the Polish authorities in 1919.
- Lev Shankovsky (1903 - 1995) – Ukrainian military historian and former UPA soldier. Born in the village Duliby.
- Michael Datsyshyn (November 20, 1914 - December 14, 1993) – village pastor Ukrainian Greek Catholic Church from 1964 to 1993.

== Literature ==
- Ukrainian: Історія міст і сіл УРСР : Львівська область. – К. : ГРУРЕ, 1968 р., сторінка 833
