= Lev Shankovsky =

Ukrainian rebel soldier and military historian

Lev Shankovsky Лев Шанковський

Personal details
- Born: Lev Shankovsky; 9 September 1903 Duliby, Stryi Raion, Galicia, Austria-Hungary
- Died: 25 April 1995 (aged 91) Philadelphia, Pennsylvania, U.S.
- Occupation: Politician

Military service
- Battles/wars: World War II

Lev Shankovsky (Ukrainian: Шанко́вський Лев Петро́вич, Шанкі́вський), (pseudonym - "Dzvin", "Oleh Martovych") was a Ukrainian military historian and former Ukrainian Insurgent Army (UPA) soldier, a leading member of the Banderite faction of the Organization of Ukrainian Nationalists. He was a full member of the Shevchenko Scientific Society.

Shankovsky was born in 1903 in the village of Duliby, Stryi Raion. He received military education in Ukrainian and Polish schools and served in the armies of the UPR and the UGA. Participants of the First Winter Campaign (1920). During the Second World War, he participated in the Resistance in the Ukrainian Insurgent Army.

In January 1944, Shankovsky, as a leader of the UPA forces, headed the initiating commission that established contacts with representatives of former Ukrainian political parties as well as nonpartisan activists.

Author publications: "Ukrainian Liberation Movement in Modern Times" (1951), "UPA and Its Clandestine Literature" (1952), "The Original Group of OUN" (1958), "Ukrainian Insurgent Army in the struggle for statehood" (1958), "Ukrainian Galician Army" (1974).

Shankovsky died on 25 April 1995, aged 91, in Philadelphia, Pennsylvania, and was interred in the Ukrainian Orthodox Cemetery in South Bound Brook, New Jersey.
