= Borshchiv =

City in Ternopil Oblast, Ukraine

Borshchiv Борщів Borszczów
- City
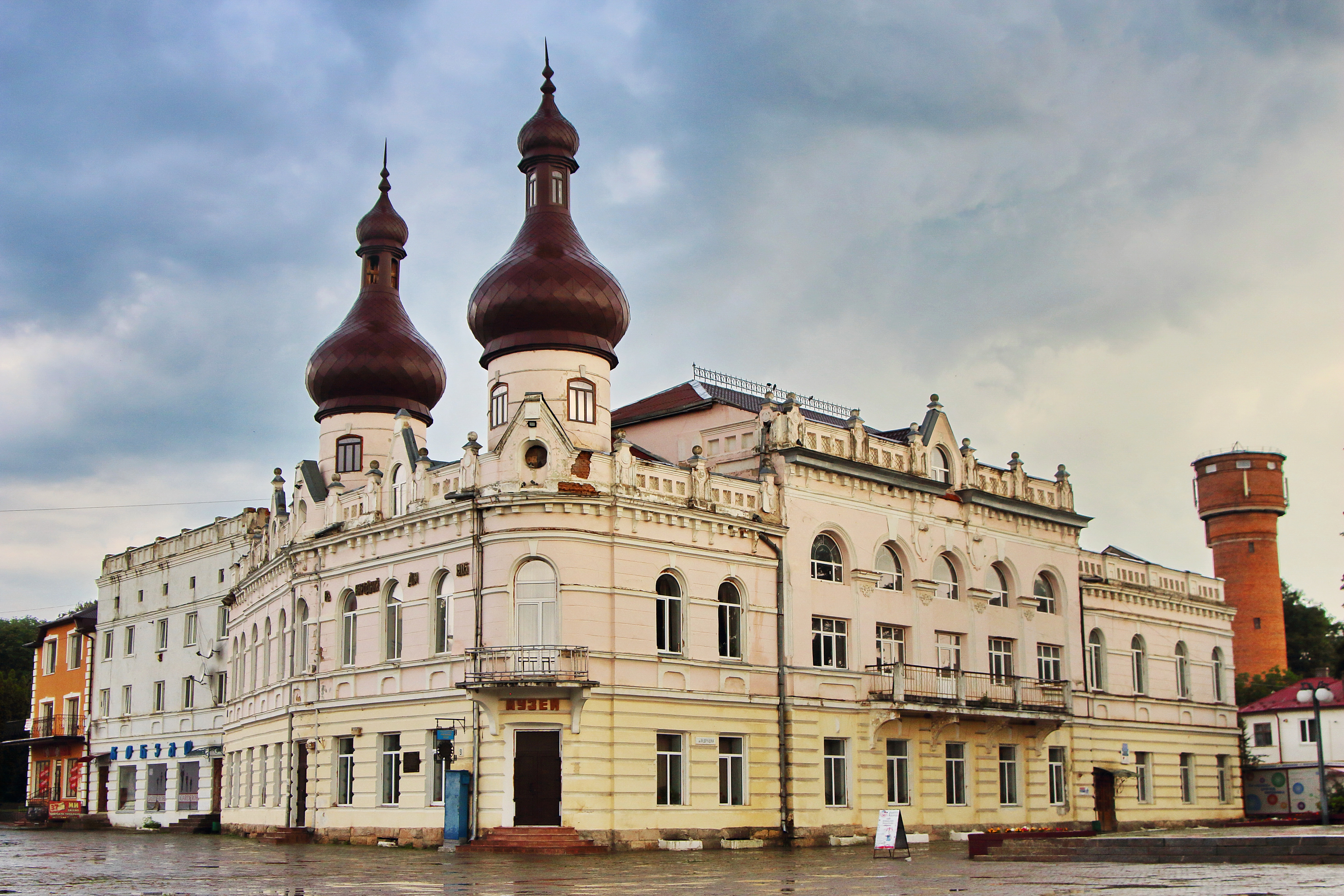
- People's House

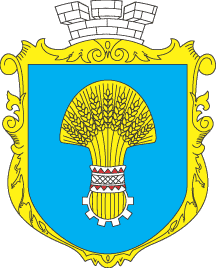
- Coat of arms

- Location of Borshchiv Borshchiv (Ukraine)
- Coordinates: 48°48′10″N 26°2′11″E
- Country: Ukraine
- Oblast: Ternopil Oblast
- Raion: Chortkiv Raion
- Hromada: Borshchiv urban hromada
- First mention: 1456
- Magdeburg Rights: 1629

Population (2022)
  - Total: 10,632
- Time zone: UTC+2 (EET)
  - Summer (DST): UTC+3 (EEST)

The city's pre-war coat of arms

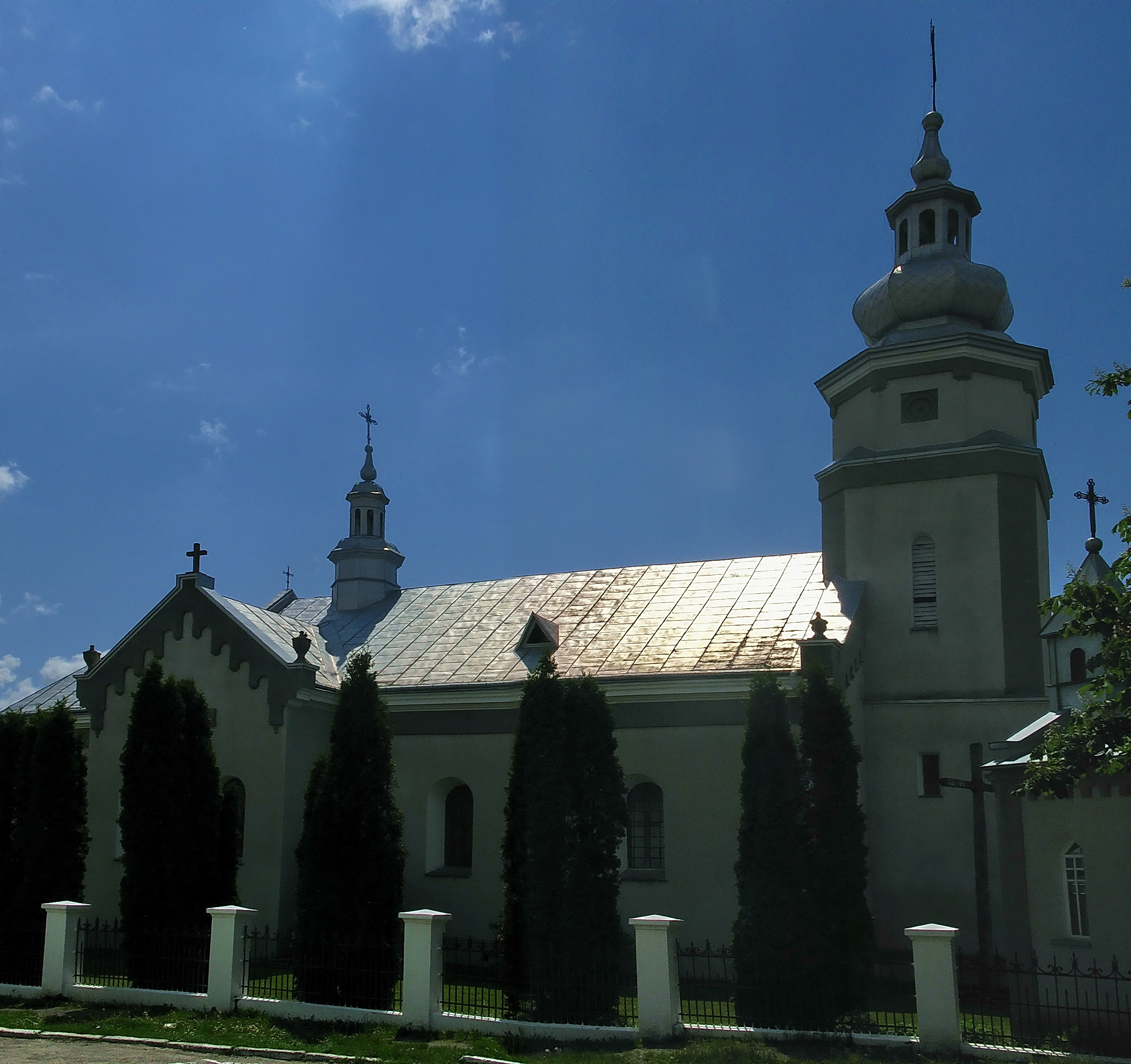
Holy Trinity Church in Borshchiv

Borshchiv (Ukrainian: Борщів, IPA: [borˈʃtʃiu̯]; Polish: Borszczów; Yiddish: בארשטשיוו, romanized: Borshtshev) is a city in Chortkiv Raion, Ternopil Oblast, western Ukraine. It was previously the administrative center of the former Borshchiv Raion until 2020. Borshchiv hosts the administration of Borshchiv urban hromada, one of the hromadas of Ukraine. In 2022, the population was estimated to be 10,632.

== History ==
=== Early history ===
Borshchiv has been mentioned under its name as the Dudinski family manor since 1456. In 1629 the town, which at that time belonged to the Kingdom of Poland, was granted a Magdeburg charter, and the coat of arms, which was the symbol of the House of Vasa - Vase. Between 1672 and 1683, the town was controlled by Ottoman Turks (see Polish–Ottoman War (1672–76)) as part of Podolia Eyalet. It was nominally ruled by Ottomans between 1683 and 1699 and ravaged by Poles and Turks in this period. After the Treaty of Karlowitz, it was returned to Poland. After the First Partition of Poland in 1772, the town was annexed by the Habsburg Empire. From 1809 until 1815, it was controlled by the Russian Empire and then returned to Austrian rule.

=== 20th century ===
Between 1914 and 1917, it was occupied by Russian troops. From 1919 to September 1945, it belonged to Poland, and due to proximity of the Polish-Soviet border, a Border Protection Corps Battalion Borszczów was stationed here. In the Second Polish Republic, Borshchiv was the seat of a county (powiat) in Tarnopol Voivodeship.

During World War II, in September 1939, the town was occupied by the Soviet Union. A local newspaper has been published since October 1939.

It was also occupied by the Axis troops in July 1941 and several mass executions of Jews were carried out in the town. In April 1942, the Borshchiv Jewish ghetto was established. Between the spring and summer of 1943, approximately 400 Jews were sent to the Ivanovka camp and more than 2,300 Jews were shot in the Jewish cemetery.

During World War II, there was no direct attack on the city by UPA terrorists, but 35 civilian residents were killed by Bandera nationalists, mainly while traveling to nearby villages.

After the annexation of eastern Poland on August 16, 1945, the city found itself within the borders of the USSR, and the Polish majority was forcibly relocated to the west.

In 1968 the population was 8,600 people, there was a sugar factory, a dairy plant, a tobacco factory and distillery.

In January 1989, the population was 11,306 people, and there was a sugar factory, a cheese factory, a tobacco factory and distillery.

=== 21st century ===
Until 18 July 2020, Borshchiv served as the administrative center of Borshchiv Raion. The raion was abolished in July 2020 as part of the administrative reform of Ukraine, which reduced the number of raions of Ternopil Oblast to three. The area of Borshchiv Raion was merged into Chortkiv Raion.

== Geography ==
=== Geology ===
The Borshov Horizon or Borshovian Horizon is a geological layer of marl and limestone formed in the lowermost Devonian period. Typical specimens of this province have been recorded in the Upper Dniester valleys near Borshchiv where it reaches the surface layers of the land. It is marked by the presence of microscopic Margachitina chitinozoans, certain trilobites and bryozoa dispersed in grainstone. According to Pushkin, waterborne Bryozoa living in shallow lagoons were the dominant life form that shaped the Borschovian plains. Some areas of the Borschovian layer were dominated by colonies of a single species where others were populated by a mix of different Bryozoa.

=== Climate ===
Climate data for Borshchiv
Month	Jan	Feb	Mar	Apr	May	Jun	Jul	Aug	Sep	Oct	Nov	Dec	Year
Mean daily maximum °C (°F)	−0.7 (30.7)	1.4 (34.5)	7.1 (44.8)	14.6 (58.3)	20.2 (68.4)	23.4 (74.1)	25.2 (77.4)	24.8 (76.6)	19.6 (67.3)	12.9 (55.2)	6.8 (44.2)	1.4 (34.5)	13.1 (55.5)
Daily mean °C (°F)	−3.3 (26.1)	−1.8 (28.8)	2.8 (37.0)	9.8 (49.6)	15.4 (59.7)	18.9 (66.0)	20.8 (69.4)	20.2 (68.4)	15.3 (59.5)	9 (48)	4 (39)	−1.1 (30.0)	9.2 (48.5)
Mean daily minimum °C (°F)	−6.1 (21.0)	−5 (23)	−1.5 (29.3)	4.5 (40.1)	10 (50)	13.9 (57.0)	15.9 (60.6)	15.4 (59.7)	11 (52)	5.4 (41.7)	1.3 (34.3)	−3.6 (25.5)	5.1 (41.2)
Average precipitation mm (inches)	34 (1.3)	38 (1.5)	46 (1.8)	57 (2.2)	71 (2.8)	92 (3.6)	104 (4.1)	70 (2.8)	65 (2.6)	46 (1.8)	42 (1.7)	40 (1.6)	705 (27.8)
Average rainy days (≥ mm)	6	7	8	8	9	9	10	8	7	6	6	7	91
Average relative humidity (%)	83	81	74	66	63	65	67	66	68	76	83	82	73
Mean daily sunshine hours	2.6	3.4	5.9	8.9	10.6	11.1	11.3	10.2	7.8	5.4	3.0	2.8	6.9
Source: Climate Data

== Monuments ==
- Borshchiv Castle

== Notable people ==
- Bolesław Bronisław Duch (1896–1980), Polish Major General
- Artur Dumanyuk (born 1996), Ukrainian professional footballer
- Oleksii Hunovskyi (1882–1961), Ukrainian Greek Catholic priest, composer, public figure, educator, political prisoner, and head of the Chortkiv District National Council of the ZUNR
- Bohdan Sehin (born 1976), Ukrainian composer and organizer of music programs
- Vasyl Vyrozub (born 1970), Ukrainian priest and chaplain
