= Hrabovets-Duliby rural hromada =

Hromada in Lviv Oblast, Ukraine

Hrabovets-Duliby rural hromada Грабовецько-Дулібівська сільська громада
- Hromada
- Interactive map of Hrabovets-Duliby rural hromada
- Country: Ukraine
- Oblast: Lviv Oblast
- Raion: Stryi Raion
- Admin. center: Duliby

Area
  - Total: 1,521 km^{2} (587 sq mi)

Population (2021)
  - Total: 12,201
  - Density: 8.022/km^{2} (20.78/sq mi)
- CATOTTG code: UA46100030000016064
- Settlements: 12
- Villages: 12
- Website: gd-gromada.gov.ua

Hrabovets-Duliby rural hromada (Ukrainian: Грабовецько-Дулібівська сільська громада) is a hromada in Ukraine, in Stryi Raion of Lviv Oblast. The administrative center is the village of Duliby.

== Settlements ==
The hromada consists of 12 villages:

- Verkhnia Stynava
- Volia-Dovholutska
- Hirne
- Hrabovets
- Dovholuka
- Duliby
- Kolodnytsia
- Koniukhiv
- Liubyntsi
- Monastyrets
- Nyzhnia Stynava
- Khromohorb
