= Borshchiv Raion =

Former subdivision of Ternopil Oblast, Ukraine

Borshchiv Raion Борщівський район
- Raion
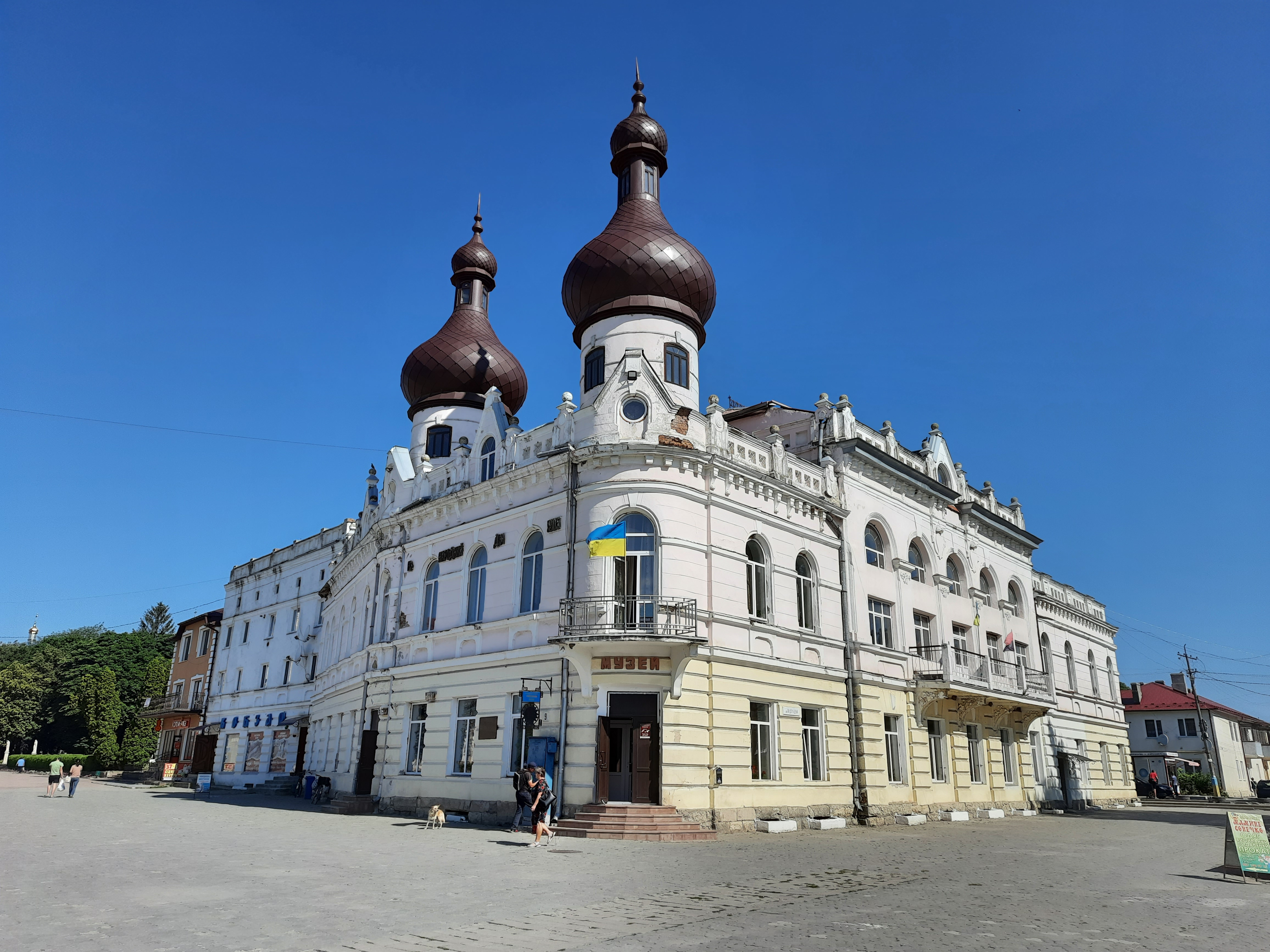
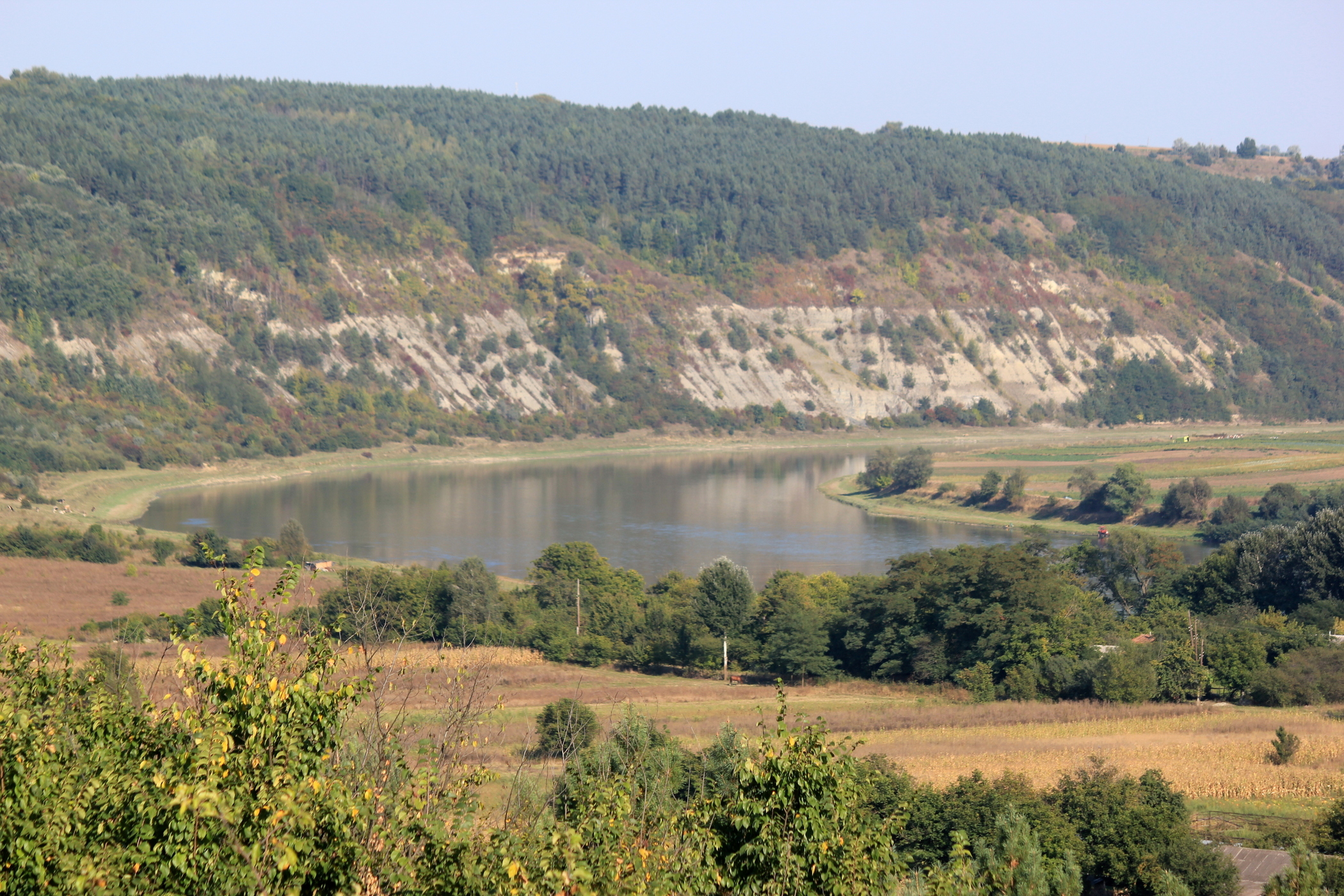
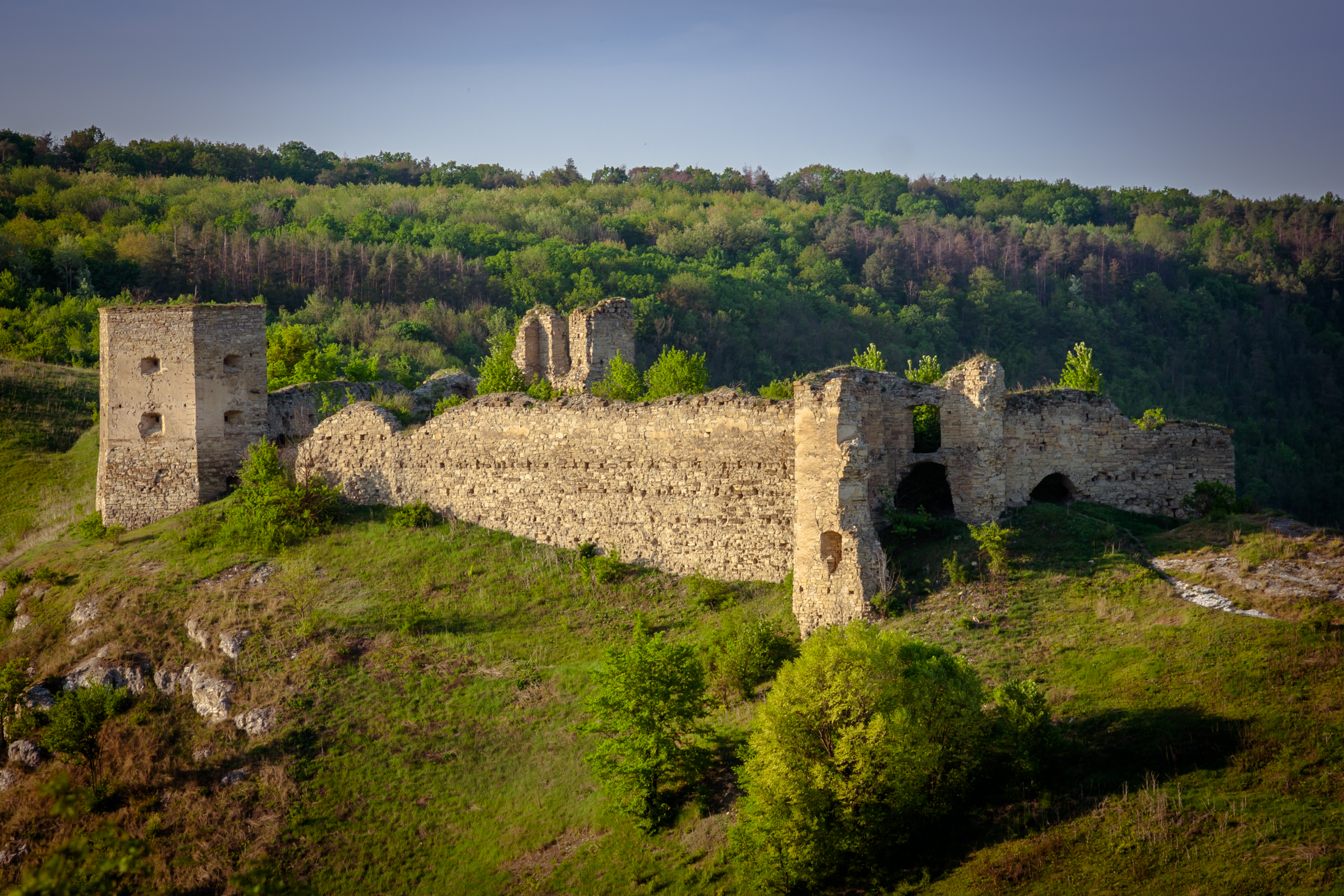
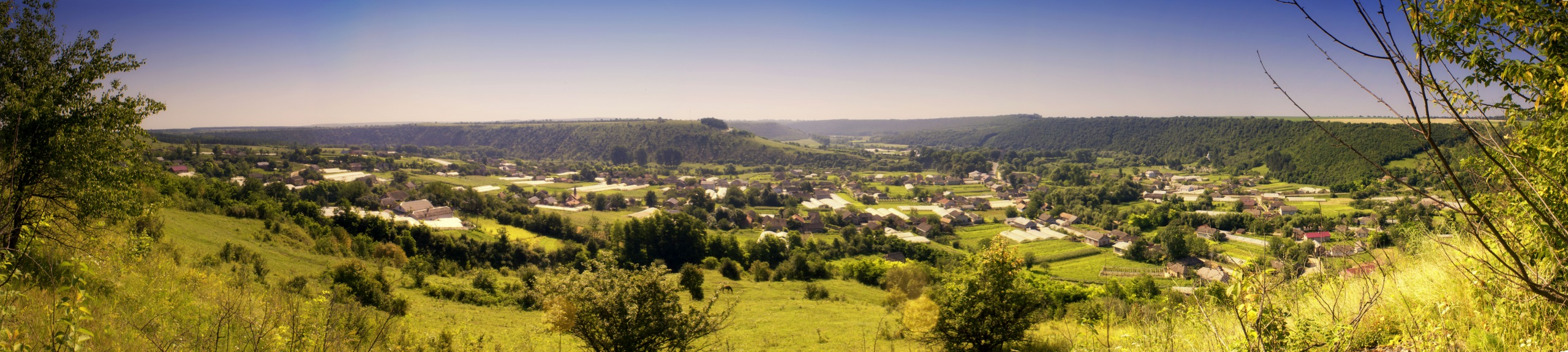
- From top: People's House in Borshchiv, Dniester Canyon, Kudryntsi Castle, Panorama of Kasperivtsi

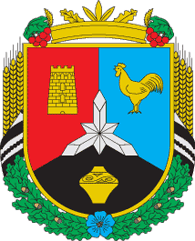
- Flag Coat of arms

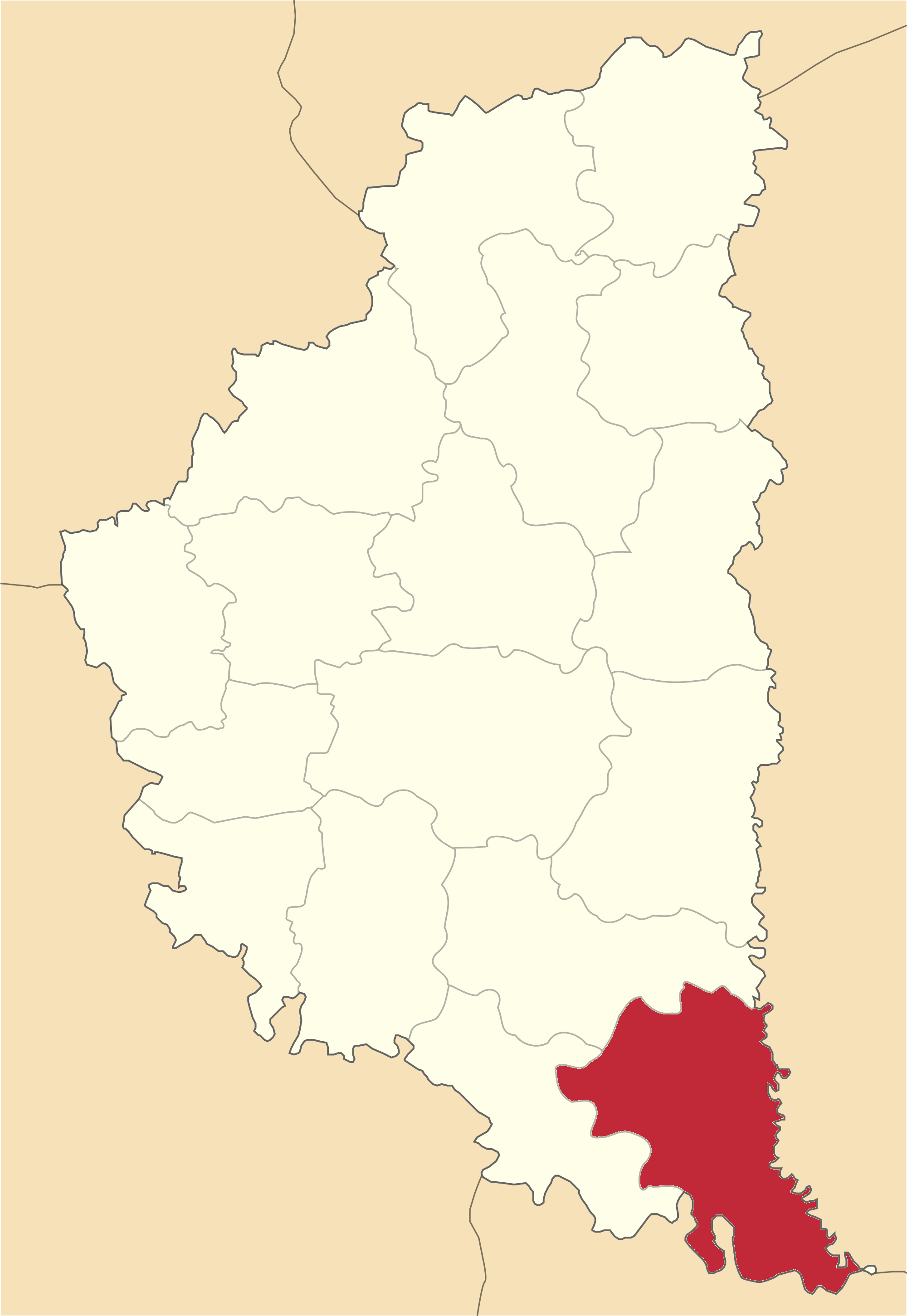
- Coordinates: 48.80483°N 26.04034°E
- Country: Ukraine
- Oblast: Ternopil Oblast
- Disestablished: 18 July 2020
- Admin. center: Borshchiv
- Subdivisions: List: — city councils; — settlement councils; — rural councils; Number of localities: 1 city; 5 urban-type settlements; 70 villages; — rural settlements

Area
  - Total: 1,006 km^{2} (388 sq mi)

Population (2020)
  - Total: 64,966
  - Density: 64.58/km^{2} (167.3/sq mi)
- Time zone: UTC+02:00 (EET)
  - Summer (DST): UTC+03:00 (EEST)
- Postal index: 487
- Area code: 380
- Website: Verkhovna Rada website

Borshchiv Raion (Ukrainian: Борщівський район, romanized: Borshchivskyi raion), historically known as Powiat Borszczów, was a raion (district) within Ternopil Oblast in western Ukraine, in a historical region known as Galicia and bordering Podollia. The administrative center of the raion was Borshchiv, its only city. The district encompassed Borshchiv, two towns, five hromadas and 70 villages. Mainly agricultural, its warmer climate supported a variety of crops including wheat, sugar beets, tobacco, barley, and hemp.

The district's human history dates back to the Palaeolithic and Neolithic periods and several archaeological sites have been dated back to the earliest human occupation of Ukraine, as well as to later Bronze Age occupations. During the Middle Ages, modern-day Borshchiv Raion fell under Kievan Rus' and then Polish-Lithuanian Commonwealth rule.

The raion was merged into Chortkiv Raion on 18 July 2020 as part of the administrative reform of Ukraine. The last estimate of the raion population was 64,966 (2020 est.).

== History ==
=== Prehistory and antiquity ===
Some of the earliest traces of human occupation in Ukraine have been found in Borshchiv Raion and broader Podollia, and several archaeological sites dating back to the Palaeolithic and Neolithic periods are located inside the district. At Verteba Cave near Bilche-Zolote, traces of the Trypillian culture (dated to c. 5000-3000 BCE) include pottery and ceramics, tools and human and animal bones scattered around a hearth. Nearby, traces of an associated Neolithic village, called Naddnistriansky Pompei ("Pompeii on the Dniester River") by archaeologists, have been located. Early settlements were aided by the region's rivers, which provided ample opportunity for fishing; early humans here hunted and fished before later engaging in agriculture.

Local Bronze Age artifact assemblages and sites in Borshchiv Raion, including amphorae, pottery and stone cist gravesites, are associated with Thracian and Scythian occupation. Later cultures, including the Romans, Celts, Antes, Huns and Goths, also left traces in the surrounding area.

=== Polish–Lithuanian Commonwealth ===
Following the 1240 Siege of Kiev, Borshchiv was included within the Kingdom of Galicia–Volhynia. After the fall of that kingdom in the mid-14th century, Borshchiv Raion was controlled by Lithuania, then Poland, and finally by the Polish–Lithuanian Commonwealth. This period of rule brought an influx of Polish nobles, who established serfdoms under which the indigenous Ukrainian inhabitants worked on nobility-owned farms. As part of Poland, the district was called Bezirk Borszczów and belonged to the Podolia Voivodeship.

Beginning in the 15th century, Galicia as a whole began experiencing raids from the Ottoman Empire and the Tatars, being on the border of these civilizations. These raids devastated the region, destroying entire villages, and either killing or enslaving the inhabitants. Following the Khmelnytsky Uprising, the part of Ukraine containing Borshchiv Raion was transferred to Ottoman rule between 1672 and 1699.

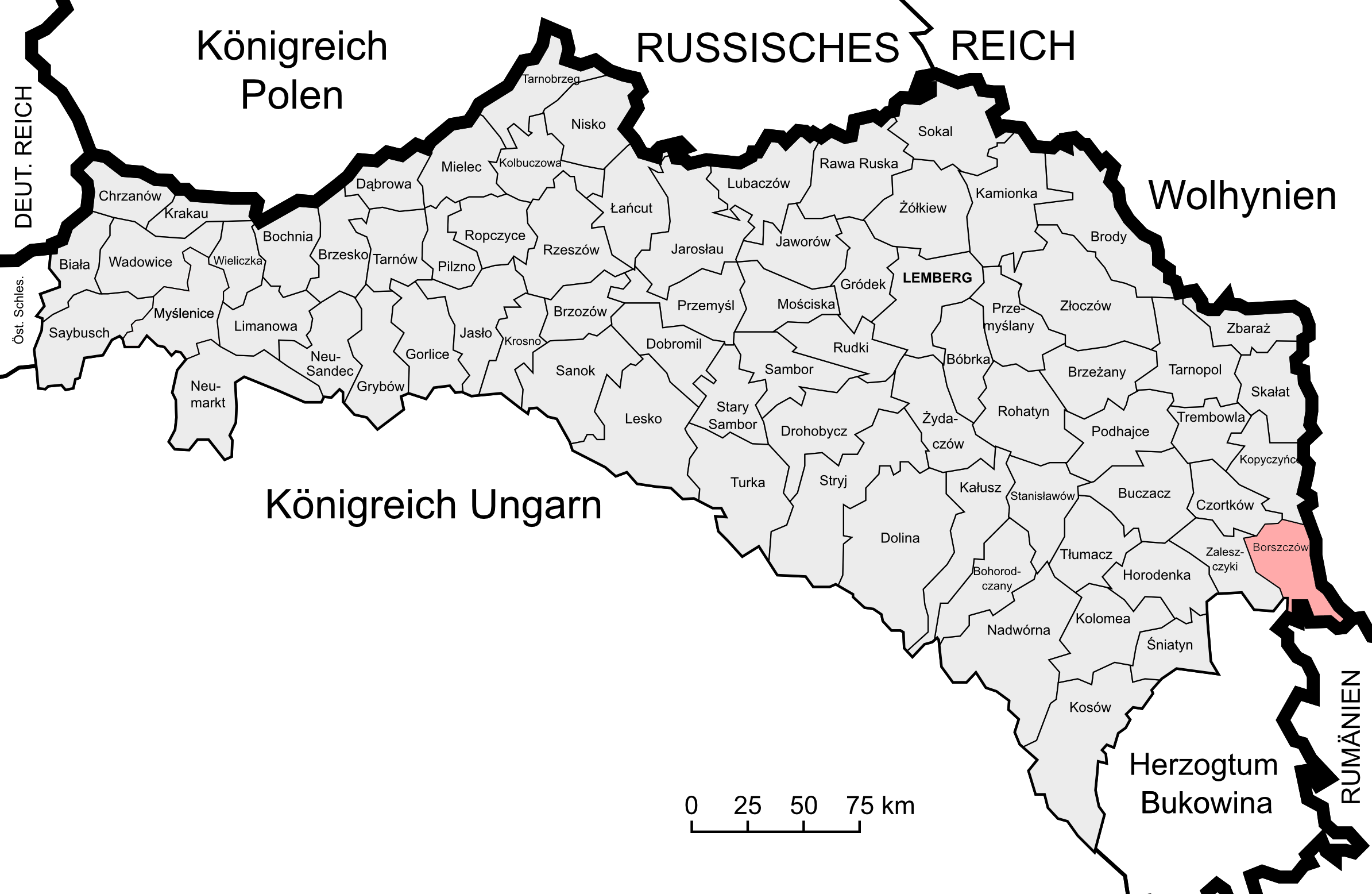
Location of Bezirk Borszczów (Borshchiv Raion) in the Austrian Kingdom of Galicia and Lodomeria

Poland later regained control of this lost territory, but by the late 18th century, the commonwealth was beginning to decline. During the Partitions of Poland, Borshchiv Raion was included in a transfer to the Austrian Empire. Serfdom was abolished in 1848.

=== 20th century–present ===
After the end of the Austro-Hungarian Empire following World War I, Borshchiv Raion again became part of Poland, which reinstated tenant farming. A second wave of Polish immigration followed, mainly of Masurians. Simultaneously, a wave of mass emigration was occurring, heralded by extreme levels of poverty and oppressive government policies. In 1940, the Masurians in Borshchiv Raion were deported by Bolsheviks under order from Joseph Stalin. The district then came under Soviet rule until the fall of the Soviet Union, when Ukraine gained independence.

Dozens of Jews survived the Holocaust by hiding in Priest's Grotto, a natural cave near Strilkivtsi.

On 18 July 2020, Borshchiv Raion was merged into Chortkiv Raion as part of the administrative reform of Ukraine, which reduced the number of raions of Ternopil Oblast to three.

== Geography ==
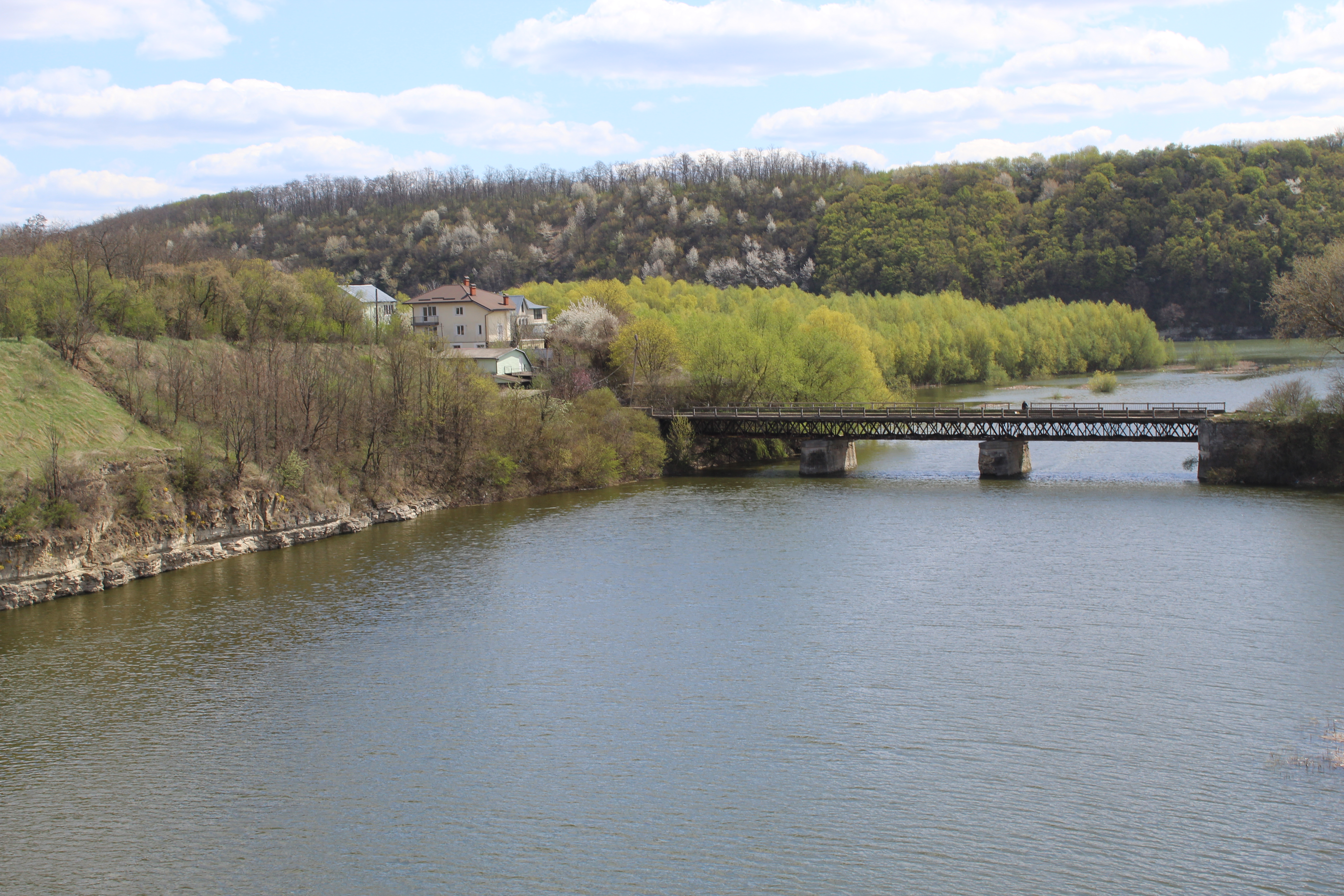
Silurian deposits visible on the Dniester River at Okopy

Borshchiv Raion was a roughly wedge-shaped district in southern Ternopil Oblast, western Ukraine, at the convergence of the Galicia, Podollia and Bukovina regions. It was bounded on the east by Husiatyn Raion, Chortkiv Raion to the north, Zalishchyky Raion to the west, and Chernivtsi Oblast to the south. Its southern boundary follows the Dniester River and the eastern follows the Zbruch River, which converge in the southeastern corner of the raion near Okopy.

The territory of Borshchiv raion was 1,006 square kilometres (388 sq mi).

Borshchiv Raion sits atop the Podolian Upland, a high plateau pushed up from the ancient Sarmatian Sea by pressure exerted from the shifting Carpathian Mountains, generating abundant deposits of gypsum and limestone. An ice sheet covered the area until the Last Glacial Maximum. When this melted, rivers and streams carved out valleys, ravines and subterranean caverns. This topography has also created many mineral springs. The local climate tends to be warmer than many areas of Ukraine, and hard frosts are rare. Although some natural forests exist, the landscape is dominated by farmland, orchards, and ranches.

== Demographics ==
In 2020, the district's population was 64,966 (2020 est.); of this, 19,621 were urban inhabitants (mostly concentrated in Borshchiv).

In 1931, 15,559 urban residents were recorded, and an additional 87,588 inhabitants in other villages and rural areas. Of these residents, 50.9% were of Ukrainian descent, 44.7% Polish, and about 4.5% Jewish. In 1989, the population was estimated to be about 80,000.

== Economy ==
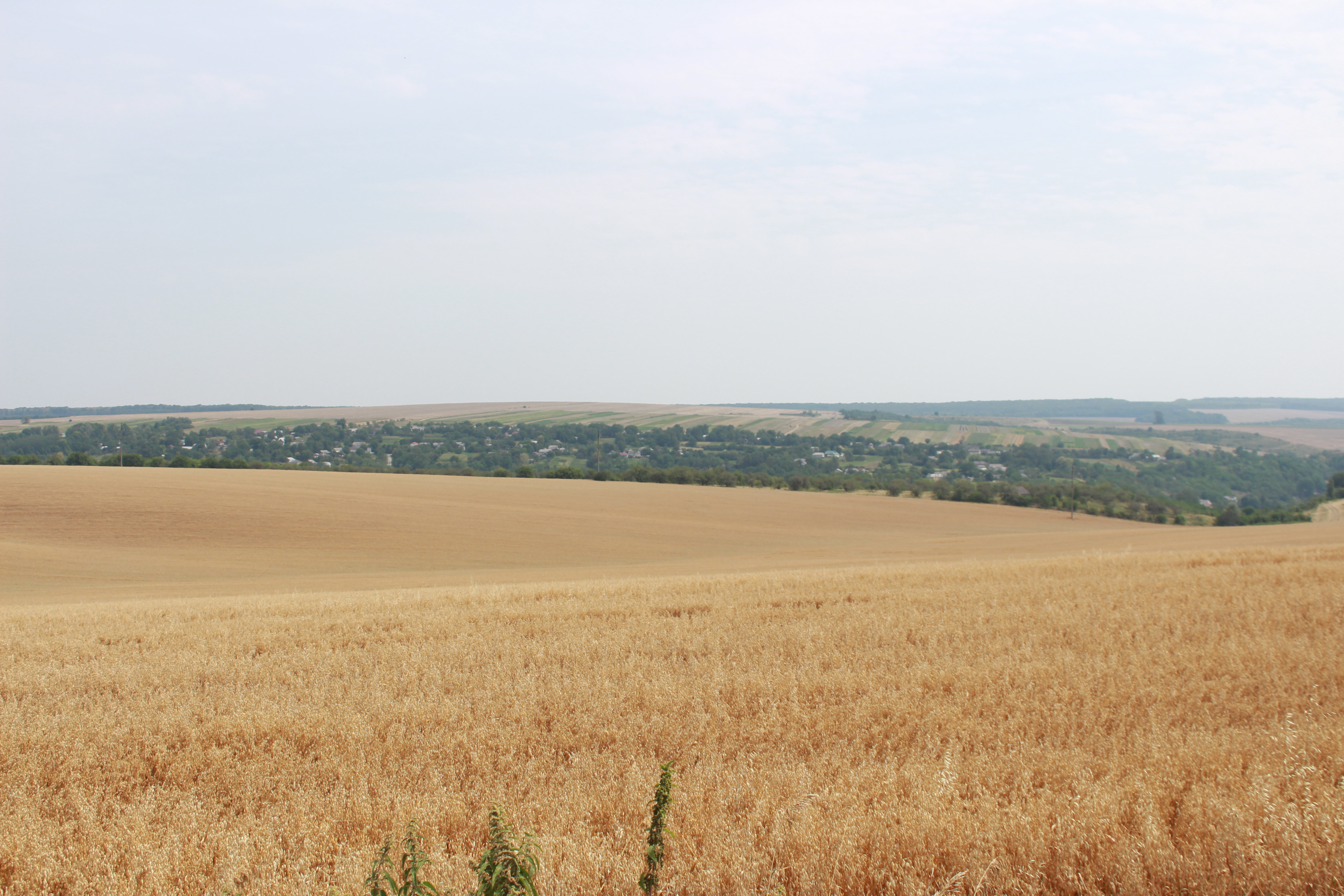
Farmland near Sapohiv

The land comprising Borshchiv Raion remains mostly agricultural. Supported by abundant rainfall and milder winters than most of Ukraine, the main crops included sugar beets, sunflowers, wheat, barley, tobacco, potatoes, corn and hemp; orchards of fruit and nuts; and honey from apiaries. Livestock farming was also popular and included chickens, geese, cows, and pigs. Historically, sheep were also reared in the district. Besides agriculture, skilled crafts also contributed to its economy and culture and included blacksmithing, weaving and embroidery, cobbling, and masonry. These industries were often season-dependent, being practiced more out of harvest.

== Culture ==
Borshchiv Raion—and the area of Chortkiv Raion comprising it today—culturally resembled Podollia. As a rural, agricultural district, its festivals and customs heavily relied on the seasons and harvest schedule.

=== Clothing ===
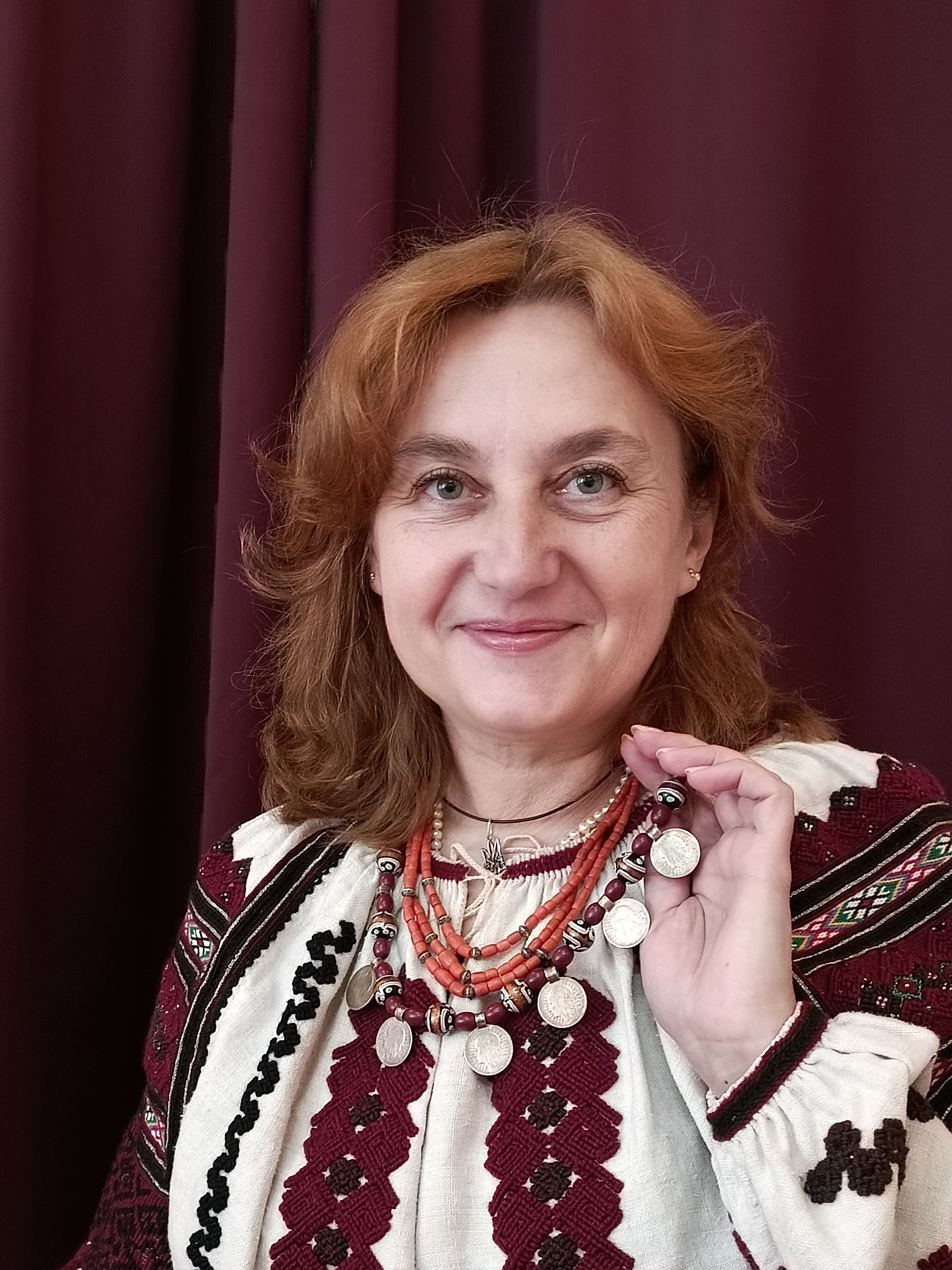
Victoria Kryvonis in a traditional vyshyvanka from Borshchiv Raion

Traditional clothing in the district depended on use and ceremony. The prevalence of manual labor called for simpler, lightly ornamented clothing for everyday wear. However, heavily embroidered vyshyvanky were used for important events, such as church attendance, festivals, holidays and celebrations. Vyshyvanky or sorochky, the Ukrainian folk shirt, is defined by its ornamentation; for men, embroidery is relegated to the collar and cuffs, but on women's sorochky, decoration extends to the sleeves and is more lavish. Styles can often be traced to one region and may vary between villages. Most sorochky were made of hemp, but the richest residents could afford to have them made from linen. Women's sorochky for festivals contained shoulder inserts that prevented them from waving their arms.

Borshchiv Raion is distinct in its use of heavy embroidery made of thick black wool, thicker than the shirt material, giving the piece a raised texture. Plant and simple geometric designs were commonly used. Sometimes, smaller threads in different colors, sequins, beads, and other adornments were included. Funeral shirts in Hermakivka were often embroidered with thread colored yellow by marigolds.

Folklore provides several explanations for the origin of the black embroidery. One theory is that the practice originated after invaders killed almost every man in the local villages, and the women adopted the black threads in mourning. Other legends alternately suggest the practice came to a local woman in a dream to end a drought, or that the black wool was used in hopes it would promote good health and protect wearers from disease.

== Subdivisions ==
=== Hromadas ===
At the time of disestablishment, the raion consisted of five hromadas:

- Bilche-Zolote rural hromada with the administration in the selo of Bilche-Zolote;
- Borshchiv urban hromada with the administration in Borshchiv;
- Ivane-Puste rural hromada with the administration in the selo of Ivane-Puste;
- Melnytsia-Podilska settlement hromada with the administration in the urban-type settlement of Melnytsia-Podilska;
- Skala-Podilska settlement hromada with the administration in the urban-type settlement of Skala-Podilska.

=== Urban-type settlements ===
There were two urban-type settlements in the former Borshchiv Raion, Melnytsia-Podilska and Skala-Podilska.

=== Villages ===
There were over 70 villages (selo) within the raion. Names are given in transliterated Ukrainian followed by the historical Polish names in parentheses.

- Babyntsi (Babińce) is located 18 km (11 mi) south of Borshchiv. The name derives from the Ukrainian word "baba" (grandmother, woman). It was an old Rus fortified settlement with ramparts around it, which are preserved.
- Berezhanka (Bereżanka) is located on a peninsula inside a narrowing of the Zbruch River.
- Bilivtsi (Bielowce) is a small village on the banks of the Dniester River.
- Bilche-Zolote (Bilcze Złote) is a village with a park of 1,800 hectares (4,400 acres), of which 11 hectares (27 acres) are planted with 400-year-old trees. Bilche Zolote is located some 16 km (9.9 mi) west of Borshchiv. The village is known for a significant Neolithic Cucuteni-Trypillian culture archaeological site dating back to the 4th millennium B.C., a small palace, and the large gypsum karst Verteba Cave, which was used in World War II as a hiding place for Ukrainian Jews who fled the Nazis during The Holocaust in Ukraine, a story that was featured in the June/July 2004 issue of the National Geographic Adventure Magazine, as well as numerous other journal articles.
- Boryshkivtsi (Boryszkowce) has archaeological sites dating back to antiquity.
- Burdiakivtsi (Burdiakowce) is 15 km (9.3 mi) northeast of Borshchiv. It is not far from the Zbruch river.
- Dnistrove (Wołkowce nad Dniestrem), located on the Dniester River.
- Dubivka (Dębówka)
- Dzvynyachka (Dźwiniaczka), briefly called Komunarivka between 1964 and 1990.
- Dzvenyhorod (Dźwinogród) has an Assumption Church (Uspenska tserkva) with belfry. It is located on the slope of a mountain next to the Dniester (Dnister) river. The church dates from 1801 but the western part was reconstructed in 1861. The village is located in the southern part of the Borshchiv district, on the bank of the Dniester river (during 1920–1939 when Dzvenyhorod was part of Poland, the river Dniester was the border between Poland and Romania's Bukovina).
- Hermakivka (Germakówka) is a small village, located 20 km (12 mi) southeast of Borshchiv, 5 km (3.1 mi) west of the river Zbruch. The Zbruch was the border between the Austrian and Russian empires during 1772–1918. (Hermakivka was on the Austrian side of the river). What is remarkable about Hermakivka is that there is a Trayan wall (Wal Trajana in Polish and Trajaniv Val in Ukrainian), south of the village. It stretches from Hermakivka south via Zalissia and Kdryntis to the river Dniester. The Trayan wall was built by the Romans (under the emperor Trajan), as the northeastern border of the Roman Empire (province of Dacia).
- Hlybochok (Głęboczek), a predominantly Polish settlement with a history dating back to about the 3rd millennium BCE.
- Holihrady, Goligrady (Holihrady) is located on the left bank of the Seret river, 23 km (14 mi) southwest of Borshchiv. The village has an old stone church and a cave.
- Horodok (Gródek) is on the isthmus of the Seret and Dniester rivers, 33 km (21 mi) southeast of Borshchiv, not far from the town of Zalishchyky. Note that there is major town with the same name in the Lviv region of Western Ukraine. The name literally means "little town". It had an old pre-historical settlement and a burial ground was also discovered here.
- Horoshova (Horoszowa)
- Hrabivtsi (Hrabiwci)
- Hushtyn (Gusztyn)
- Hushtynka (Gusztynek)
- Ivane-Puste (Iwanie Puste) has traces of occupation dating back to 7000–6000 BCE. It has the wooden church of St. John the Evangelist with a belfry. The church dates from 1775 (Polish kingdom times, two years before Ivane-Puste came under Austrian rule) and is a monument to the old Podolian school of people's architecture.
- Ivankiv (Iwanków)
- Kapustyntsi (Kapuścińce) is 22 km (14 mi) northwest of Borshchiv, on the left bank of the river Seret. The name comes from the Slavic root "kapusta" (cabbage). There used to be a Rus settlement here and there was also a medieval town.
- Kasparivtsi (Kasparowce) is located 30 km (19 mi) southwest of Borshchiv, on the river Seret. Many old coins have been found in this village. It has an eighteenth-century stone church.
- Khudiivtsi (Chudyjowce) has traces of occupation dating back to the first century CE.
- Khudykivtsi (Chudykowce) was first mentioned in 1410.
- Konstantsiya (Konstancja)
- Korolivka (Korolówka) is 10 km (6.2 mi) south of Borshchiv. Korolivka boasts a palace and cave.
- Kozachchyna (Kozaczówka)
- Kryvche (Krzywcze) is known mainly because of its cave system, one of the longest in the world. It is also known for Kryvche Castle, which dates from first half of the 17th century and is built of sandstone, representing a typical castle from that period. It is made up of the merging of two separate villages, Verkhne Kryvche (Krzywcze Górne) and Nizhne Kryvche (Krzywcze Dolne).
- Kudryntsi (Kudryńce) also boasts a 17th-century castle. This one is located on the plateau of a steep mountain over the river Zbruch. This river was the border between the Austrian and Russian empires. Kudryntsi was on the right bank of Zbruch, i.e. the Austrian side. The original wójts of this region were of the noble house Kudrycki z Kudrynce h. Labedz i.e. Herb Labedz; from the period predating the Polish Lithuanian Commonwealth, probably of the Grand Duchy of Lithuania. The castle was fortified about 1386 following the Kreva agreement. Legend has it the castle is linked with Kryvche via underground sandstone caves. This castle fortress is also built of sandstone, but it is non-regular in plan and has three corner towers. It was reconstructed in the 18th century. The Trayan Wall passes through Kudryntsi (from Hermakivka via Zalissia and Kudryntsi south to the river Dniester). This wall was built by the Roman emperor Trajan, and served as the north-eastern border of the Roman Empire.
- Kulakivtsi (Kułakowce) is 32 km (20 mi) southwest of Borshchiv, on the isthmus of the rivers Dniester and Seret. The name comes from the Slavic word "kulak" (fist). The village has a 19th-century wooden church.
- Lanivtsi (Łanowce) is 5 km (3.1 mi) northwest of Borshchiv. It has the remains of an old fortified settlement.
- Latkivtsi (Łatkowce)
- Losyach (Łosiacz)
- Mikhalkiv (Michałków)
- Mykhailivka (Michałówka)
- Monastyrok (Monastyrek) was briefly renamed Mizhhirya during Soviet times.
- Mushkariv (Muszkarów)
- Mushkativka (Muszkatówka)
- Nyvra (Niwra)
- Okopy
- Oleksyntsi (Oleksińce)
- Ozeriany (Jezierzany) was once a noble estate. It has the Church of St. Anne. As it grew, it absorbed a smaller community, Jezierzanka.
- Panivtsi (Paniowce)
- Pidpylypya (Podfilipie)
- Pylatkivtsi (Piłatkowce)
- Pylypche (Filipkowce) has some of the oldest traces of local settlements, dating back to 4000–3000 BCE.
- Pyshchatyntsi (Piszczatyńce)
- Sapohiv (Sapohów)
- Shershenivka (Szerszeniowce)
- Shuparka (Szuparka)
- Shyshkivtsi (Szyszkowce)
- Skoviatyn (Skowiatyn)
- Slobidka-Mushkativs'ka (Słobódka Muszkatowiecka)
- Strilkivtsi (Strzałkowce)
- Triitsia (Trójca) has occupying dating back to 2000 BCE.
- Trubchyn (Trubczyn)
- Tsyhany (Cygany), also called Rudka.
- Tulyn (Tulin)
- Turylche (Turylcze) absorbed a smaller village, Słobódka Turylecka.
- Urozhaine (Babince) was known as Babyntsi before 1964 (not to be confused with the other settlement of the same name).
- Ustia (Uście Biskupie)
- Verbivka (Wierzbówka)
- Verkhnyakivtsi (Wierzchniakowce)
- Vilkhovets (Olchowiec)
- Vovkivtsi (Wołkowce koło Borszczowa)
- Vyhoda (Wygoda Boryszkowiecka)
- Vysichka (Wysuczka)
- Yuryampil (Jurjampol)
- Zalissia (Zalesie)
- Zavallya (Zawale)
- Zbruchanske (Zbruczańskie, Czarnokozieniecka or Nowosiółka Biskupia) absorbed the smaller village of Młynówka in the early 20th century.
- Zbryzh (Zbrzyż)
- Zelene (Zelene)
- Zhylyntsi (Zielińce)

== See also ==
- Borshchiv Ghetto
- Subdivisions of Ukraine
