= Nichlava =

River in Ukraine

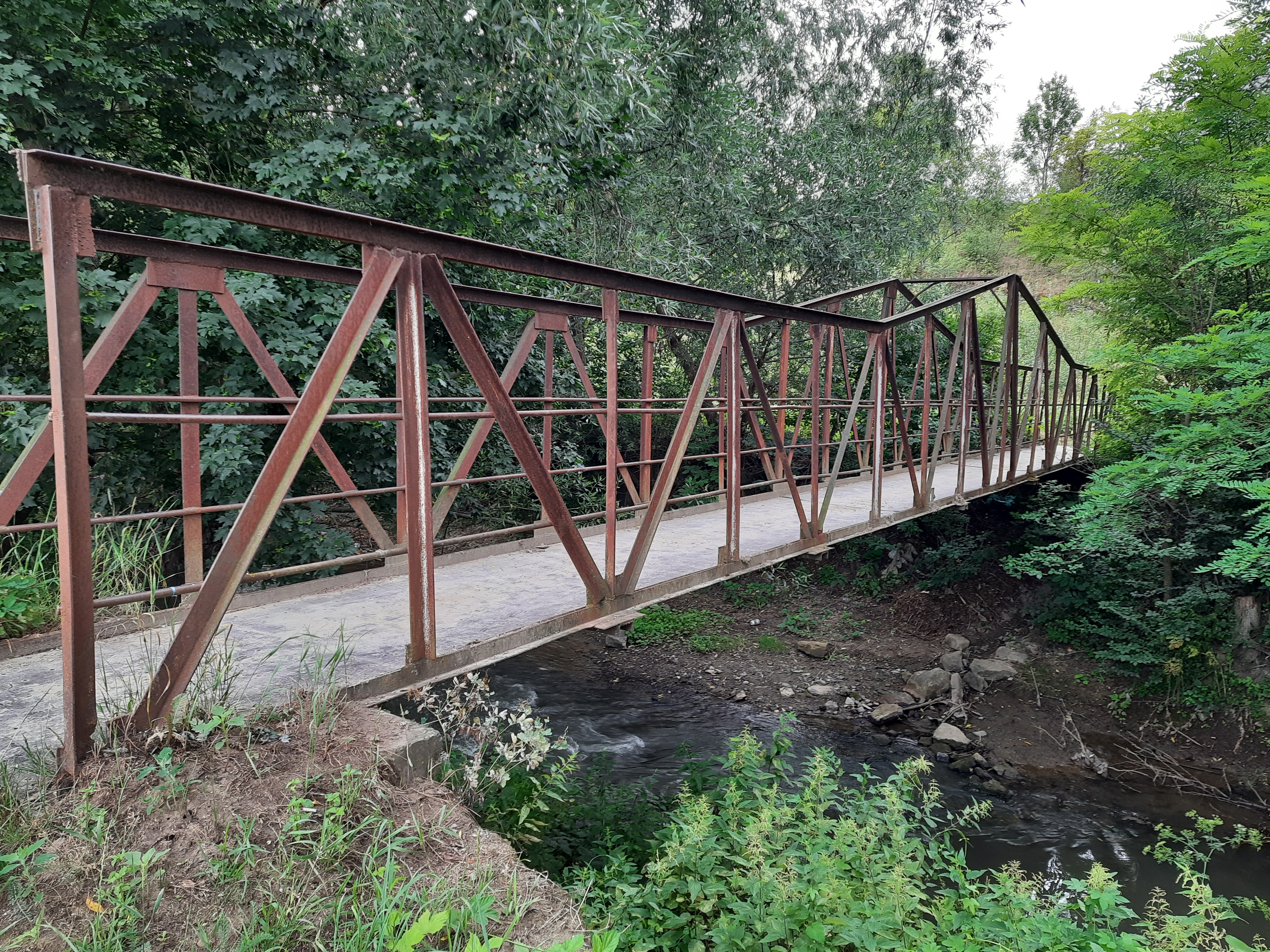
- A bridge over the river at Pylypche
- Native name: Нічлава (Ukrainian)

Location
- Country: Ukraine

Physical characteristics
- Source
  - location: Chahari
  - coordinates: 49°05′52″N 25°59′09″E
- Mouth: Dniester
  - coordinates: 48°36′21″N 26°05′42″E
- Length: 83 km (52 mi)
- Basin size: 871 km^{2} (336 sq mi)

Nichlava (Ukrainian: Нічлава; medieval name - Sarnik) is a river in Ukraine, within the Chortkiv Raion of Ternopil Oblast. Left tributary of the Dniester (Black Sea basin).

== Description and location ==
Length 83 km. The catchment area is 871 km. The slope of the river is 2.1 m / km. River waters are used for technical water supply.

Nichlava originates from the tract "Nichlava", located in the village Krohulets. The origin of the name of the tract is unknown. From the beginning of the source in the village it forms three ponds, and then flows past the village of Chahari. It flows within the Podolsk Upland mainly to the south. It flows into the Dniester near the village of Ustia.

Nichlava has the main right (western) tributary – Nichlava, the source of which is located near the village of Yabluniv. The confluence of the Nichlavka and Nichlava rivers is located between the villages of Kolyndiany and Davydkivtsi. At the confluence of the tributary is flooded than Nichlava.

== Tributaries ==
Right: Nichlavka, Drapaka.

Left: Tsyhanska.

== Settlements ==
Above the river are the following villages, towns, cities (from the source to the mouth): Chahari, Krohulets, Kotsyubyntsi, Zhabyntsi, Probizhna, Velyki Chornokintsi, Davydkivtsi, Tarnavka, Pylatkivtsi, Zhylyntsi, Lanivtsi, Verkhnyakivtsi, Borshchiv, Vysichka, Pyshchatyntsi, Strilkivtsi, Skoviatyn, Shyshkivtsi, Khudiivtsi, Babyntsi, Pylypche, Mykhalkiv, Ustia.

== Sources ==
- Географічна енциклопедія України : [у 3 т.] / редкол.: О. М. Маринич (відповід. ред.) та ін. — К., 1989—1993. — 33 000 екз. — ISBN 5-88500-015-8.
- Нічлава // Словник гідронімів України / Уклад. І. М. Железняк, А. П. Корепанова, Л. Т. Масенко [та ін.]; Редкол. : К. К. Цілуйко (голова) та ін. — К. : Наукова думка, 1979. — С. 390.
- Каталог річок України. — К. : Видавництво АН УРСР, 1957.
- Свинко Й. Нічлава // Тернопільський енциклопедичний словник : у 4 т. / редкол.: Г. Яворський та ін. — Тернопіль : Видавничо-поліграфічний комбінат «Збруч», 2005. — Т. 2 : К — О. — 706 с. — ISBN 966-528-199-2.
- "Niczława, al. Niecława, Nikława". Geographical Dictionary of the Kingdom of Poland (in Polish). 7. Warszawa: Kasa im. Józefa Mianowskiego. 1886. p. 34.

— S. 34—35. (in Polish)
