= Borshchiv Ghetto =

Ghetto in Nazi-occupied Ukraine

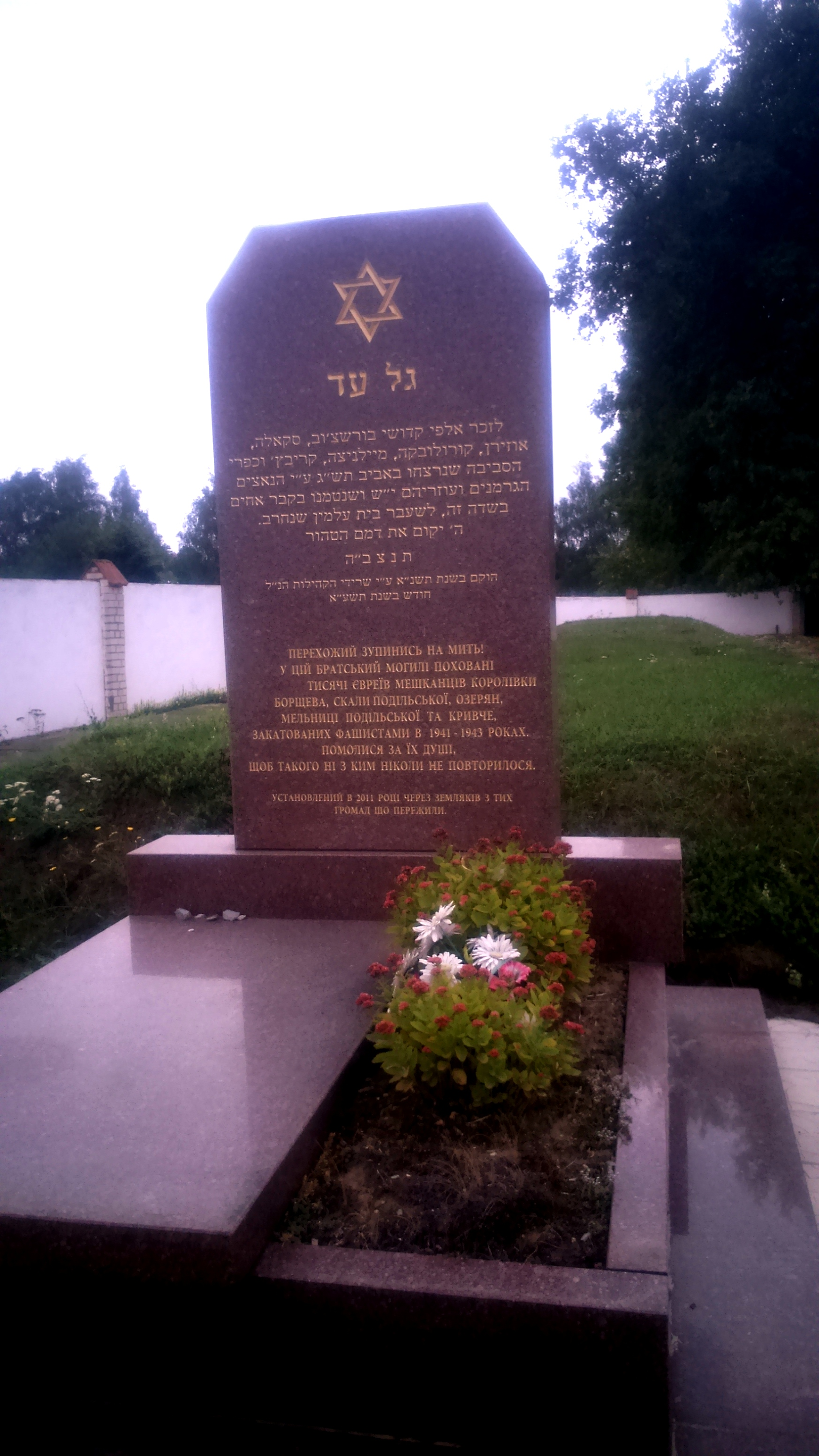
Monument to victims of the Borshchiv Jewish Ghetto in Borshchiv from the side of village Verkhnyakivtsi

Borshchiv Ghetto (Ukrainian: Борщівське гето) was a Jewish ghetto established and operated by Nazi Germany in the Ukrainian town of Borshchiv, Borshchiv Raion, Ternopil Oblast, between April 1942 and July 1943.

== Ghetto history ==
The ghetto was formed in Borshchiv on 1 April 1942 and operated until July 1943. The number of inhabitants was about 4,000 people. At first there was no fence around it, but the Jewish inhabitants were not allowed to go outside. The occupants came from Borshchiv and Ozeriany, Melnytsia-Podilska, Skala-Podilska, Kryvche, Korolivka, Chortkiv and Zolochiv.

On 26 September 1942 about 100 prisoners, mostly old and sick, were shot on the square, and about 800 were sent to Bełżec. A group of youth was sent to Yaniv concentration camp in Lviv. On 13 March 1943 other 400 people were sent to Bełżec. On 19 April 1943 German and Ukrainian police shot about 800 people in a Jewish cemetery (in the outskirts of town, on the road to Verkhnyakivtsi). On 5 June another 700 people were executed at the cemetery. From 9 to 14 June 1943, an additional 1,800 ghetto prisoners were killed. Then the Nazis considered Borschiv "Judenfrei" ("free of Jews").

Some Jews, however, were hiding in various recesses both in the ghetto and in other places. Occupation authorities announced that those who came out by themselves would not be killed and would instead be sent to a labor camp. About 360 people believed them, but they were executed on 14 August 1943.

Several Jewish physicians from the ghetto were saved by the Ukrainian Insurgent Army (UPA), where they helped in the fight against the Nazis. In 1943 doctor Tayblis from Korolivka and doctor Monya Helyar from Turylche were rescued.

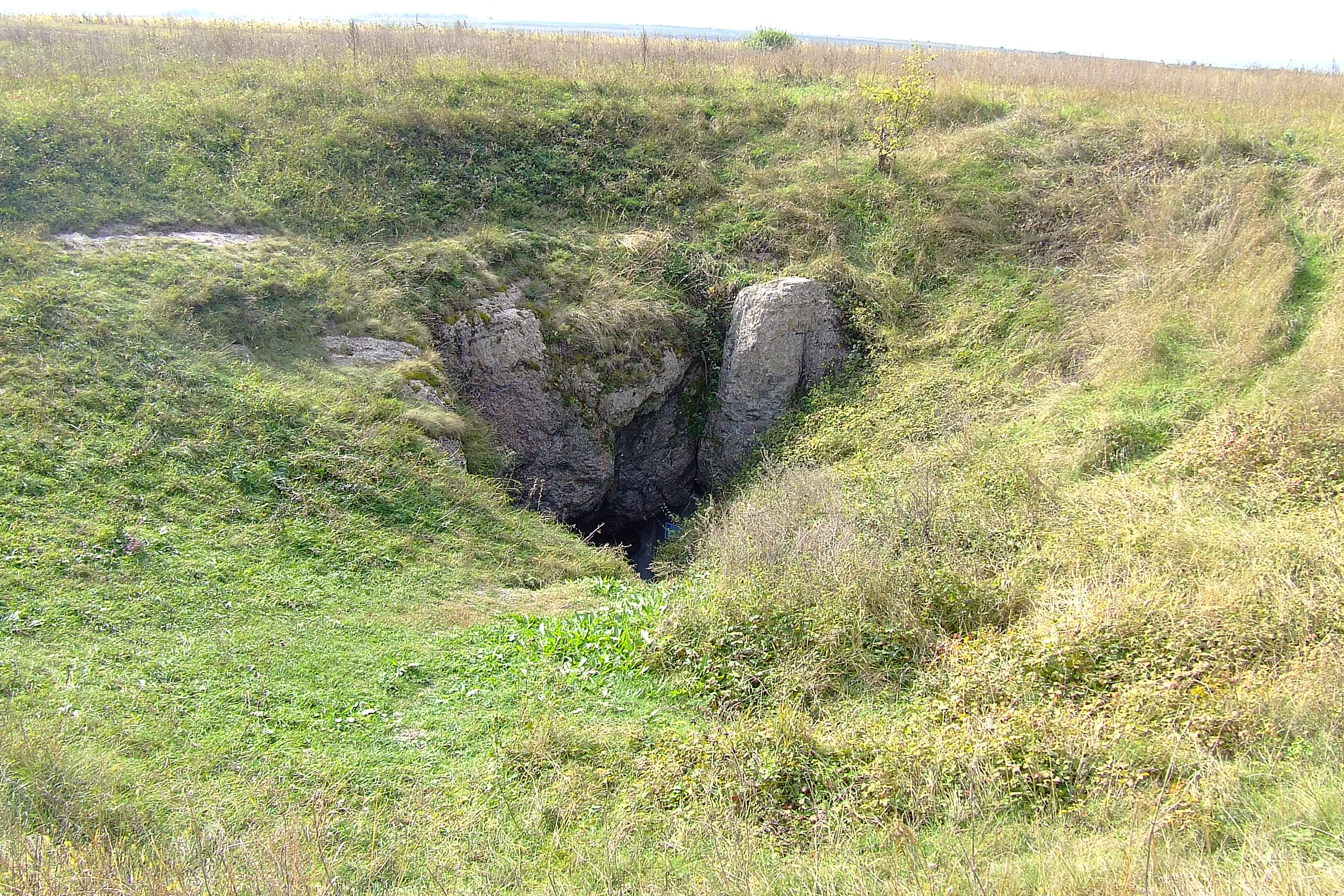
Verteba cave entrance.

Some people succeeded in hiding until the end of the war. For example, Saul and Esther Stermer, their six children, and several other Jewish families from Korolivka hid in Verteba Cave near Bilche-Zolote. When raids intensified and two of the escapees were killed, they went into hiding in Priest's Grotto. The 38 people had been hiding there for 511 days. Local farmers helped the Jews by bringing them food and reporting some news. For example, one farmer gave them a wain of barley. The fugitives grounded the barley were able to feed themselves. In 1993, a police officer from New York and an amateur caver found the remains of their settlement in Priest's Grotto cave.

Some children who escaped death secretly lived with families of peasants. Many residents of Borshchiv Raion were awarded the title "Righteous Among the Nations".

== Commemoration ==
Passer, stop for a moment!
In this mass grave are buried
thousands of Jewish residents of Korolivka,
Borshchiv, Skala-Podilska, Ozeryany,
Melnytsia-Podilska and Kryvche,
murdered by the Nazis in 1941–1943.
Pray for their souls,
that such will never happen again to anyone.

— Translation of the inscription on the monument.
It is duplicated in Ukrainian and Hebrew.

In Borshchiv at the site of the destroyed Jewish cemetery during the Soviet occupation a sports complex was built. In 1990, after Ukraine gained independence, part of the stadium was reserved for the construction of the monument. It was finally established in 2011.

== Borshchiv Holocaust in culture ==
In April 2005, Reader's Digest published an article by Peter Lane Taylor's "Underground" about Zaid Shtermer and others left in caves.

American documentary filmmaker Janet Tobias in her film No Place on Earth described the life of Jews who were hiding in the Verteba and Priest's Grotto caves. Staged scenes, however, were not filmed in Ukraine, but instead in Hungary, in a similar cave. Filming in Priest's Grotto would require much time and money. Esther Stermer, her children and grandchildren in the movie were played by Hungarian actors.

== See also ==
- Jewish–Ukrainian relations in Eastern Galicia
