= Optymistychna Cave =

Gypsum cave system in Korolivka, Ukraine

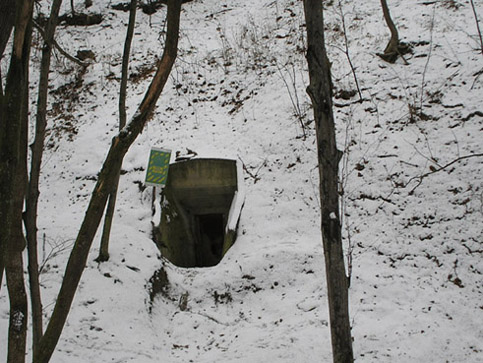
- Interactive map of Optymistychna Cave
- Location: near Ukrainian village of Korolivka, Chortkiv Raion, Ternopil Oblast
- Coordinates: 48°44′33″N 25°59′37″E
- Length: 230 km (140 mi)
- Discovery: 1966
- Geology: gypsum
- Website: optymistychna.com/en/

Optymistychna Cave (Ukrainian: Оптимістична, lit. 'optimistic') formerly known as Peshchera Optimistitscheskaya, (Note: This English transliteration was used during the Soviet era but is now deprecated.) is a gypsum cave located near the Ukrainian village of Korolivka, Chortkiv Raion, Ternopil Oblast. Approximately 264 km (164 mi) of passageways have been mapped within. As a result, it is the longest cave in Europe and the seventh-longest cave in the world. It is also the longest gypsum cave in the world.

== History ==
The cave complex was discovered by members of the Lviv speleological club Cyclope in 1966. It was entirely unknown before then. There have been more than 50 expeditions since its discovery, but exploration has slowed significantly in recent years, and very little surveying is currently being done. The cave is located very close to Priest's Grotto, the eleventh-longest cave in the world, but the two caves have not yet been found to be connected.

In 2008, the cave was recognized as a Natural Wonder of Ukraine.

== Geology ==
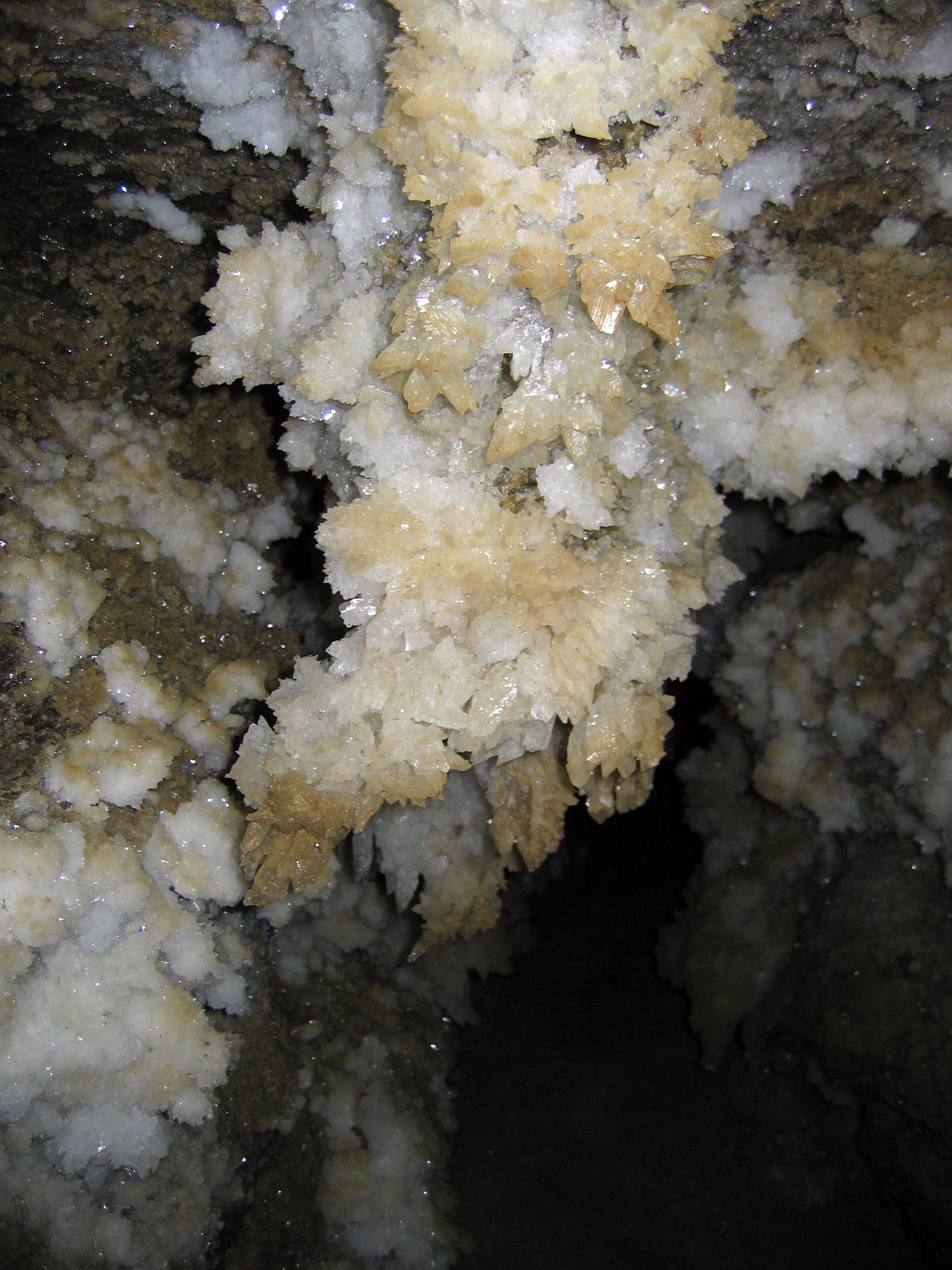
Speleothems inside Optymistychna Cave.

The entire cave lies under a 2-square-kilometre (0.77 sq mi) area in a layer of Neogene period gypsum that is less than 30 metres (98 ft) thick. The passages tend to be fairly small, no more than 3 metres (10 ft) wide and 1.5 metres (5 ft) tall, although at intersections they can be up to 10 metres (33 ft) tall. They are often choked with mud. They comprise a dense network on several levels, making Optymistychna known as a "maze cave".

Optymistychna's gypsum bed is topped with a limestone layer, which has seeped through into the cave via erosion and formed into calcite speleothems. At other places, the gypsum has formed crystals, often tinted a multitude of colors by mineral salts. In some areas, large gypsum rosettes have formed, colored black by manganese oxide.

== See also ==
- List of longest caves
