= Klymentyna Popovych-Boiarska =

Ukrainian writer (1863–1945)

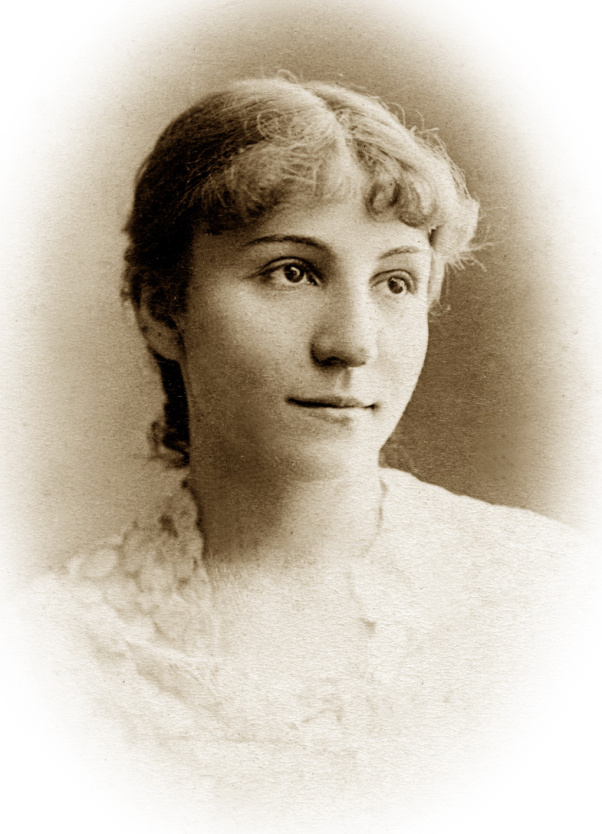
- Native name: Климентина Карлівна Попович-Боярська
- Born: 3 February 1863 Veldizh, Galicia
- Died: 7 May 1945 (aged 82) Babyntsi, Ternopil Oblast

Klymentyna Karlivna Popovych-Boiarska (Ukrainian: Климентина Карлівна Попович-Боярська; 3 February 1863 – 7 May 1945) was a Ukrainian writer, poet, and elementary school teacher born in Galicia. She was active in the Ukrainian women's movement, and wrote alongside Ivan Franko and Nataliya Kobrynska.

== Biography ==
Klymentyna Popovych was born on 3 February 1863 in Veldizh, a Galician town (known as Shevchenkove in the Kalush Raion of modern-day Ukraine). Popovych grew up learning to speak German and Polish, which was common for Austrian-Polish patriotism at the time. She attended a high school in Lviv, and discovered her love of writing in Ukrainian while she was studying in the city.

She wrote to, and later studied under, Ivan Franko. The two became close friends and he was an editor for some of her writings. In 1884, Popovych's debut poems—edited by Franko—were published in Zorya (Ukrainian: Зоря). Her friendship with Franko lasted for almost 20 years.

Popovych wrote about women and the Galician intelligentsia, and these works began to be published in the 1880s. Like her father, Popovych also became a teacher, and from the 1890s to the 1900s she taught in Bukovina.

Popovych later became engaged in a romantic relationship with Ivan Franko. He wrote a poem on the topic of love titled "KP" in honor of Popovych, and she wrote him a poem titled "Once upon a time" that was included in a collection of literature written to Franko. However, she was only one of Franko's lovers out of a group of three women.

Eventually, she married the priest Omelyan Boyarsky. They lived in a parish together with four children in Novosilka-Kostyukova (modern-day Novosilka). Her husband became jealous of her relationship with Franko, and mocked her for it. After retaliating, he began to cheat on her with a mistress.

After marriage, Popovych reluctantly withdrew from her literary work and instead focused on supporting her family. Although she was a writer, she was forbidden by her husband from engaging in the cultural and literary world. He did not agree with women working as writers, and he subsequently burned her poetry notebooks. Despite this, Popovych continued to try to write.

Her husband died in 1944 after being shot by the Red Army on their church doorstep. After his death, Popovych moved to the village of Babyntsi in the Ternopil region. There, she died on 7 May 1945.

== Writing ==
Among Popovych's works were poems and short stories. Her writing appeared in anthologies, women's periodicals, and magazines, including Zorya (Ukrainian: Зоря), Dilo, and the Literary and Scientific Journal. In 1990, a collection of her works was compiled by Petro Babiak and published in Lviv.

Other than Galician culture and women, Popovych wrote anecdotes about her acquaintances, Ivan Franko and Nataliya Kobrynska. She was part of the Ukrainian women's movement with both Franko and Kobrynska, and later contributed writing to The First Garland (Pershyi Vinok), Kobrynska's almanac and collection of writing by Ukrainian women. In The First Garland, Popovych's poems "Ordinary History" (Ukrainian: Звичайна історія) and "Where is my God?" (Ukrainian: Де Бог мій?) were published.

Popovych additionally contributed to the almanac Ukrainian Muse (Ukrainian: Українська муза) and the anthology Chords (Ukrainian: Акорди). At one point, she wrote an ethnographic study of Ukrainian embroidery.

== Legacy ==
In 1952, academic M. Wozniak published 28 letters sent between Ivan Franko and Popovych in a collection of materials related to Franko. Popovych's poems were also included in a 1968 anthology of Ukrainian women poets.

A memorial plaque was unveiled at the house where Popovych lived in Babyntsi in 1988.
