= Borshchiv urban hromada =

Hromada in Ternopil Oblast, Ukraine

Borshchiv urban hromada Борщівська міська громада
- hromada
- Location within Ternopil Oblast Location within Ukraine
- Coordinates: 48°48′10″N 26°2′11″E
- Country: Ukraine
- Oblast (province): Ternopil Oblast
- Raion (district): Chortkiv Raion
- Administrative centre: Borshchiv

Government
  - Hromada head: Igor Kazymyrovych Chopyk

Population (2022)
  - Total: 28,717
- Cities: 1
- Villages: 25

Borshchiv urban hromada (Ukrainian: Борщівська міська громада, romanized: Borshchivska miska hromada) is a hromada of Ukraine, in Chortkiv Raion of Ternopil Oblast. Its administrative centre is Borshchiv. The hromada has a population of 28,717 (2022 estimate)

Until 18 July 2020, the hromada belonged to Borshchiv Raion. The raion was abolished in July 2020 as part of the administrative reform of Ukraine, which reduced the number of raions of Ternopil Oblast to three. The area of Borshchiv Raion was merged into Chortkiv Raion.

== Subdivisions and population ==
- Borshchiv
- Babyntsi
- Hlybochok
- Hrabivtsi
- Khudivtsi
- Konstantsiya
- Korolivka
- Kozachchyna
- Kryvche
- Lanivtsi
- Mushkativka
- Ozeriany
- Pylatkivtsi
- Pyshchatyntsi
- Sapohiv
- Skoviatyn
- Slobidka-Mushkativs'ka
- Strilkivtsi
- Shuparka
- Shyshkivtsi
- Tulyn
- Tsyhany
- Verkhnyakivtsi
- Vovkivtsi
- Vysichka
- Zhylyntsi
