= Mushkativka =

Mushkativka Мушкатівка
- Village
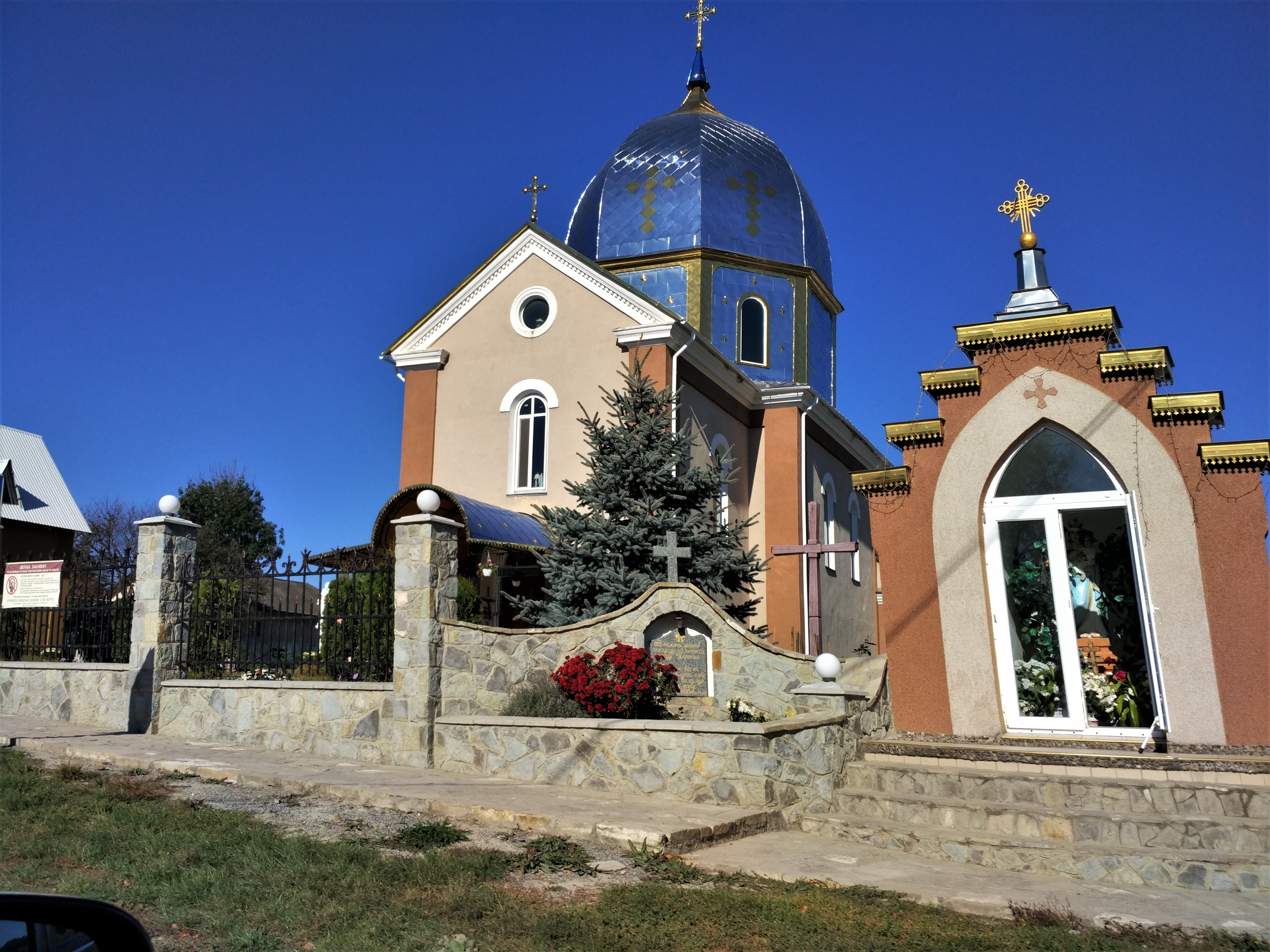
- Church in Mushkativka

- Location in Ukraine Mushkativka (Ternopil Oblast)
- Coordinates: 48°48′23″N 26°06′05″E
- Country: Ukraine
- Oblast: Ternopil Oblast
- District: Chortkiv Raion

Population
  - Total: 1,166
- Time zone: UTC+2 (EET)
  - Summer (DST): UTC+3 (EEST)
- Postal code: 48766

Mushkativka (Ukrainian: Мушкатівка, Polish: Muszkatówka), a village in Ukraine, is located within Chortkiv Raion of Ternopil Oblast. It belongs to Borshchiv urban hromada, one of the hromadas of Ukraine.
