= Korolivka, Chortkiv Raion =

Korolivka Королівка
- Village
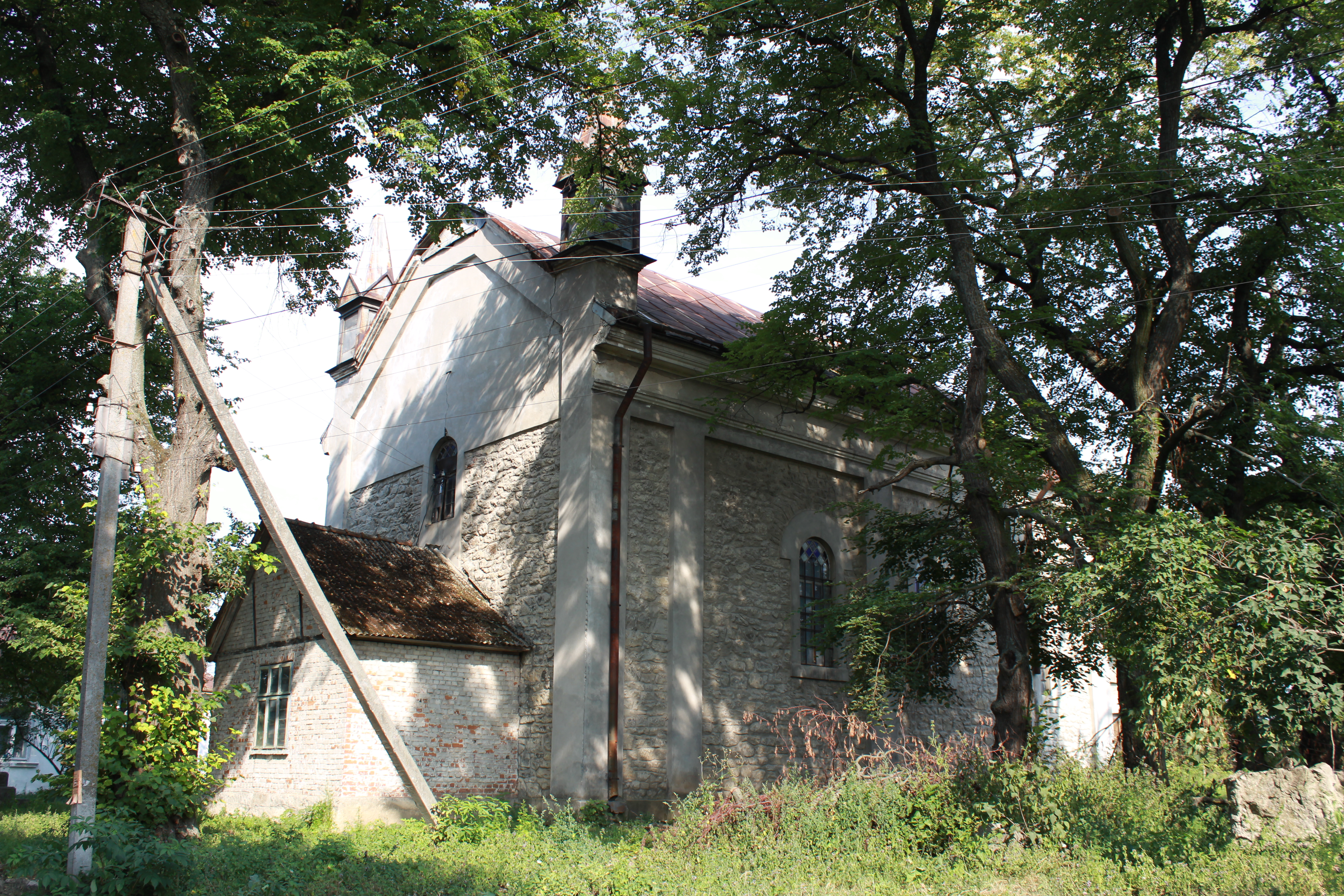
- Church of the Resurrection of Jesus Christ

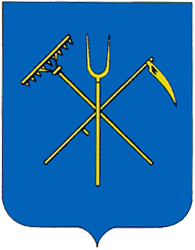
- Coat of arms

- Location in Ukraine Korolivka (Ukraine)
- Coordinates: 48°44′32″N 25°59′28″E
- Country: Ukraine
- Oblast: Ternopil Oblast
- Raion: Chortkiv Raion
- Hromada: Borshchiv urban hromada
- Established: 1821

Area
  - Total: 0.580 km^{2} (0.224 sq mi)

Population
  - Total: 92
  - Urban density: 158.62/km^{2} (410.8/sq mi)
- Time zone: UTC+2 (EET)
  - Summer (DST): UTC+3 (EEST)
- Postal code: 48630
- Area code: +380 3554

Korolivka (Ukrainian: Королівка; Polish: Korolówka) is a village located on the Tupa River in Chortkiv Raion of Ternopil Oblast in western Ukraine. It belongs to Borshchiv urban hromada, one of the hromadas of Ukraine. Korolivka belongs to the administration of Holovchyntsi village. Located near it is Optymistychna Cave, the longest cave in Eurasia.

Until 18 July 2020, Korolivka belonged to Borshchiv Raion. The raion was abolished in July 2020 as part of the administrative reform of Ukraine, which reduced the number of raions of Ternopil Oblast to three. The area of Borshchiv Raion was merged into Chortkiv Raion.

== Religion ==
There are two stone churches in the village: Church of the Resurrection of Jesus Christ (built in 1997) and Church of the Conception of St. John the Baptist (1851).

== Population ==
The population of the village was 92 as of 2001.

=== People from Korolivka ===
- Mykhailo Hnydiuk, scientist and doctor
- Jacob Frank, founder of Frankism, born in Korolivka in 1726
