= Shuparka =

Shuparka Шупарка
- Village
- Location in Ukraine Shuparka (Ukraine)
- Coordinates: 48°41′N 26°00′E
- Country: Ukraine
- Oblast: Ternopil Oblast
- District: Chortkiv Raion

Population
  - Total: 1,907
- Time zone: UTC+2 (EET)
  - Summer (DST): UTC+3 (EEST)
- Postal code: 48743

Shuparka (Ukrainian: Шупарка, Polish: Szuparka), a village in Ukraine, is located within Chortkiv Raion of Ternopil Oblast. It belongs to Borshchiv urban hromada, one of the hromadas of Ukraine.
