= Urozhaine, Ternopil Oblast =

Settlement in Ternopil Oblast, Ukraine

Coordinates: 48°33′58″N 26°16′33″E

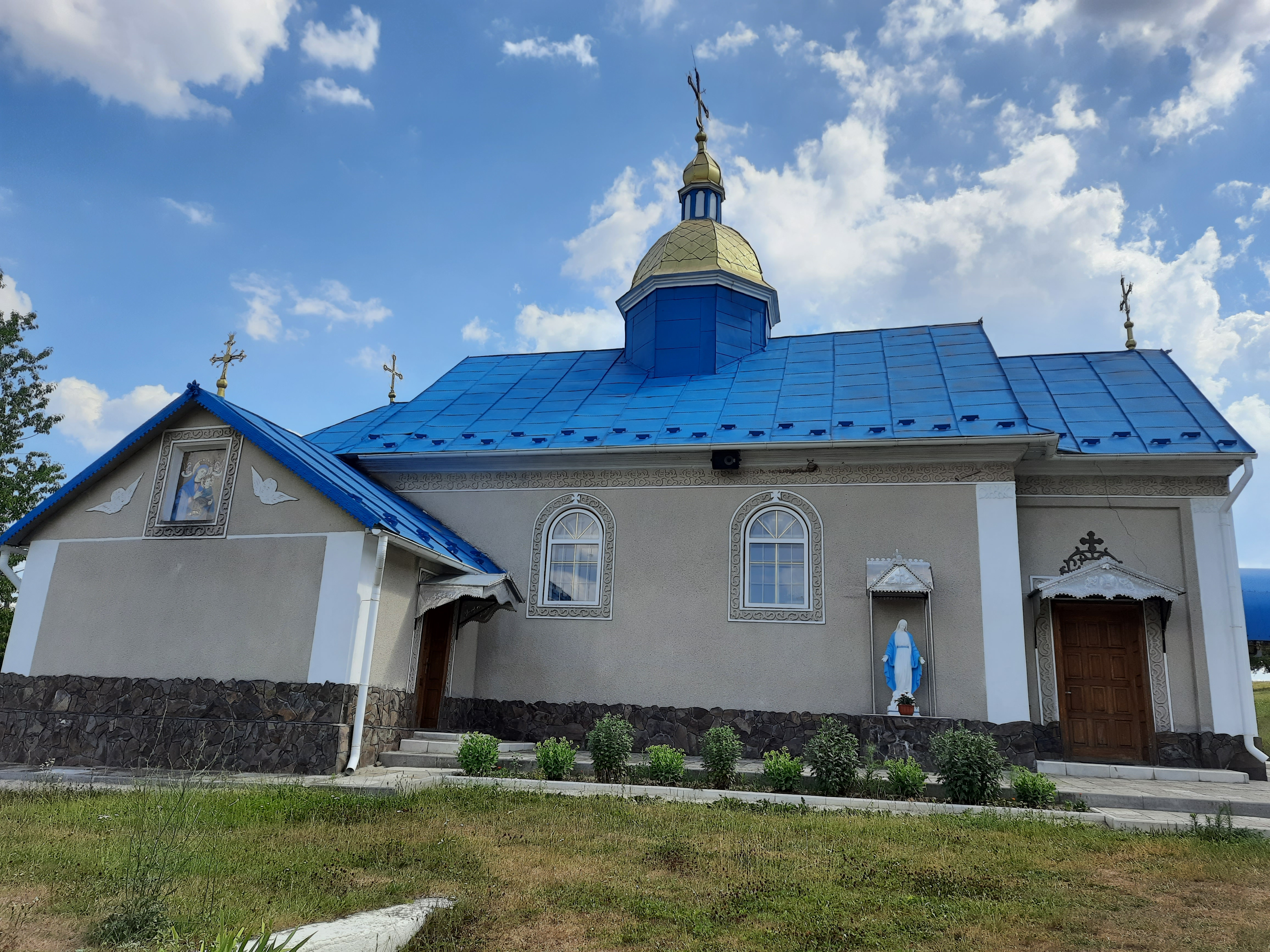
Church of the Nativity of the Theotokos, Urozhaine

Urozhaine (Ukrainian: Урожайне) is a village in Ternopil Oblast, Ukraine. As of 2001, it had 313 inhabitants.
