= Vovkivtsi, Chortkiv Raion, Ternopil Oblast =

Vovkivtsi Вовківці
- Village
- Location in Ukraine Vovkivtsi (Ukraine)
- Coordinates: 48°46′25″N 26°05′27″E
- Country: Ukraine
- Oblast: Ternopil Oblast
- District: Chortkiv Raion

Population
  - Total: 1,316
- Time zone: UTC+2 (EET)
  - Summer (DST): UTC+3 (EEST)
- Postal code: 48724

Vovkivtsi (Ukrainian: Вовківці, Polish: Wołkowce), a village in Ukraine, is located within Chortkiv Raion of Ternopil Oblast. It belongs to Borshchiv urban hromada, one of the hromadas of Ukraine.
