= Kozachchyna =

Kozachchyna Козаччина
- Village
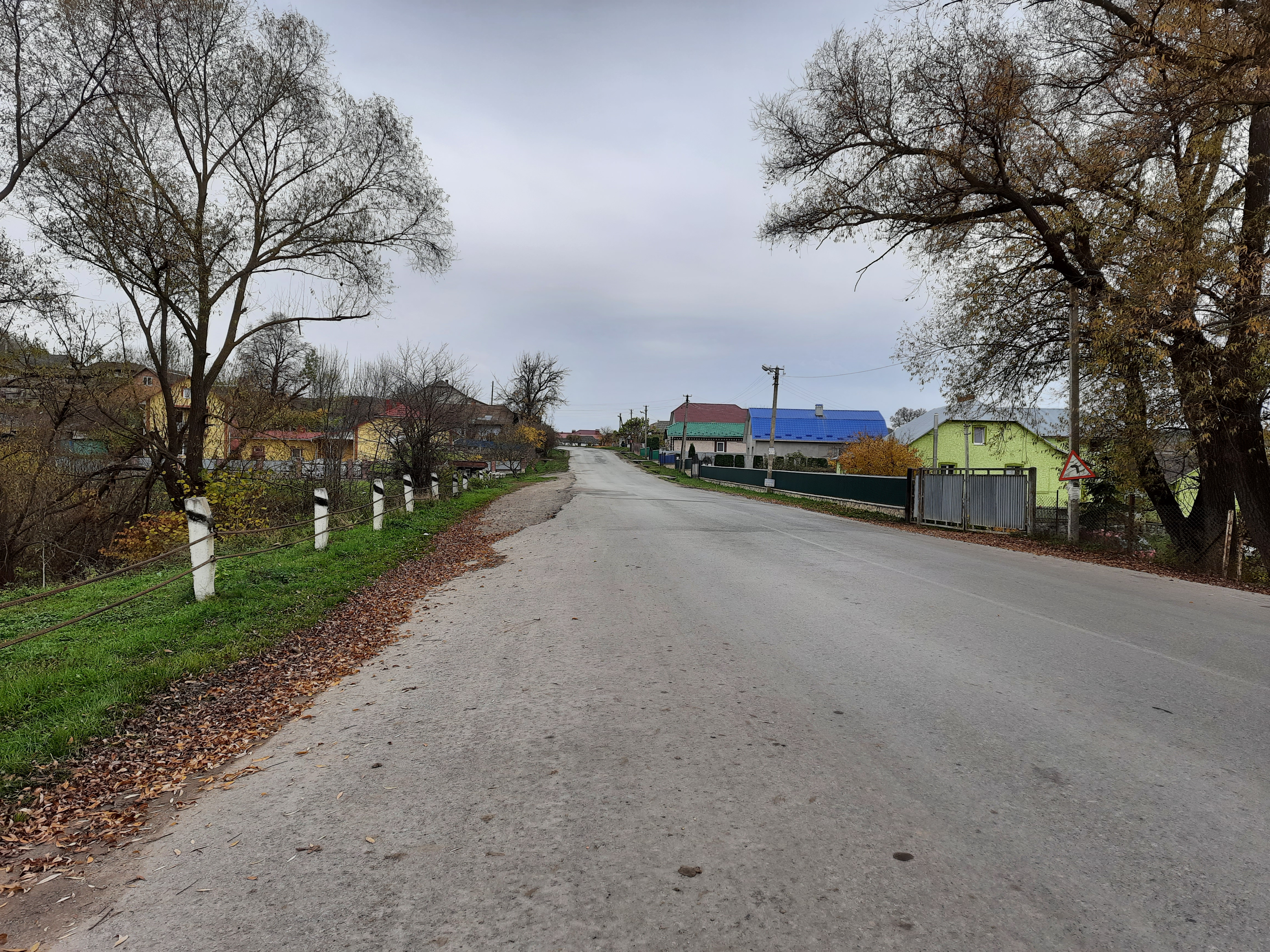

- Location in Ukraine Kozachchyna (Ukraine)
- Coordinates: 48°51′25″N 26°00′05″E
- Country: Ukraine
- Oblast: Ternopil Oblast
- District: Chortkiv Raion

Population
  - Total: 410
- Time zone: UTC+2 (EET)
  - Summer (DST): UTC+3 (EEST)
- Postal code: 48716

Kozachchyna (Ukrainian: Козаччина, Polish: Kozaczyzna), a village in Ukraine, is located within Chortkiv Raion of Ternopil Oblast. It belongs to Borshchiv urban hromada, one of the hromadas of Ukraine.
