= Hrabivtsi =

Hrabivtsi Грабівці
- Village
- Location in Ukraine Hrabivtsi (Ukraine)
- Coordinates: 48°53′58″N 26°02′41″E
- Country: Ukraine
- Oblast: Ternopil Oblast
- District: Chortkiv Raion

Population
  - Total: 69
- Time zone: UTC+2 (EET)
  - Summer (DST): UTC+3 (EEST)
- Postal code: 48713

Hrabivtsi (Ukrainian: Грабівці, Polish: Grabowce), a village in Ukraine, is located within Chortkiv Raion of Ternopil Oblast. It belongs to Borshchiv urban hromada, one of the hromadas of Ukraine.
