= Konstantsiya =

Konstantsiya Констанція
- Village
- Location in Ukraine Konstantsiya (Ukraine)
- Coordinates: 48°51′25″N 25°56′33″E
- Country: Ukraine
- Oblast: Ternopil Oblast
- District: Chortkiv Raion

Population (2014)
  - Total: ▼373
- Time zone: UTC+2 (EET)
  - Summer (DST): UTC+3 (EEST)
- Postal code: 48711

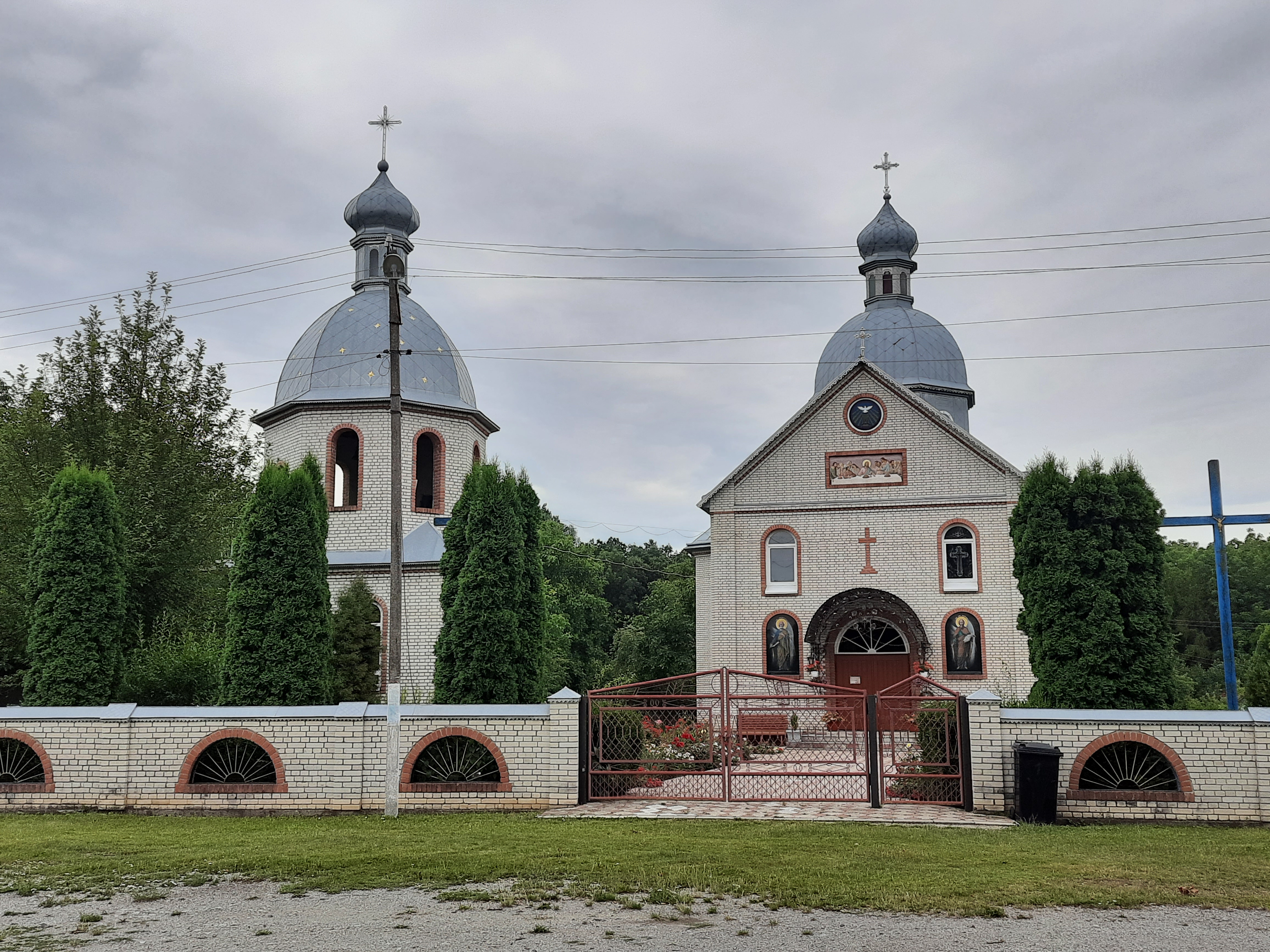
Church of Saints Peter and Paul Constantia, Chortkiv district, Ternopil region

Konstantsiya (Ukrainian: Констанція, Polish: Konstancja), a village in Ukraine, is located within Chortkiv Raion of Ternopil Oblast. It belongs to Borshchiv urban hromada, one of the hromadas of Ukraine.
