= Strilkivtsi =

Strilkivtsi Стрілківці
- Village
- Location in Ukraine Strilkivtsi (Ukraine)
- Coordinates: 48.7680°N 25.9907°E
- Country: Ukraine
- Oblast: Ternopil Oblast
- District: Chortkiv Raion
- Established: 1409

Population
  - Total: ▼898
- Time zone: UTC+2 (EET)
  - Summer (DST): UTC+3 (EEST)
- Postal code: 48734

Strilkivtsi (Ukrainian: Стрілківці, Polish: Strzałkowce), a village in Ukraine, is located on the Nichlava river, within Chortkiv Raion of Ternopil Oblast. It belongs to Borshchiv urban hromada, one of the hromadas of Ukraine. There is a cave Priest's Grotto near the village.

== History ==
The village was first mentioned in 1409. There is a legend of the name of the village. It is said that archers of Galician princes, who guarded the fortress, founded the village. Also, there is another version. The name is similar to the river Strilka, and the village is situated along the "straight river like an arrow".

In 1907 a reading room of society Prosvita was founded in the village.

Until 18 July 2020, Strilkivtsi belonged to Borshchiv Raion. The raion was abolished in July 2020 as part of the administrative reform of Ukraine, which reduced the number of raions of Ternopil Oblast to three. The area of Borshchiv Raion was merged into Chortkiv Raion.

== Monuments ==
There is a church of Dormition of the Mother of God (1816), Roman Catholic Church and a chapel (2000).

== Notable natives ==
- graphic designer Ivan Balan
- artist P. Stetsko
- public figures B. Rokochy and V. Skoropad
