= Sapohiv, Ternopil Oblast =

Sapohiv Сапогів
- Village
- Location in Ukraine Sapohiv (Ukraine)
- Coordinates: 48°43′47″N 26°05′11″E
- Country: Ukraine
- Oblast: Ternopil Oblast
- District: Chortkiv Raion

Population
  - Total: 876
- Time zone: UTC+2 (EET)
  - Summer (DST): UTC+3 (EEST)
- Postal code: 48736

Sapohiv (Ukrainian: Сапогів, Polish: Sapohów), a village in Ukraine, is located within Chortkiv Raion of Ternopil Oblast. It belongs to Borshchiv urban hromada, one of the hromadas of Ukraine.
