= Chahari =

Rural locality in Ternopil Oblast, Ukraine

Chahari Чагарі
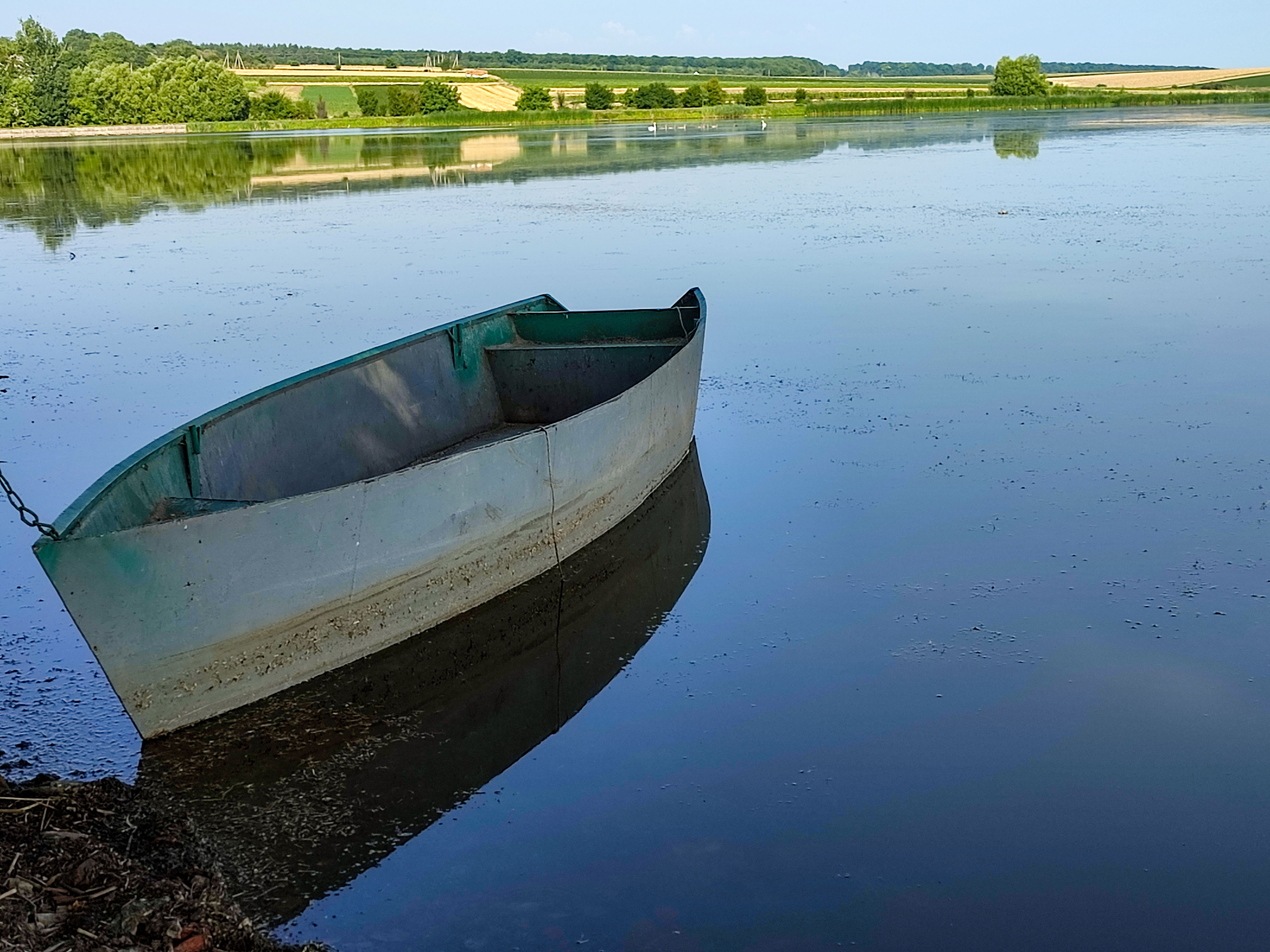
- Chahari Pond

- Location in Ternopil Oblast
- Coordinates: 49°06′12″N 25°58′18″E
- Country: Ukraine
- Oblast: Ternopil Oblast
- Raion: Chortkiv Raion
- Hromada: Vasylkivtsi Hromada
- Time zone: UTC+2 (EET)
  - Summer (DST): UTC+3 (EEST)
- Postal code: 48271

Chahari (Ukrainian: Чагарі) is a village in Vasylkivtsi rural hromada, Chortkiv Raion, Ternopil Oblast, Ukraine.

== History ==
After the 1st partition of the Polish-Lithuanian Commonwealth, the village belonged to Austria from 1772 (Zalishchyky Circus, from 1816 – Chortkiv). In 1863–1914 it was part of the Husiatyn Poviat.

After the liquidation of the Husiatyn Raion on 19 July 2020, the village became part of the Ternopil Raion.

== Religion ==
- Saint Demetrius church (1993, brick)

== Sources ==
- Гринюка Б. Коцюбинці та Чагарі: історико-краєзнавчий нарис, Тернопіль : Осадца Ю.В., 2019, 592 s., ISBN 978-617-7516-81-0.
