= Tulyn, Ukraine =

Tulyn Тулин
- Village
- Location in Ukraine Tulyn (Ukraine)
- Coordinates: 48°50′27″N 26°02′45″E
- Country: Ukraine
- Oblast: Ternopil Oblast
- District: Chortkiv Raion

Population
  - Total: 222
- Time zone: UTC+2 (EET)
  - Summer (DST): UTC+3 (EEST)
- Postal code: 48716

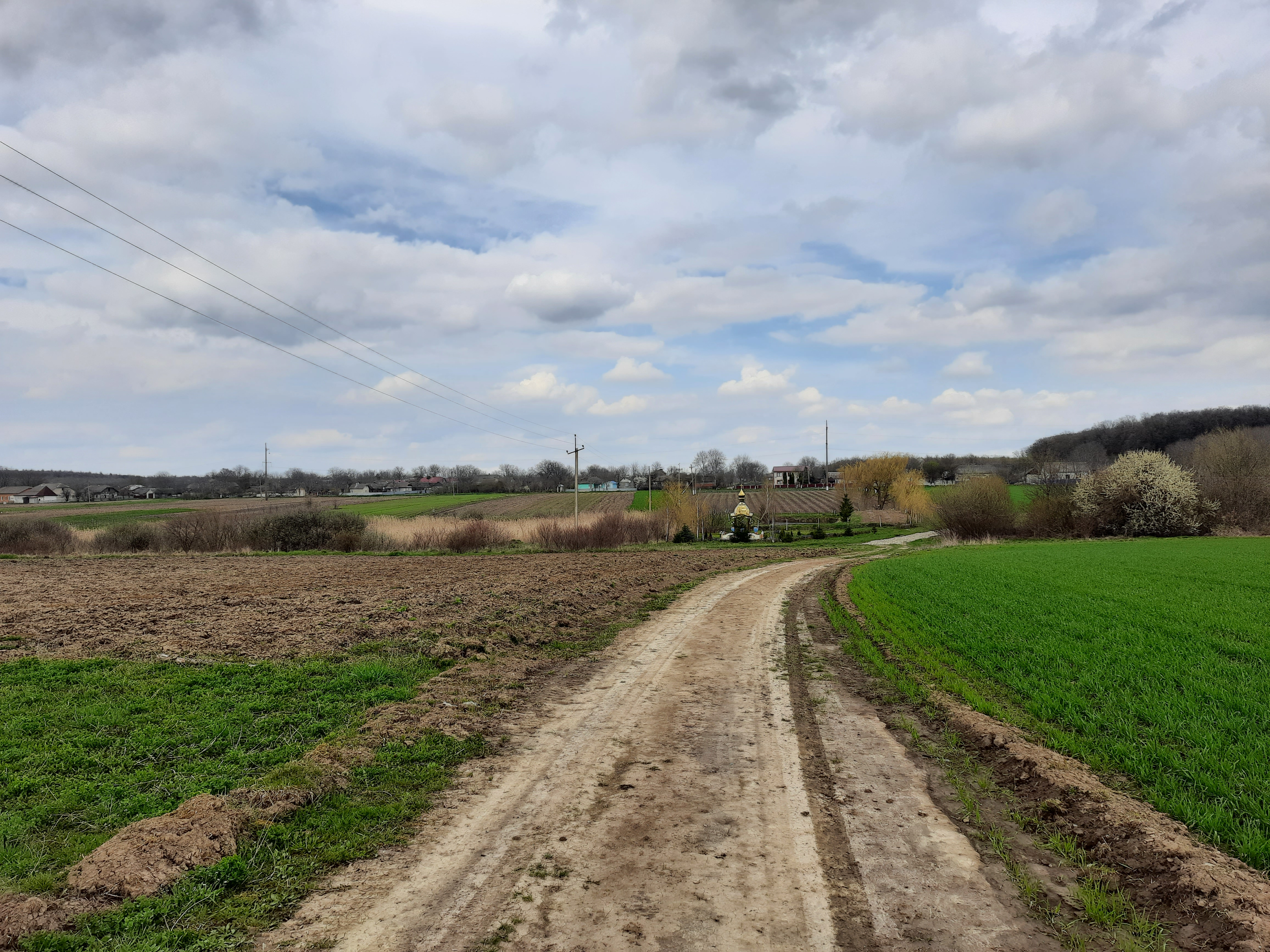

Tulyn (Ukrainian: Тулин), a village in Ukraine, is located within Chortkiv Raion of Ternopil Oblast. It belongs to Borshchiv urban hromada, one of the hromadas of Ukraine.
