= Ustia, Ukraine =

Village in Chortkiv Raion, Ukraine

Ustia Устя
- Village
- Location within Ternopil Oblast Location within Ukraine
- Coordinates: 48.61333°N 26.08667°E
- Country: Ukraine
- Oblast: Ternopil
- Raion: Chortkiv
- Hromada: Melnytsia-Podilska settlement hromada

Population (1921)
  - Total: 1,428

Ustia (Ukrainian: Устя, Polish: Uście Biskupie) is a village in Ukraine located in Chortkiv Raion of Ternopil Oblast. It belongs to Melnytsia-Podilska settlement hromada, one of the hromadas of Ukraine.

In 1880, the Jewish population of the town was 860 people. In 1921, the total population was 1,428 inhabitants.

Until 18 July 2020, Ustia belonged to Borshchiv Raion. The raion was abolished in July 2020 as part of the administrative reform of Ukraine, which reduced the number of raions of Ternopil Oblast to three. The area of Borshchiv Raion was merged into Chortkiv Raion.
