= Slobidka-Mushkativs'ka =

Slobidka-Mushkativs'ka Слобідка-Мушкатівська
- Village
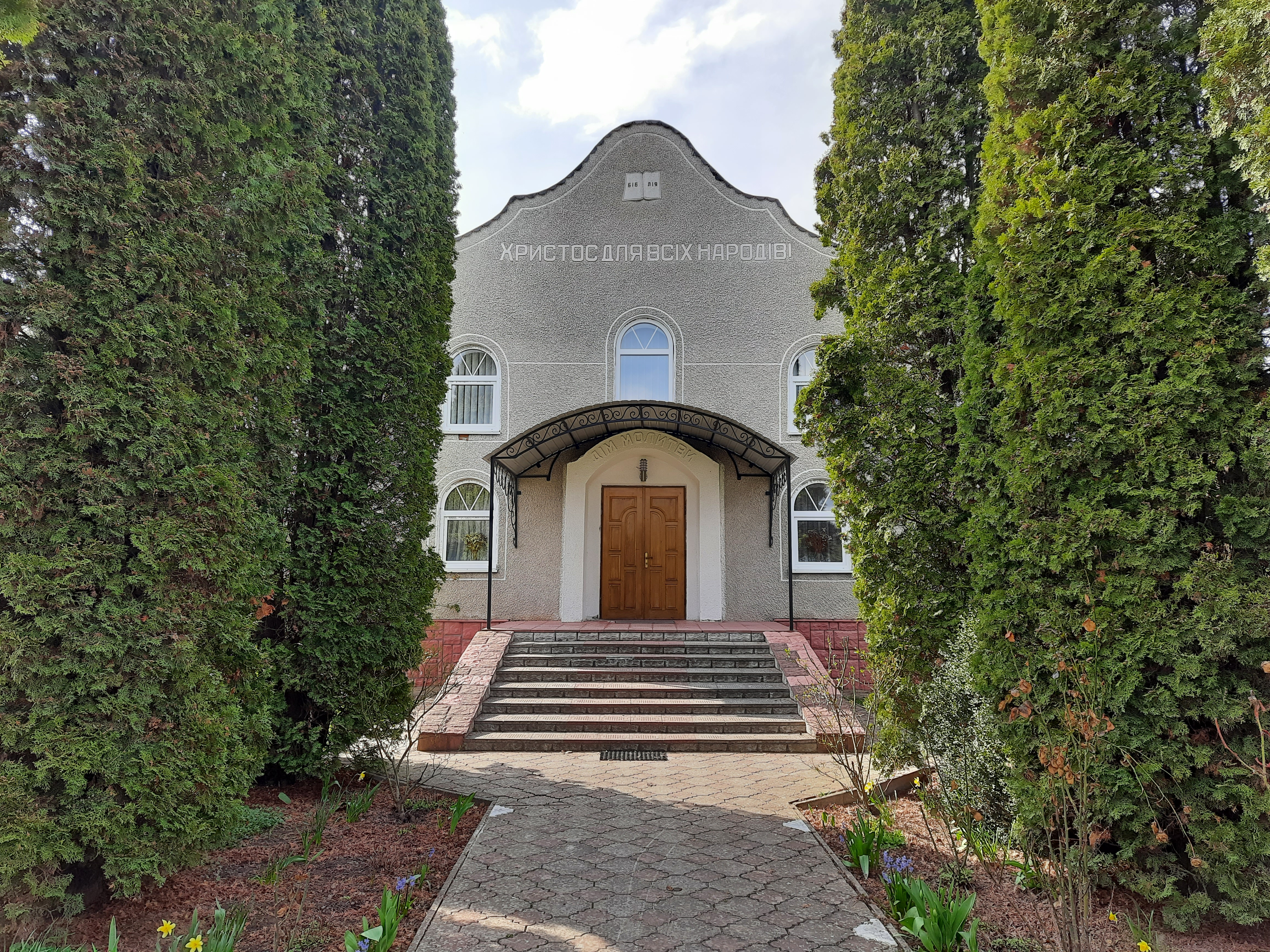

- Location in Ukraine Slobidka-Mushkativs'ka (Ukraine)
- Coordinates: 48°47′50″N 26°05′49″E
- Country: Ukraine
- Oblast: Ternopil Oblast
- District: Chortkiv Raion

Population
  - Total: 868
- Time zone: UTC+2 (EET)
  - Summer (DST): UTC+3 (EEST)
- Postal code: 48770

Slobidka-Mushkativs'ka (Ukrainian: Слобідка-Мушкатівська, Polish: Słobódka Muszkatowicka), a village in Ukraine, is located within Chortkiv Raion of Ternopil Oblast. It belongs to Borshchiv urban hromada, one of the hromadas of Ukraine.
