= Skoviatyn =

Skoviatyn Сков'ятин
- Village
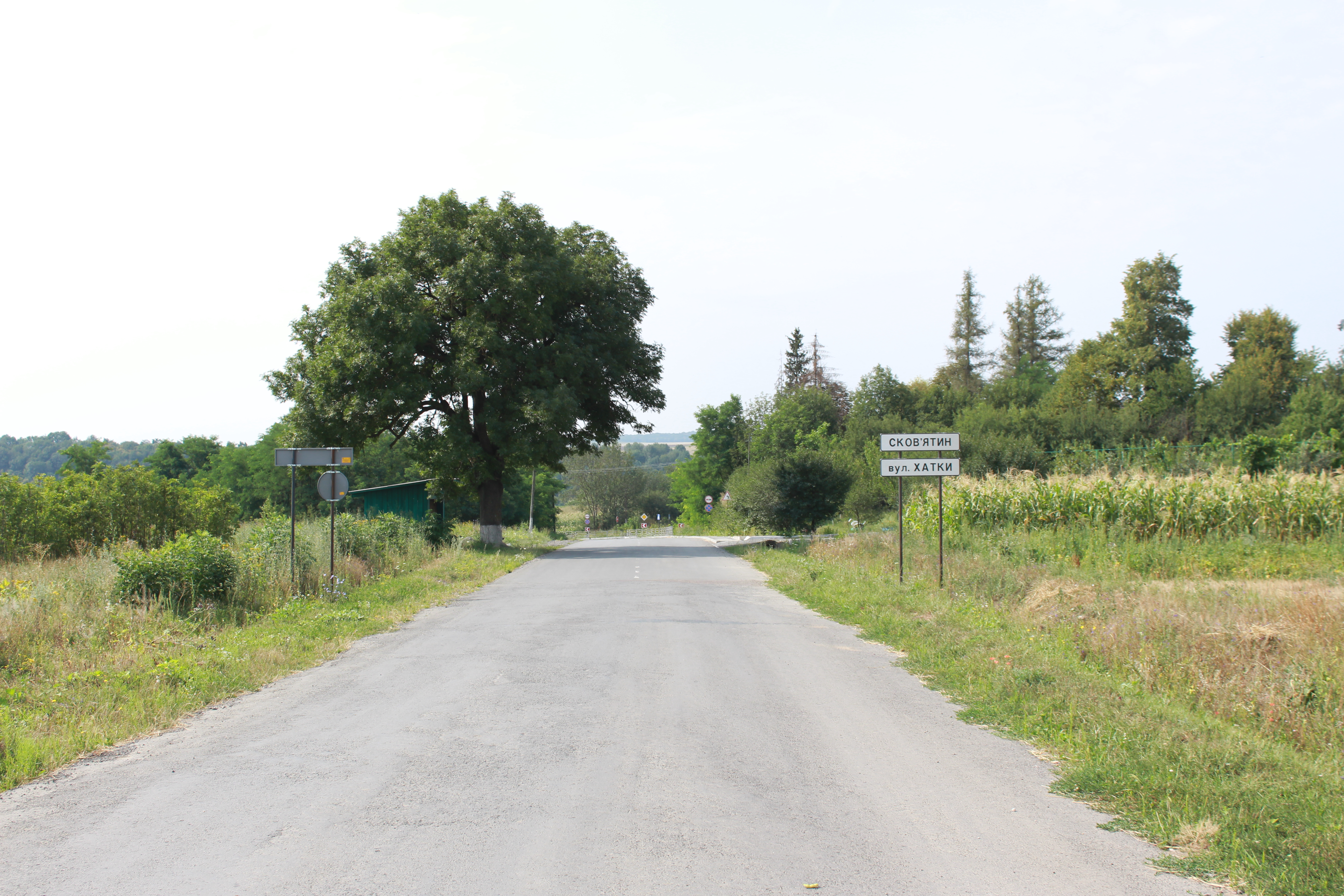
- Skoviatyn main road entering the village

- Location in Ukraine Skoviatyn (Ukraine)
- Coordinates: 48°43′35″N 26°01′50″E
- Country: Ukraine
- Oblast: Ternopil Oblast
- District: Chortkiv Raion

Population
  - Total: 530
- Time zone: UTC+2 (EET)
  - Summer (DST): UTC+3 (EEST)
- Postal code: 48737

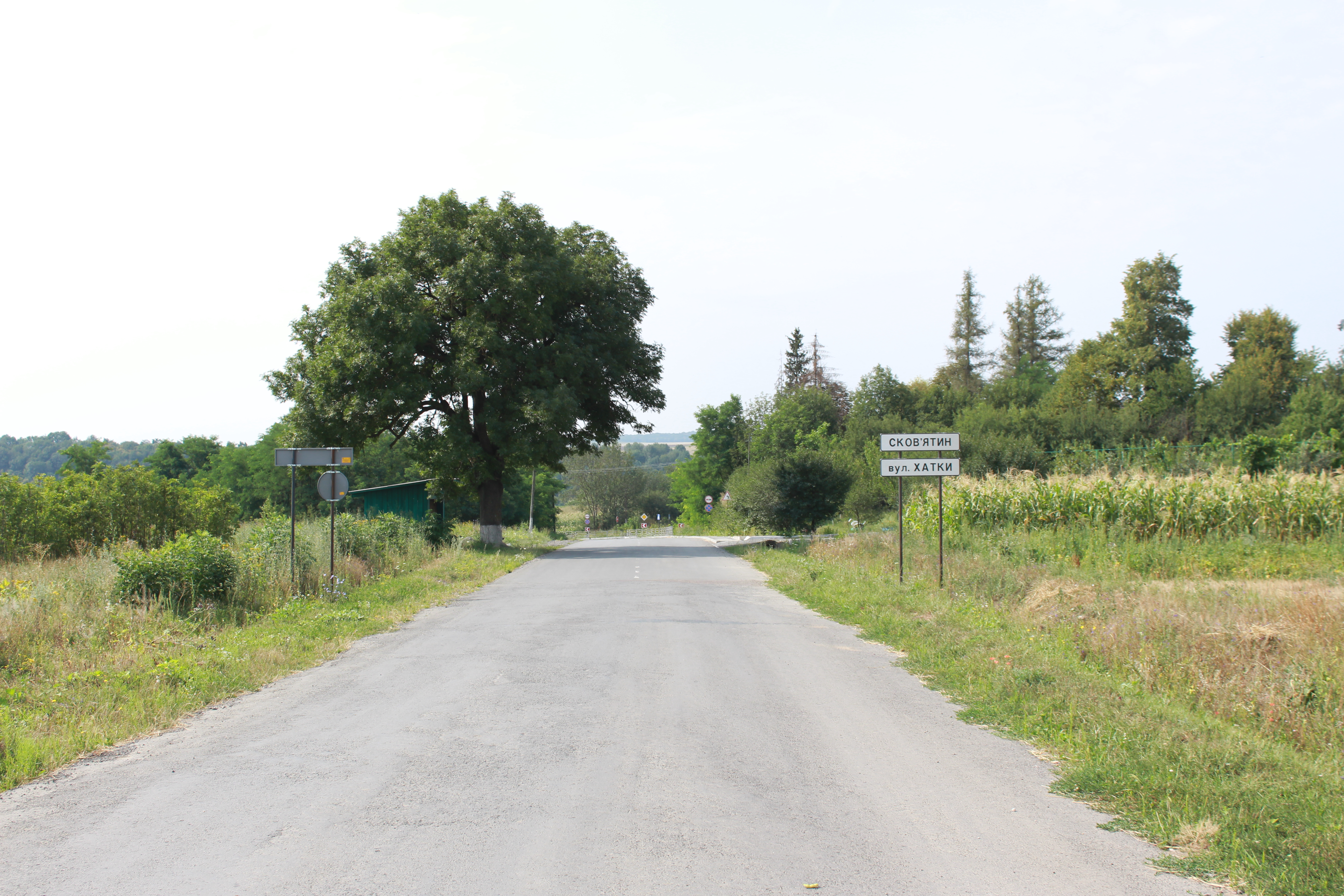

Skoviatyn (Ukrainian: Сков'ятин, Polish: Skowiatyn), a village in Ukraine, is located within Chortkiv Raion of Ternopil Oblast. It belongs to Borshchiv urban hromada, one of the hromadas of Ukraine.
