= Zhylyntsi =

Zhylyntsi Зелене
- Village
- Location in Ukraine Zhylyntsi (Ukraine)
- Coordinates: 48°52′59″N 26°00′11″E
- Country: Ukraine
- Oblast: Ternopil Oblast
- District: Chortkiv Raion

Population
  - Total: 404
- Time zone: UTC+2 (EET)
  - Summer (DST): UTC+3 (EEST)
- Postal code: 48713

Zhylyntsi (Ukrainian: Зелене, Polish: Zielińce), a village in Ukraine, is located within Chortkiv Raion of Ternopil Oblast. It belongs to Borshchiv urban hromada, one of the hromadas of Ukraine.
