= Shyshkivtsi, Ternopil Oblast =

Shyshkivtsi Шишківці
- Village
- Location in Ukraine
- Coordinates: 48°42′32″N 26°01′41″E
- Country: Ukraine
- Oblast: Ternopil Oblast
- District: Chortkiv Raion

Population
  - Total: 263
- Time zone: UTC+2 (EET)
  - Summer (DST): UTC+3 (EEST)
- Postal code: 48736

Shyshkivtsi (Ukrainian: Шишківці, Polish: Szyszkowce), a village in Ukraine, is located within Chortkiv Raion of Ternopil Oblast. It belongs to Borshchiv urban hromada, one of the hromadas of Ukraine.
