= Babyntsi, Ternopil Oblast =

Babyntsi Бабинці
- Village
- Location in Ukraine Babyntsi (Ukraine)
- Coordinates: 48°40′15″N 26°03′25″E
- Country: Ukraine
- Oblast: Ternopil Oblast
- District: Chortkiv Raion

Population
  - Total: 899
- Time zone: UTC+2 (EET)
  - Summer (DST): UTC+3 (EEST)
- Postal code: 48744

Babyntsi (Ukrainian: Бабинці, Polish: Babińce), a village in Ukraine, is located within Chortkiv Raion of Ternopil Oblast. It belongs to Borshchiv urban hromada, one of the hromadas of Ukraine.
