= Pylatkivtsi =

Pylatkivtsi Пилатківці
- Village
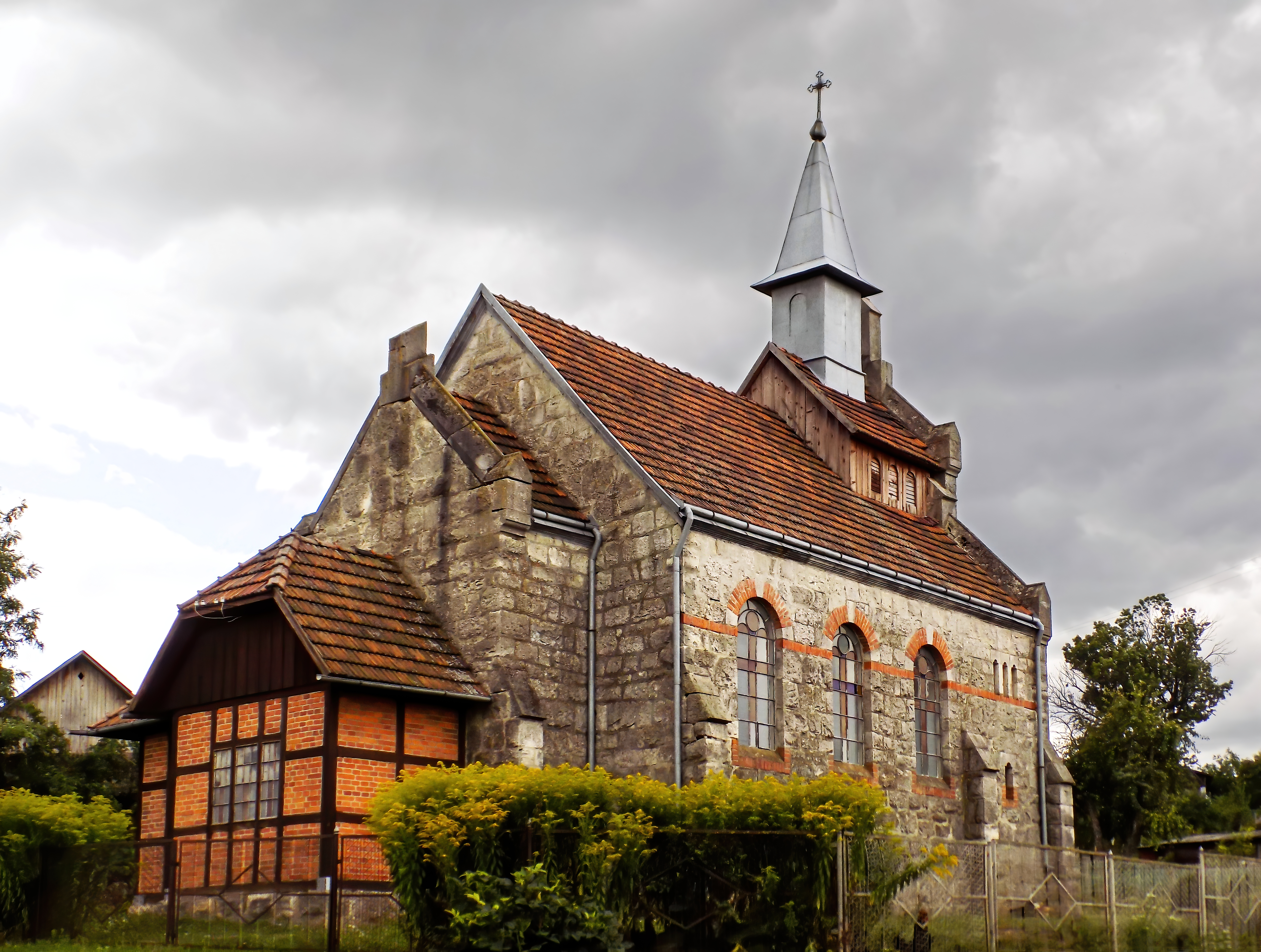
- Mausoleum of Sapieha family

- Location in Ukraine Pylatkivtsi (Ukraine)
- Coordinates: 48°53′25″N 26°00′00″E
- Country: Ukraine
- Oblast: Ternopil Oblast
- District: Chortkiv Raion

Population
  - Total: 424
- Time zone: UTC+2 (EET)
  - Summer (DST): UTC+3 (EEST)
- Postal code: 48713

Pylatkivtsi (Ukrainian: Пилатківці, Polish: Piłatkowce), a village in Ukraine, is located within Chortkiv Raion of Ternopil Oblast. It belongs to Borshchiv urban hromada, one of the hromadas of Ukraine.
