= Pyshchatyntsi =

Pyshchatyntsi Пищатинці
- Village
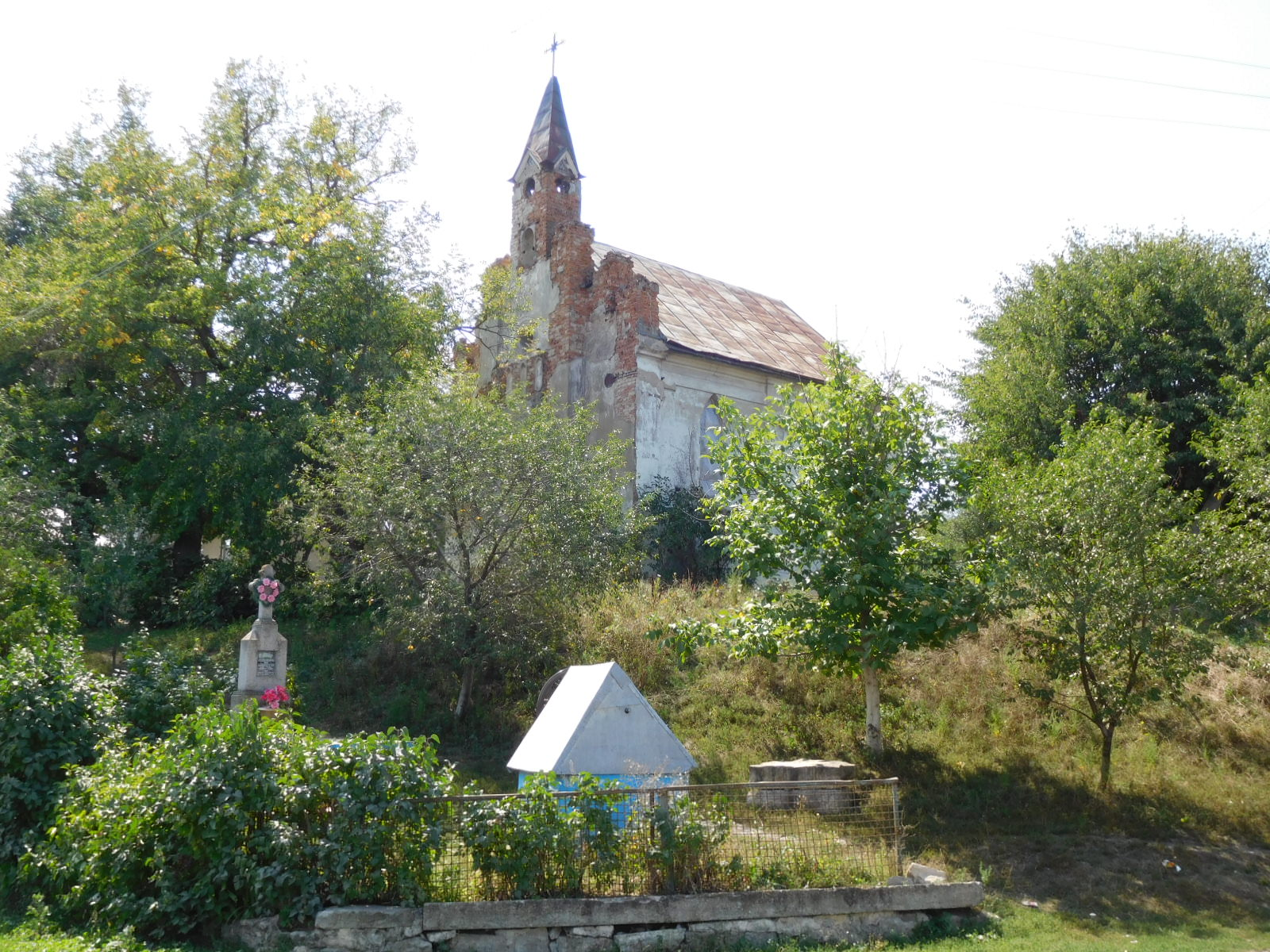
- Roman Catholic church

- Location in Ukraine Pyshchatyntsi (Ukraine)
- Coordinates: 48°47′00″N 25°59′30″E
- Country: Ukraine
- Oblast: Ternopil Oblast
- District: Chortkiv Raion

Population
  - Total: 744
- Time zone: UTC+2 (EET)
  - Summer (DST): UTC+3 (EEST)
- Postal code: 48734

Pyshchatyntsi (Ukrainian: Пищатинці, Polish: Piszczatyńce), a village in Ukraine, is located within Chortkiv Raion of Ternopil Oblast. It belongs to Borshchiv urban hromada, one of the hromadas of Ukraine.
