= Khudiivtsi =

Khudiivtsi Худіївці
- Village
- Location in Ukraine Khudiivtsi (Ukraine)
- Coordinates: 48°41′40″N 26°02′35″E
- Country: Ukraine
- Oblast: Ternopil Oblast
- District: Chortkiv Raion

Population
  - Total: 343
- Time zone: UTC+2 (EET)
  - Summer (DST): UTC+3 (EEST)
- Postal code: 48743

Khudiivtsi (Ukrainian: Худіївці, Polish: Chudyjowce), a village in Ukraine, is located within Chortkiv Raion of Ternopil Oblast. It belongs to Borshchiv urban hromada, one of the hromadas of Ukraine.
