= Priest's Grotto =

Cave in Ukraine

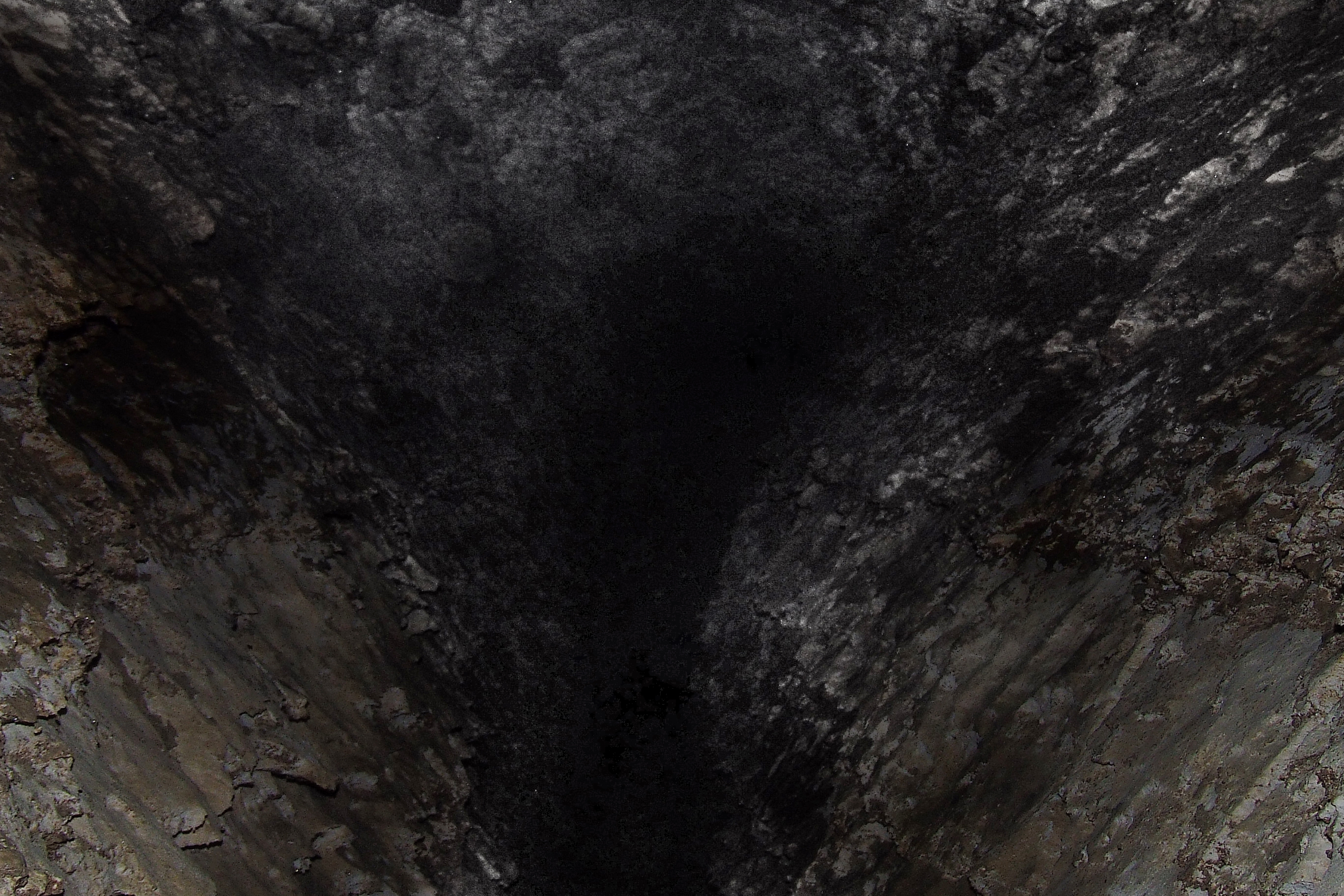
- Priest's Grotto

- Location within Ternopil Oblast Location within Ukraine
- Location: near Strilkivtsi, Chortkiv Raion, Ternopil Oblast, Ukraine
- Coordinates: 48.7644°N 25.96581°E
- Depth: 35 m (115 ft)
- Length: 140.49 km (87.30 mi)
- Discovery: 1940
- Geology: gypsum
- Entrances: 1

Priest's Grotto (Ukrainian: Озерна, lit. 'lake') also known as Ozerna or Blue Lakes Cave, is a cave in western Ukraine near the village of Strilkivtsi, Chortkiv Raion, Ternopil Oblast (Province).

Priest's Grotto is part of the extensive gypsum giant cave system, and is one of the longest caves in the world with over 140.49 kilometres (87.30 mi) (2017) of explored passages. It is about 450 kilometers (280 mi) driving distance southwest of Kyiv, and about 5.5 kilometers (3.4 mi) south of Borshchiv. In World War II it was used as a refuge by Jewish refugees from the Nazi occupation during the Holocaust. It is the 16th longest cave system in the world.

== Holocaust refuge ==
In 1942–1944, during the Nazi occupation, several Jewish families lived in this and the nearby Verteba Cave located 8 kilometres (5.0 mi) to the west in the town of Bilche Zolote. Some of these people never left the cave for 344 days, making this the longest recorded instance of uninterrupted cave habitation known. Although some of the Jews hiding in these caves were caught and murdered by the Nazis, thirty-eight of them managed to survive the Holocaust of Ukrainian Jews until the area was liberated by the Red Army in April 1944.

These people would have almost certainly not survived had they not sought shelter in these caves, since 95% of the Jews in Ukraine were murdered. Moreover, this group included two families, which made their survival all the more remarkable, since only 1% of Ukrainian Jewish families survived the Holocaust intact. At first they hid in the Verteba Cave. However, after the Germans discovered their presence there, they moved to the relatively unknown Priest's Grotto cave, where they managed to survive for the rest of the German occupation of the region. Some of the local Ukrainians helped the Jews by selling them food, but others came close to bringing down their destruction, at one point even attempting an armed assault against the Jewish men who were trying to haul sacks of grain into the entrance of the cave in the middle of the night.

The people in the cave could not afford to illuminate the darkness, but had to conserve candles and fuel. This meant that they only lit candles for a few minutes, several times a day, in order to prepare meals. All other times were spent in complete and total darkness. One of the survivors, Pepkala Blitzer, a four-year-old girl when she and her family sought shelter in the caves from the Nazis, later recalled how she had completely forgotten about the sun or daylight. Eventually, one day in early April 1944, one of the Jewish men found a bottle lying on the floor beneath the entrance to the cave. Inside was a message from a friendly Ukrainian farmer, which read: "The Germans have already gone." A few days later, the entire group of Jews hiding in the cave (numbering 38 people) finally left their refuge. Standing in the bright sunshine, Pepkala asked her mother to put out the bright candle, because it hurt her eyes too much. She was referring to the sun, which she could not remember having seen.

=== Survivors ===
Most of the survivors from Priest's Grotto emigrated to North America, where their descendants still live. Their story was relatively unknown until young American spelunker and former police officer Christos Nicola explored caves in this region. In 1993, he discovered evidence that people had sought refuge in Priest's Grotto cave during World War II. He inquired about this with local residents, which yielded a rumor that "perhaps some Jews had lived in the cave during the War".

After returning to his home in Queens, New York, Nicola spent ten years researching the story until he was able to locate a survivor who lived just a few miles from him in Queens. This led him to meeting with many of the remaining Jewish survivors, and he recorded their experiences.

== Documentary ==
The story of the survivors who lived in these caves was featured in the June/July 2004 issue of the National Geographic Adventure magazine, as well as numerous other journal articles, and an award-winning book published in 2007 that Nicola helped to write, targeted for a young adult audience.

National Geographic staff writer and photographer Peter Lane Taylor, who co-authored The Secret of Priest's Grotto with Nicola, created a production company named Frontier Media Ventures, to help facilitate the making of a documentary, exhibit, and feature film about Nicola and the Priest's Grotto Jews.

No Place on Earth is a documentary/feature film about the Priest's Grotto story, as well as Nicola's investigative work in bringing the story to the public's attention, directed and produced by Janet Tobias, narrated by Nicola and four survivors of the caves. It was released theatrically in the US in 2013 by Magnolia Pictures and in Germany by Senator Films.

== See also ==
- List of longest caves
- The Holocaust in Ukraine
