= Verkhnyakivtsi =

Verkhnyakivtsi Верхняківці
- Village
- Location in Ukraine Verkhnyakivtsi (Ukraine)
- Coordinates: 48°48′47″N 26°00′06″E
- Country: Ukraine
- Oblast: Ternopil Oblast
- District: Chortkiv Raion

Population
  - Total: 688
- Time zone: UTC+2 (EET)
  - Summer (DST): UTC+3 (EEST)
- Postal code: 48763

Verkhnyakivtsi (Ukrainian: Верхняківці, Polish: Wierzchniakowce), a village in Ukraine, is located within Chortkiv Raion of Ternopil Oblast. It belongs to Borshchiv urban hromada, one of the hromadas of Ukraine.
