= Exaltation of the Holy Cross Church, Monastyrok, Ternopil Oblast =

Church in Ternopil Oblast, Ukraine

Exaltation of the Holy Cross Church
- Церква Воздвиження Чесного Хреста Господнього
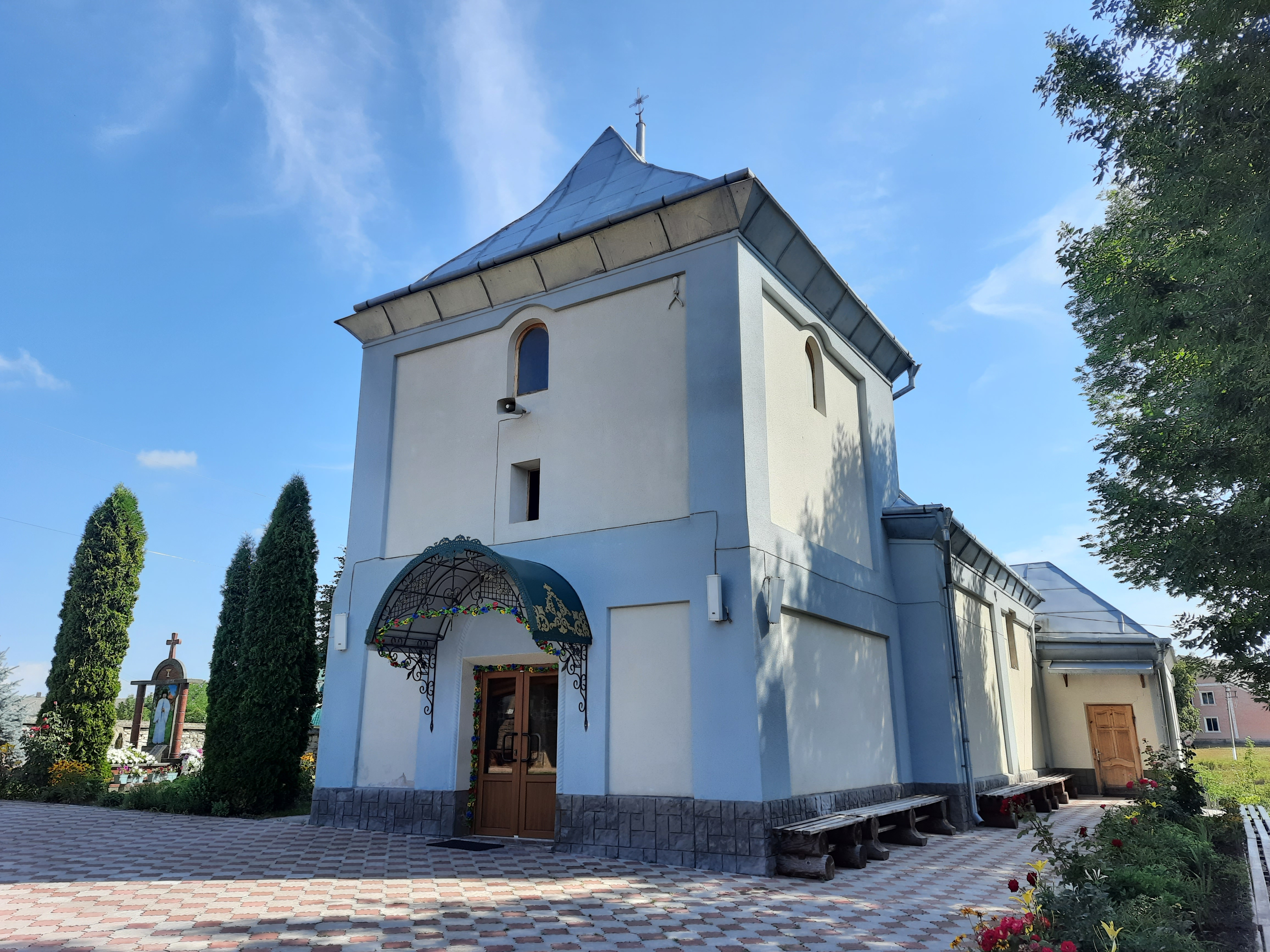

Religion
- Affiliation: Ukrainian Greek Catholic Church

Location
- Location: Monastyrok
- Interactive map of Exaltation of the Holy Cross Church
- Coordinates: 48°43′53″N 25°51′17″E

Immovable Monument of National Significance of Ukraine
- Official name: Здвиженська церква (мур.) (Exaltation Church (stone))
- Type: Architecture
- Reference no.: 190086

Exaltation of the Holy Cross Church (Ukrainian: Церква Воздвиження Чесного Хреста Господнього) is a Greek Catholic parish church (UGCC) in Monastyrok of the Bilche-Zolote rural hromada of the Chortkiv Raion of the Ternopil Oblast, Ukraine, and an architectural monument of national significance.

== History ==
Legends and tales about the Yazhchytska Cave tell us that in the ninth century, local caves were illuminated by Christian monks. They set up cells there, and chose a place for an altar near one wall. They painted God on top of the icon-like relief of the stone. However, the paint was constantly disappearing, no matter how many times it was renewed. Today, the icon has been restored to the wall in the cave.

Next to the small labyrinths of the monastery is a huge stone dolmen, placed on small stones that serve as its "legs". Before major religious festivals, water is poured into a hollow carved in the shape of a cross. Three days later, it and the bottom of the hollow turn the color of blood.

Nearby are the buildings of a monastery dating back to the 16th century. The monks built a small wooden church, which burned down in 1530. A large marble cube, which was used to perform the sacraments in the baptismal chamber, and an icon of the Mother of God remained from the church. In honor of the surviving icon, the church rebuilt in 1560 was named the Church of the Assumption. It is said that about three hundred years ago, a wooden cross appeared nearby, in a cave church, from nowhere. The monks and priests decided to move it to a neighboring village, but a few days later the cross reappeared in Monastyrok. Because of this sign, the church was named in honor of the Exaltation of the Cross. The remains of the cross are still kept in the church as a valuable relic.

There are wooden crosses around the caves. This is a calvary, a Way of the Cross, but not an ordinary one. There are 12 crosses dug into the solid ground, each of which marks not the stages of Christ's ascent to Calvary, but one of the village families, of which there were once twelve. On the eve of the Feast of the Cross, people from Monastyrok come to the village and decorate their cross with greenery. This tradition was inscribed on the National Register of the Intangible Cultural Heritage of Ukraine on 26 March 2026.

In 2010, they bought bells.

== Parsons ==
- Hegumen Feodosii Hlynskyi (2000–2021)
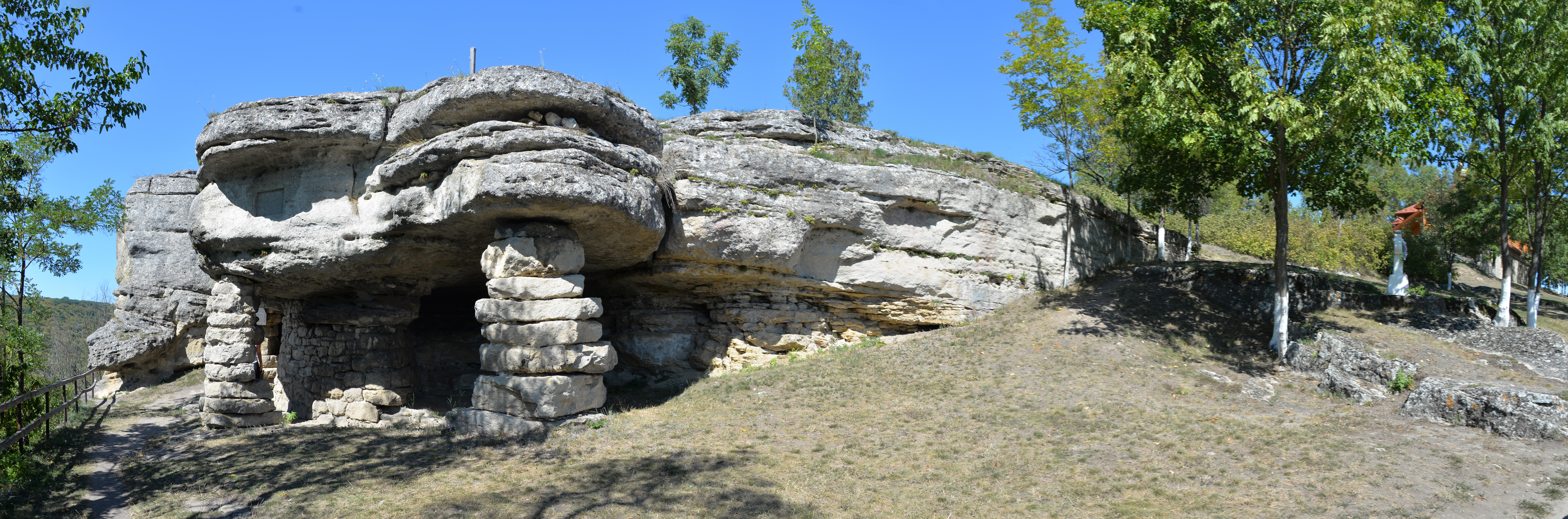
Ancient cave sanctuary

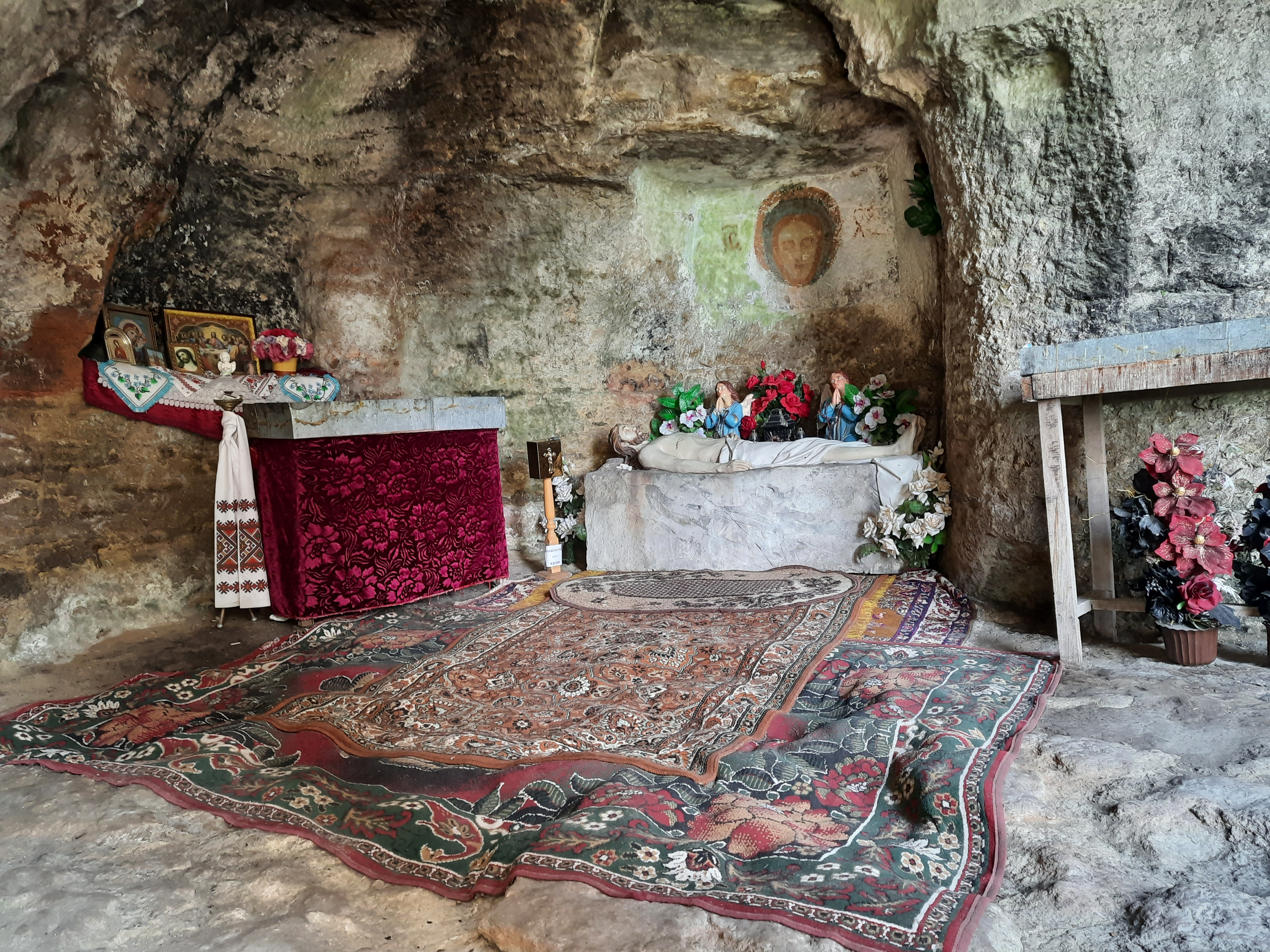
Cave cell
