= Saint Michael Church, Bilche-Zolote =

Church in Ternopil Oblast, Ukraine

Saint Michael Church
- Церква святого архистратига Михаїла
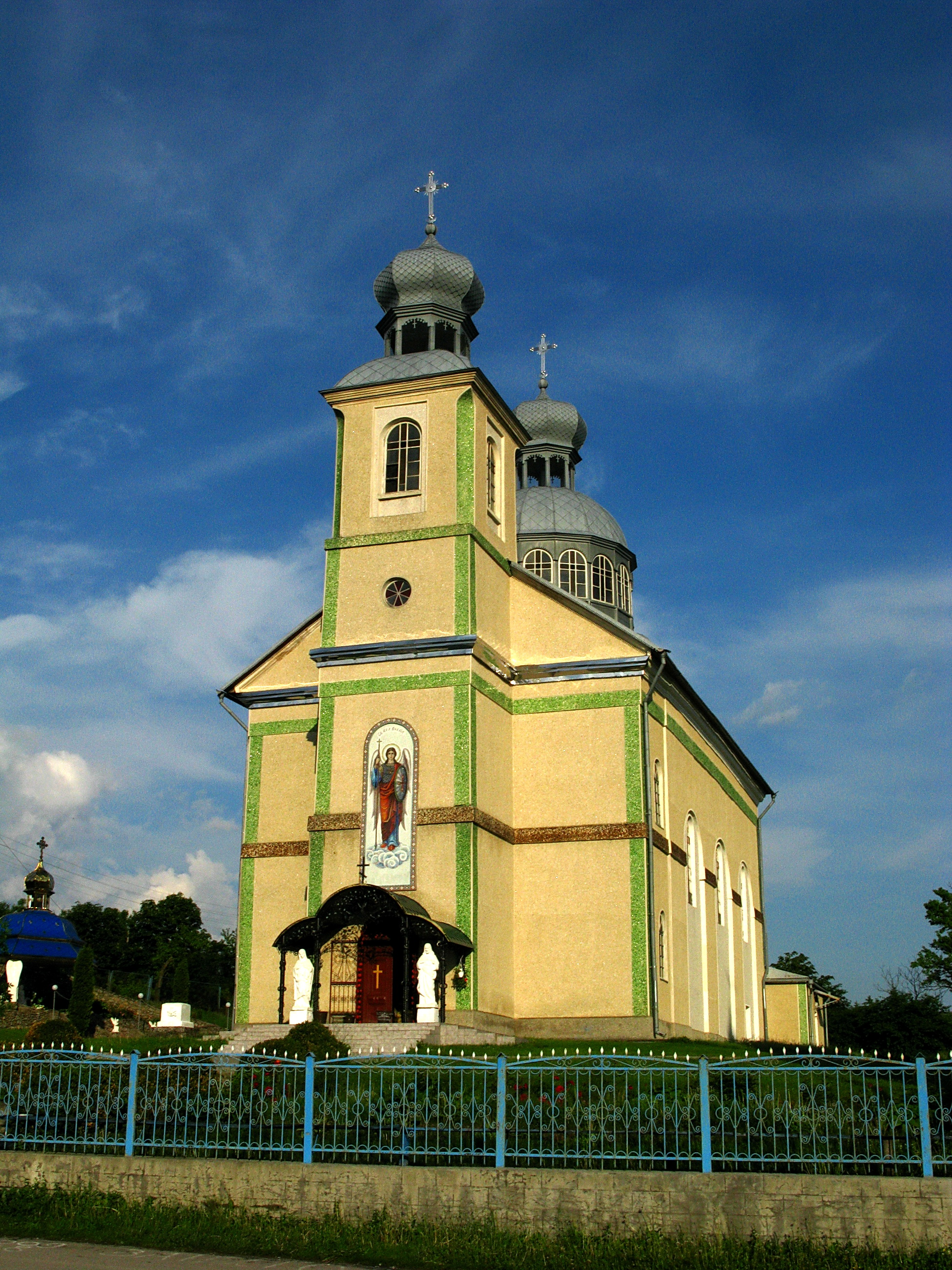

- Location within Ternopil Oblast

Religion
- Affiliation: Orthodox Church of Ukraine

Location
- Location: Bilche-Zolote, Bilche-Zolote rural hromada, Chortkiv Raion, Ternopil Oblast, Ukraine
- Coordinates: 48°46′27.9″N 25°52′22.9″E

Architecture
- Completed: 1871

Saint Michael Church (Ukrainian: Церква святого архистратига Михаїла) is an Orthodox parish church (OCU) in Bilche-Zolote of the Bilche-Zolote rural hromada, Chortkiv Raion, Ternopil Oblast, Ukraine, and an architectural monument of local importance.

== History ==
The church was built with the assistance of Knyaz Sapeha, who in 1868–1871 allocated a place for it in the center of the village. It was built of stone taken from the ruins of the local castle.

The newly built church was painted by the famous iconographer Modest Sosenko. After German bombing during World War II and Soviet management, none of the frescoes survived.

With the blessing of the parish priest Yurii Steblyna, work began on the restoration of the church in 1990. The head of the Peremoha collective farm, V. Chopyk, and the general director of the pig farm, I. Abdulin, provided significant financial assistance. The façade of the church was decorated with the support of the former chief physician of the Bilche-Zolotets sanatorium, V. Vershyhora. In the spring of 1991, artists from the Borshchiv district, led by Vasyl Otetskyi, a native of the Borshchiv Raion, began painting the church.

In 1991, on the feast of the Resurrection of Christ, the brass band of the music school under the direction of Vasyl Mykytchuk played for the first time during the procession. On the joint initiative of at. Yurii Steblyna and the director of the music school, Mykola Teslia, the tradition of a national celebration of the farewell carols was established.

With the blessing of at. Petro Myskiv, they built a chapel of the All-Holy Mother of God for the blessing of water. Together with the priest's wife, they organized a Sunday school for the children of the village. In 2010, with the assistance of philanthropist Volodymyr Ivanyshyn, the bell tower was reconstructed and the roof was re-roofed and the domes were gilded.

== Priests ==
- at. Omelian Hlibovytskyi ([1886], staff member),
- at. Illarion Tyshynskyi,
- at. Vonsul (1904–1906),
- at. Mykola Semenovych (1906–1909),
- at. Sofron Levytskyi (1909–1923),
- at. Mykhailo Hankevych,
- at. Semen Hrebeniuk (1924),
- at. Yurii Steblyna,
- at. Petro Myskiv (since 1992).

== Sources ==
- (in Ukrainian) М. Гавюк, Г. Івахів, Б. Мельничук, Н. Мизак, Більче-Золоте // Ternopil Oblast. History of cities and villages: in 3 v. / Ternopil: "Terno-graph", 2014, V. 1: А—В, S. 469—473. — ISBN 978-966-457-228-3.
