= Oleksyntsi, Ternopil Oblast =

Rural locality in Ternopil Oblast, Ukraine

Oleksyntsi Олексинці
- Village
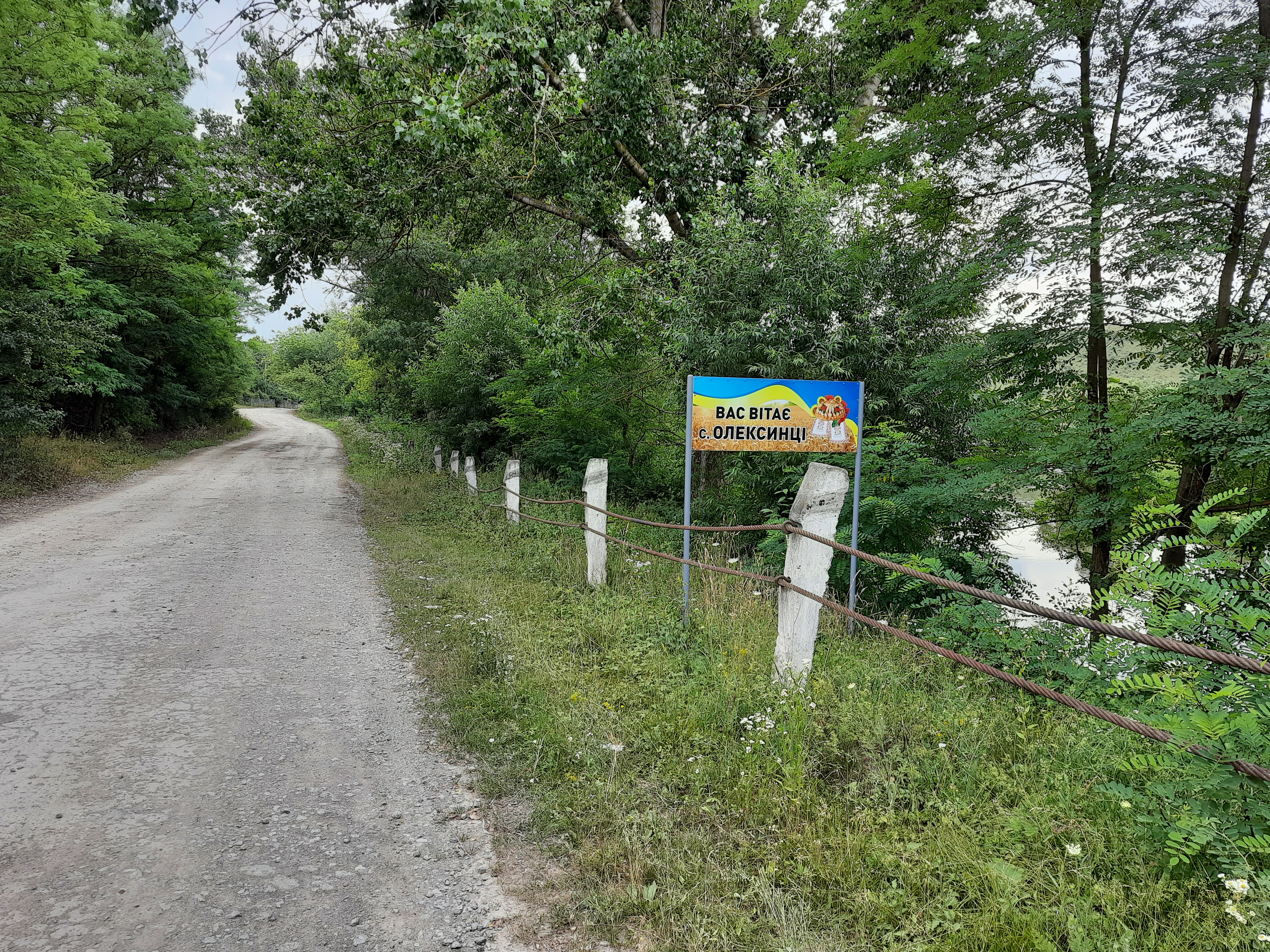
- Welcome sign at the entrance of the village

- Location in Ternopil Oblast
- Coordinates: 48°48′14″N 25°50′37″E
- Country: Ukraine
- Oblast: Ternopil Oblast
- Raion: Chortkiv Raion
- Hromada: Bilche-Zolote rural hromada
- Time zone: UTC+2 (EET)
  - Summer (DST): UTC+3 (EEST)
- Postal code: 48732

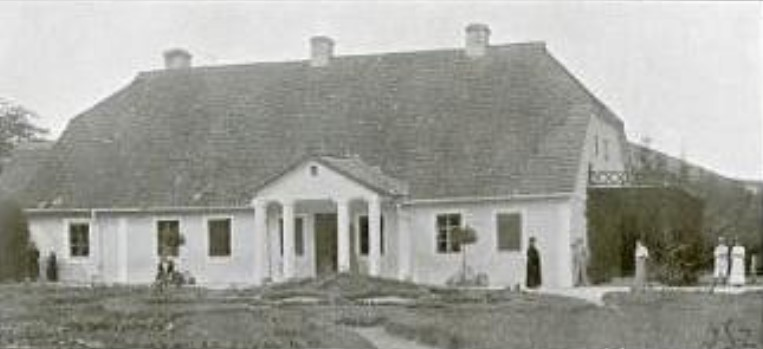

Oleksyntsi (Ukrainian: Олексинці) is a village in Bilche-Zolote rural hromada, Chortkiv Raion, Ternopil Oblast, Ukraine.

Near the village there are Verteba, Oleksynetska, and Mushkarova Yama caves.

== History ==
The first written mention dates from 1448.

After the liquidation of the Borshchiv Raion on 19 July 2020, the village became part of the Chortkiv Raion.

== Religion ==
Two churches of St. Nicholas (1890, OCU; 2004, UGCC).

== Gallery ==
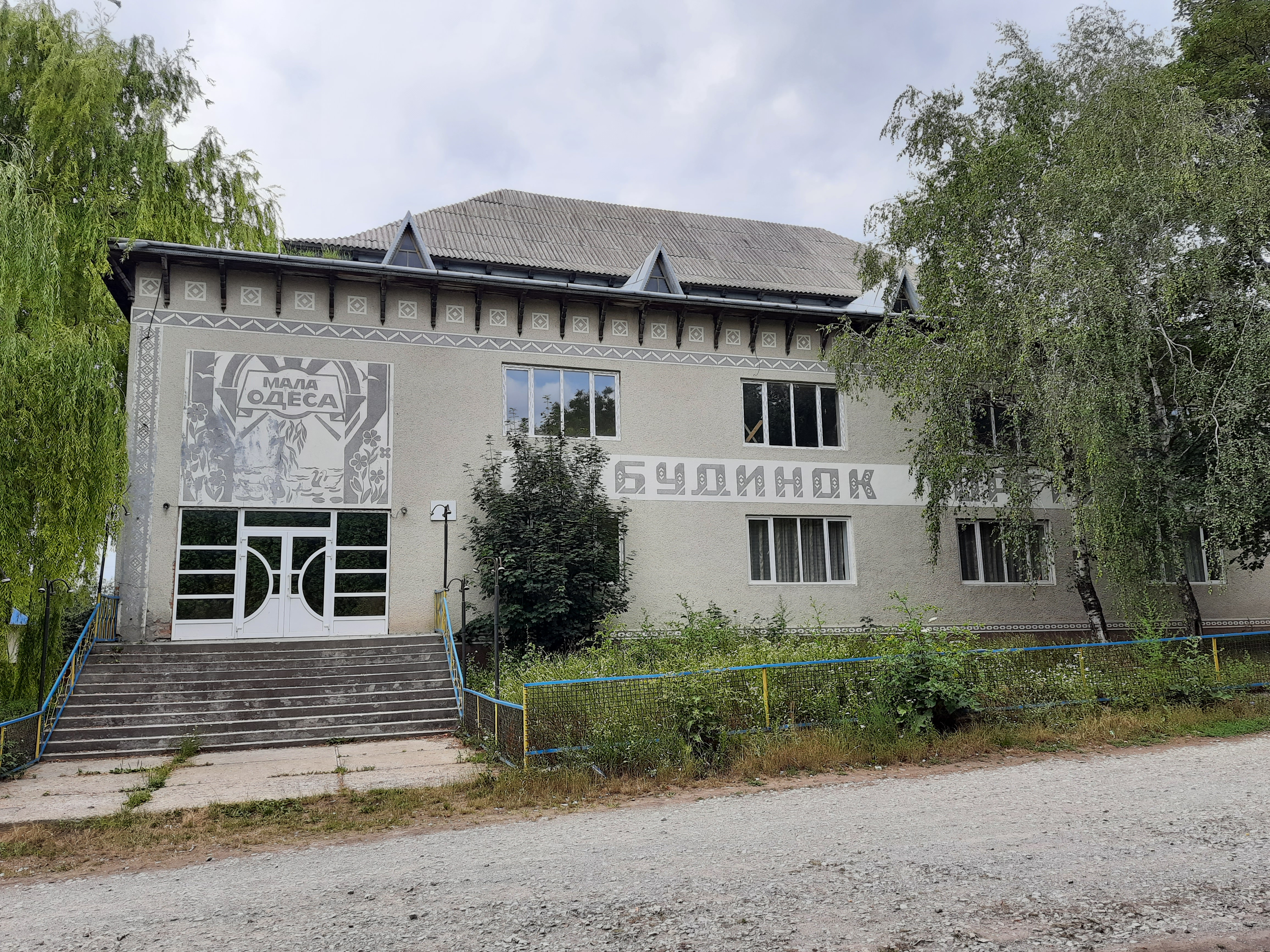
House of Culture

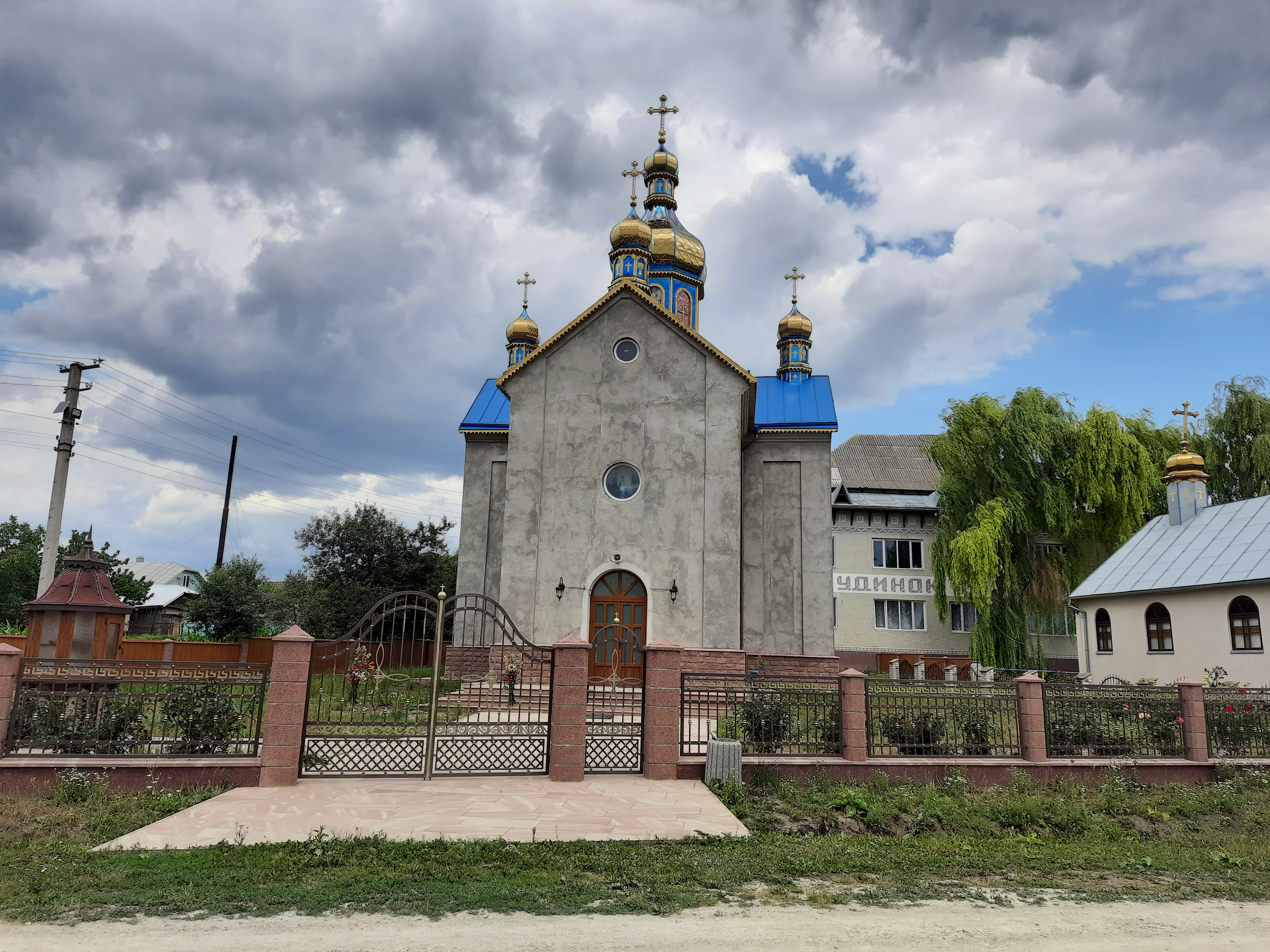
Greek Catholic church

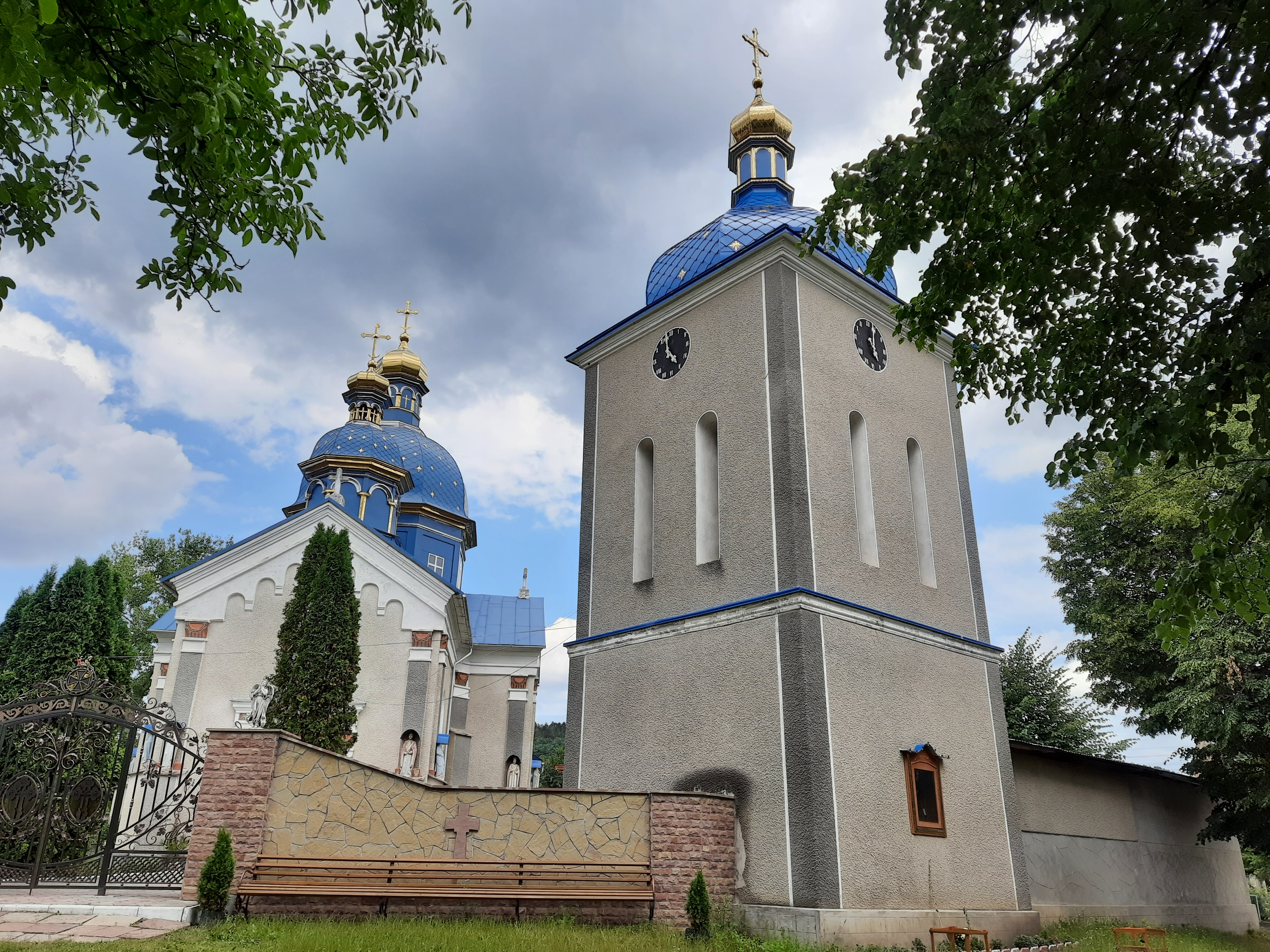
Orthodox church

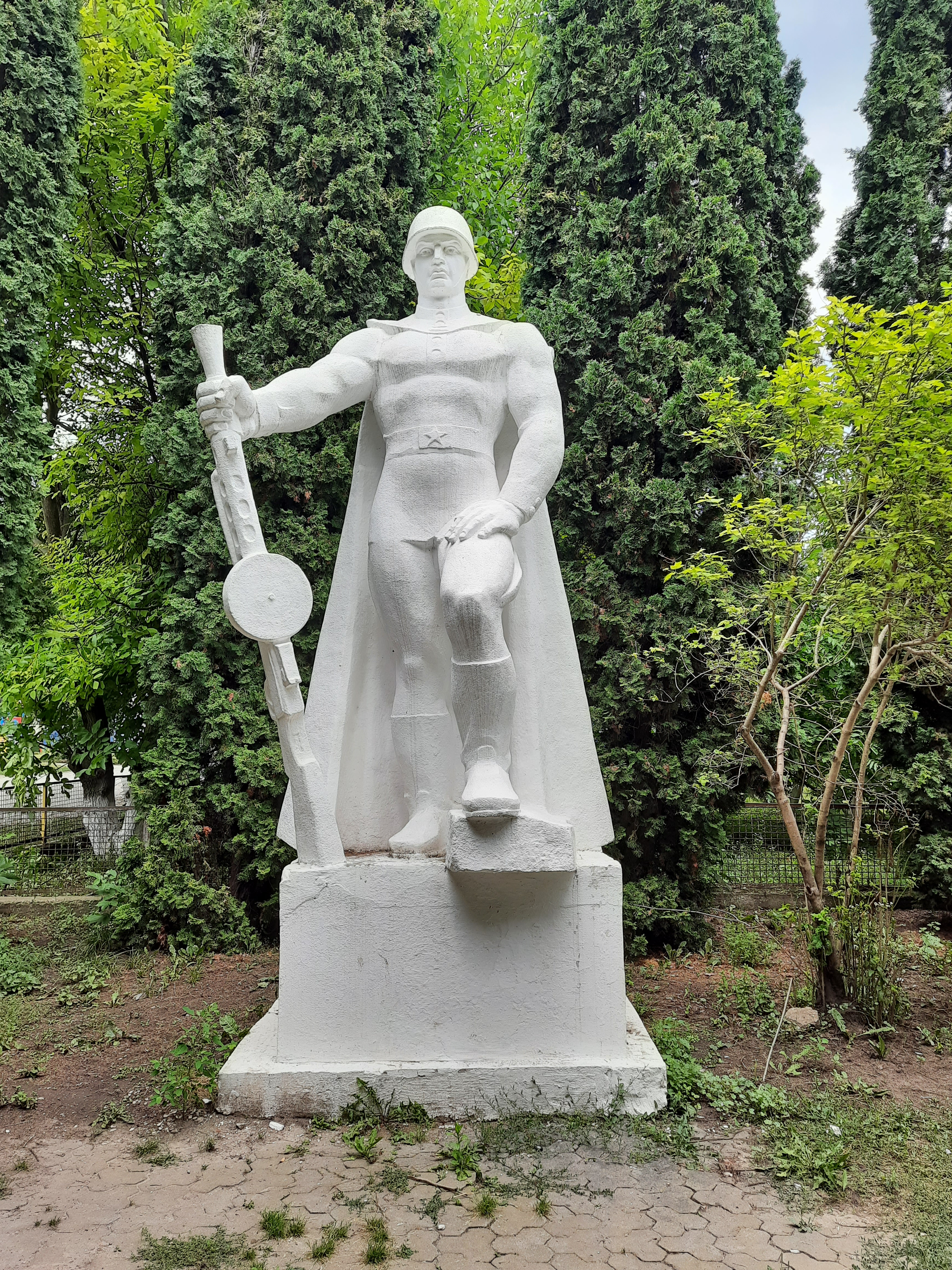
World War II memorial

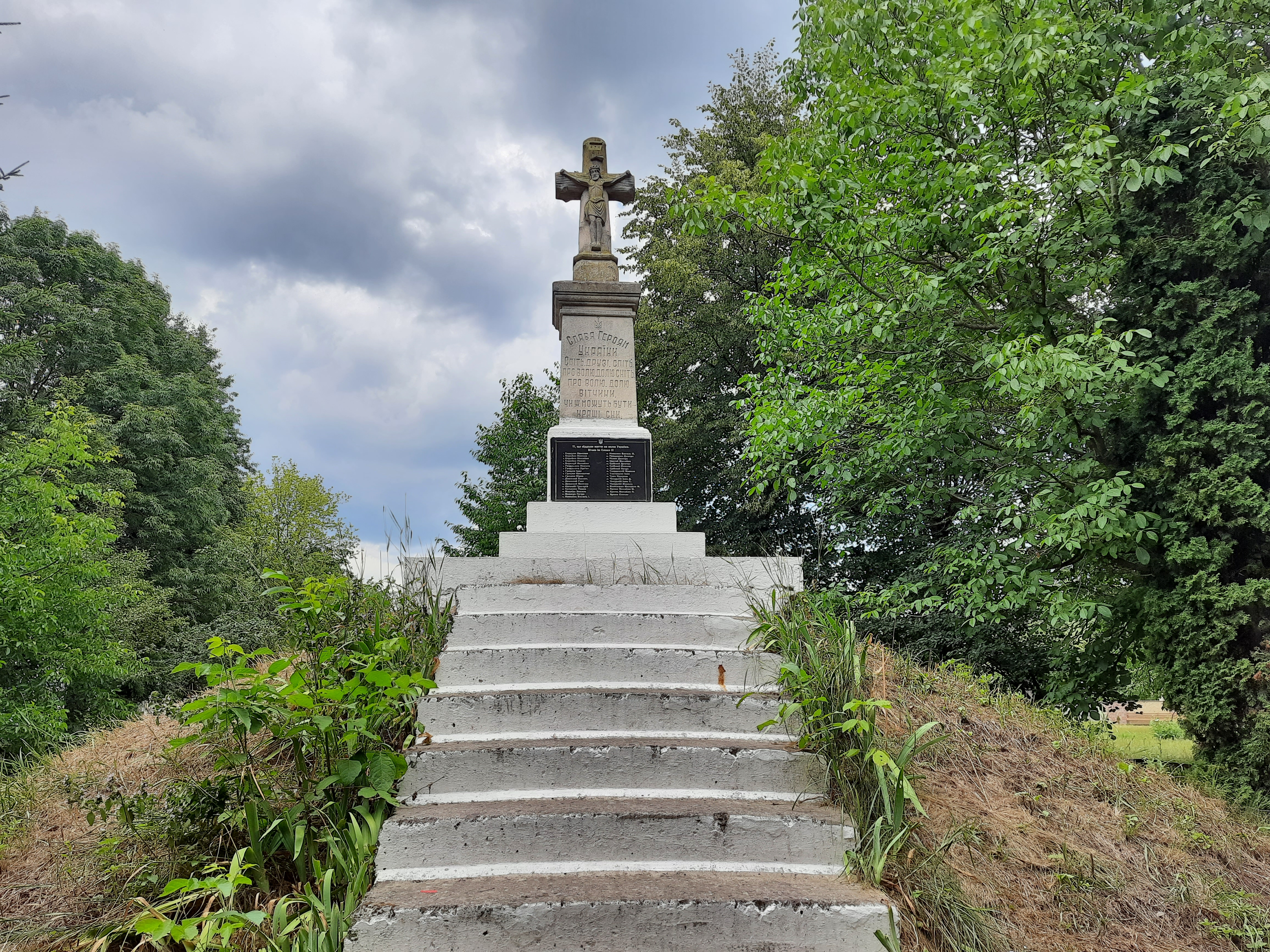
Grave of freedom fighters of Ukraine

== Sources ==
- (in Ukrainian) Клапоущак Н., Уніят, В., Олексинці // Ternopil Encyclopedic Dictionary: in 4 v. / editorial board: H. Yavorskyi and other, Ternopil: "Zbruch", 2005, V. 2: К—О, S. 662. — ISBN 966-528-199-2.
- "Oleksińce". Geographical Dictionary of the Kingdom of Poland (in Polish). 7. Warszawa: Kasa im. Józefa Mianowskiego. 1886. p. 459.
