= Mykhailo Sokhatskyi =

Ukrainian archaeologist, local historian, speleologist, public figure (born 1959)

- Михайло Петрович Сохацький
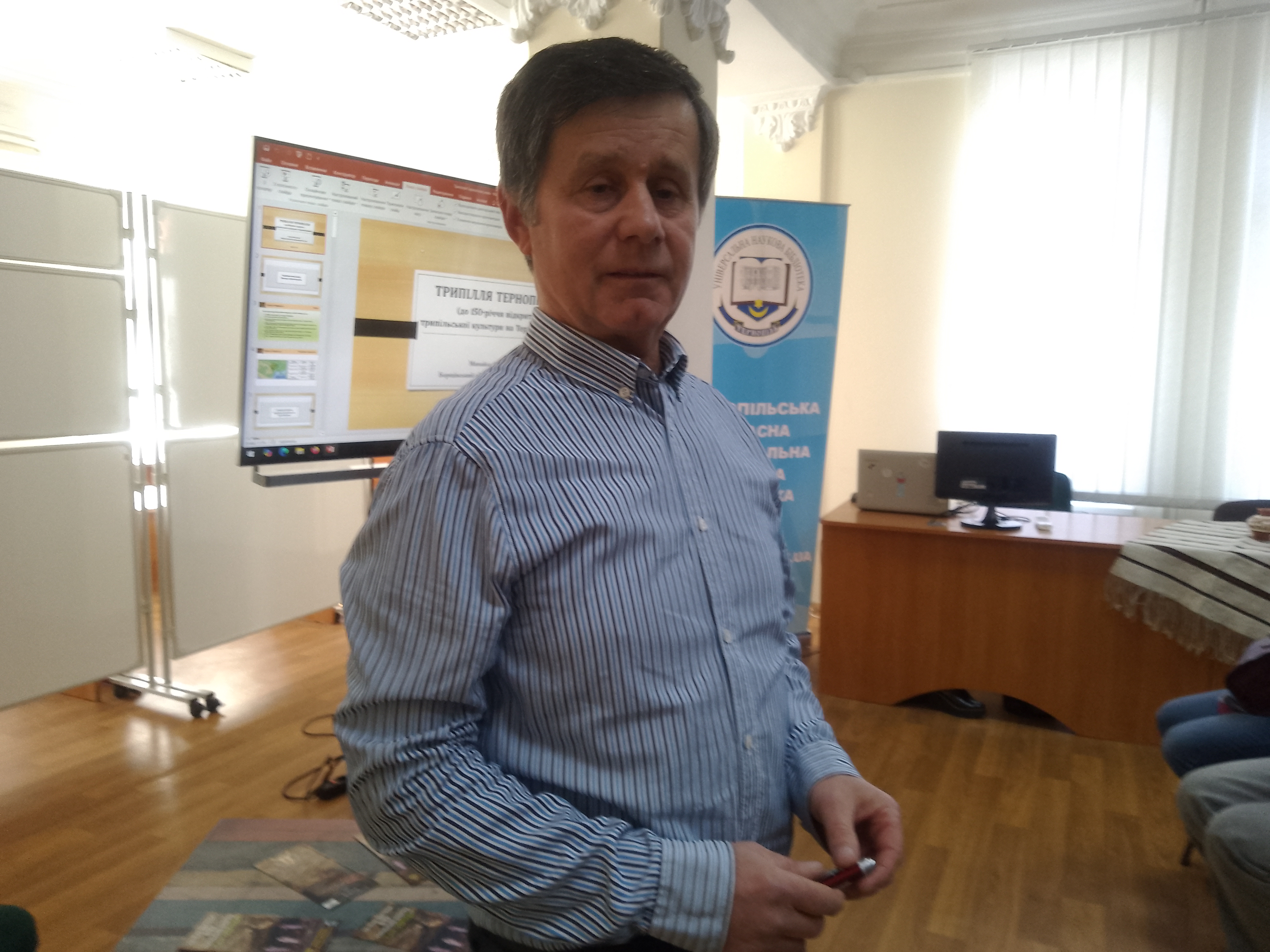
- Born: 26 June 1959 (age 67); Bilche-Zolote, Borshchiv Raion, Ternopil Oblast (now Ukraine)
- Education: Kamianets-Podilskyi Pedagogical Institute
- Occupations: Archaeologist, local historian, speleologist, public figure
- Awards: Merited Culture Worker of Ukraine

Mykhailo Sokhatskyi (Ukrainian: Михайло Петрович Сохацький; 26 June 1959) is a Ukrainian archaeologist, local historian, speleologist, public figure.

In 2002 and 2006, he was a member of the Ternopil Oblast Council. In 1992, he became a member of the National Union of Local History of Ukraine, in 1993 he became a member of the Ukrainian Speleological Association, and in 2000 he became a member of the Shevchenko Scientific Society.

== Biography ==
Mykhailo Sokhatskyi was born on 26 June 1959, in Bilche-Zolote of the Borshchiv Raion, now the Bilche-Zolote rural hromada of the Chortkiv Raion of the Ternopil Oblast of Ukraine.

In 1985 he graduated from the History Department of the Kamianets-Podilskyi Pedagogical Institute. In 1985–1989, he worked as a teacher and deputy director at Hlybochok school in Borshchiv Raion, and from 1989 he has been the director of the Borshchiv Museum. Head of the speleological club at the museum.

=== Research activities ===
From 1991, he has been the head of the archaeological expedition of the National Academy of Sciences of Ukraine, which studies the monuments of Trypillian culture in Podnistrovia. The expedition, led by Mykhailo Sokhatskyi, cooperates with research centers in the United States, the United Kingdom, the University of Tokyo, and the University of Michigan.

In 2007, he opened the Muzeina Cave.

From 1992, he has been co-editor of the scientific and local history collection Litopys Borshichivshchyny.

He is the author of articles based on archaeological excavations published in Ukrainian and foreign publications and scientific collections.

In 2004, on the initiative of Sokhatskyi, an underground Museum of Trypillia Culture in Verteba near the village of Bilche-Zolote (the only one in the world).

From 1992, he has been the head of the raion local history society "Dzherelo".

Participant of scientific conferences in Ukraine and abroad.

== Awards ==
- Merited Culture Worker of Ukraine (2006)
- Acknowledgment of the Cabinet of Ministers of Ukraine (2004)
- Diploma of the Ministry of Culture of Ukraine "The Best Director of a Museum of Regional Subordination" (2004)
- Volodymyr Hnatiuk Award (2011)
- President of Ukraine's award – Jubilee Medal "25 Years of Independence of Ukraine" (2016)

== Bibliography ==
- Галич У. Таємниці археології // Вільне життя плюс. — 2024. — № 98 (6 груд.). — С. 1. — (Вісті з громад).
- Новосядлий Б. Кришталеве диво Борщівського краю // Свобода. — 2013. — № 70 (30 серп.). — С. 5.
- Мадзій І. Центр трипільської культури — Тернопілля // Вільне життя плюс. — 2012. — № 90 (14 листоп.). — С. 7.
