= Bilche-Zolote =

Bilche-Zolote Більче-Золоте Bilcze Złote
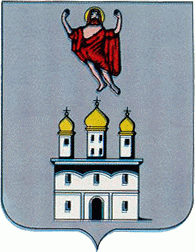
- Coat of arms

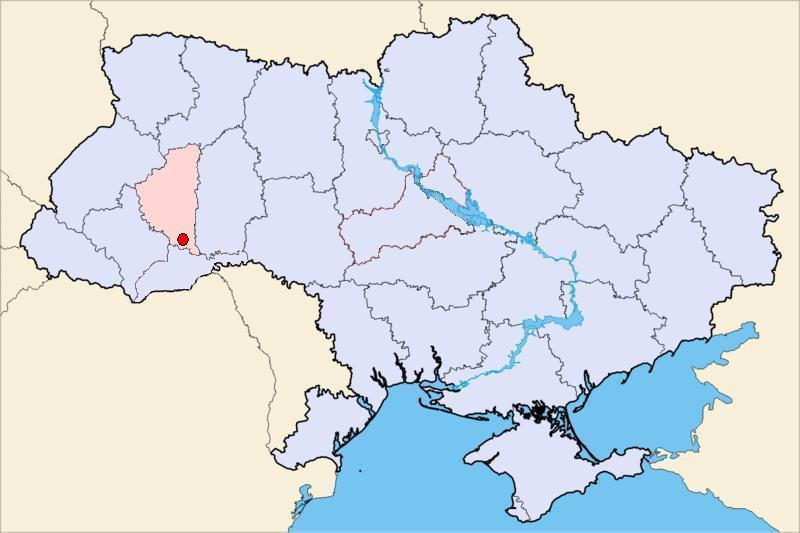
- Map of Ukraine with Bilche-Zolote highlighted.

- Location of Bilche-Zolote Bilche-Zolote (Ukraine)
- Coordinates: 48°46′21″N 25°52′51″E
- Country Oblast Raion: Ukraine; Ternopil Oblast; Chortkiv Raion

Area
  - Total: 5.993 km^{2} (2.314 sq mi)
- Elevation: 193 m (633 ft)

Population (2001)
  - Total: 2,002
  - Density: 334/km^{2} (870/sq mi)
- Time zone: UTC+2 (EET-->)
  - Summer (DST): UTC+3 (EEST-->)
- Postal code: 48733
- Area code: +380 47
- ISO 3166 code: UA-26

Bilche-Zolote (Ukrainian: Більче-Золоте Bil'che Zolote; Polish: Bilcze Złote; Hebrew: בילצ'ה זלוטה, romanized: Vilche Zlote) is a Ukrainian village located within the Chortkiv Raion (district) of the Ternopil Oblast (province), about 460 kilometers (290 mi) driving distance southwest of Kyiv. It hosts the administration of Bilche-Zolote rural hromada, one of the hromadas of Ukraine. This rural community is located in a small valley adjacent to the Seret River, which is surrounded by plateaus covered with farms, broken by occasional stands of mixed forest. Bilche-Zolote is home to a remarkable park of 1,800 hectares (4,400 acres), of which 11 hectares (27 acres) is covered with virgin timber, including some trees up to 400 years old. Bilche-Zolote is also the location of the large gypsum karst Verteba Cave, as well as a significant Neolithic Cucuteni-Trypillian culture archaeological site, and attracts tourist and spelunker visitors from many countries.

== History ==
Founded in the early 10th century, Bilche-Zolote has been ruled at various times by the Kievan Rus', Lithuania, Austria, Russia, Poland, the Soviet Union, Germany, Carpatho-Ukraine, and Ukraine. Its town council, which oversees the governance of the area, also administers the villages of Yuriampil (Ukrainian: Юр'ямпіль), Monastyrok (Ukrainian: Монастирок), and Mushkativ (Ukrainian: Мушкатів). The nearest railway station is 12 km (7.5 mi) away in the town of Ozeryany (Ukrainian: Озеряни). The town includes public elementary through secondary schools, a public library, two recreational facilities, and an Inter-Regional Rehabilitation Hospital.

Until 18 July 2020, Bilche-Zolote belonged to Borshchiv Raion. The raion was abolished in July 2020 as part of the administrative reform of Ukraine, which reduced the number of raions of Ternopil Oblast to three. The area of Borshchiv Raion was merged into Chortkiv Raion.

== Bilche-Zolote Landscape Park ==
Founded in the early 19th century, the Bilche-Zolote Landscape Park included part of the estate and the palace of a local aristocrat family.

On 29 January 1960, the Ukraine Council of Ministers passed a resolution to include the Bilche-Zolote Landscape Park within the Ukrainian Natural Reserve Fund.

== Verteba and Priest's Grotto Caves ==
The Verteba Cave (Ukrainian: Вертеба) located on the outskirts of Bilche-Zolote village gets its name from the Ukrainian word for "crib" (Ukrainian: вертеп, vertel). Verteba is one of the largest caves in Europe, measuring 7.8 kilometers (4.8 mi) in length, with a total of 6000 cubic meters. It consists of maze-like passageways, often separated by thin walls, as well as broad galleries. The walls of the cave are smooth and dark, with rare incrustations of calcium carbonate appearing. There are also small stalactites, and unusual stalagmites that have the appearance of barrels, all of which are coated in an opaque watery liquid known as moonmilk.

== Cucuteni-Trypillian settlement ==
During a mundane excavation on the Sapyehy estate in 1884, workers stumbled upon the buried ruins of a prehistoric settlement near the mouth of the Verteba cave. Over the years, more than 300 intact ceramic containers have been unearthed from the floor of the cave and this Neolithic era settlement, which encompasses a total of 8 hectares (20 acres). Archaeologists identified the artifacts as belonging to the Cucuteni-Trypillian culture, with evidence of two separate periods of settlement activity dating from 4440 to 4100 B.C. and 3800-3300 B.C. The members of this society plowed their farms, raised livestock, hunted and fished, created textiles, and developed a beautiful and highly refined style of pottery with very intricate designs. Their settlements, which with up to 15,000 inhabitants were among the largest on earth at the time, were built in oval or circular layouts, with concentric rows of houses that were interconnected to form rings around the center of the community, where often a sanctuary building would be found. They left behind a large number of clay figurines, many of which are regarded as Mother goddess fetishes. For over 2500 years the culture flourished with no evidence left behind that would indicate they experienced warfare. However, at the beginning of the Bronze Age their culture disappeared, the reasons for which are still debated, but possibly as a result of invaders coming from the Steppes to the east.

Over the years there have been a number of major archaeological explorations of this site, starting with excavations from 1889 to 1891 by Edward Pawłowicz and Gotfryd Ossowski. In 1898 Włodzimierz Demetrykiewicz conducted an excavation and analysis. In 1952 and 1956 V. N. Eravets, I. E. Svyshnikov, and G. M. Vlasova resumed the exploration of the site, which had been neglected during the turbulent first half of the 20th century. Recently, in 2000, M. Sohatskyy conducted further excavations of the site. The evidence from the discoveries revealed that there had been a gap between when the settlement was occupied. The more recent settlement yielded ceramic finds that connected it to the Shypynetsk group (Ukrainian: шипинецької групи), a sub-group of the Cucuteni-Trypillian culture that flourished in this region during the later Neolithic.

Along with the intact ceramic containers unearthed in the cave, archaeologists have also found more than 35,000 clay fragments, including many of the famous Cucuteni-Trypillian goddess figurines, 200 pieces of bone and antler remains, and an additional 300 tools and other objects crafted from bone and stone, including flint implements, bone awls, and a few small copper artifacts. Archaeologists discovered one of the few burial sites of the Cucuteni-Trypillian culture at this site, amounting to almost 120 individuals. One of the most famous artifacts from the Cucuteni-Trypillian culture was found at Bilche-Zolote by the first team of archaeologists in the 1890s: a bone plate from about 3500 B.C. was found inside the Verteba cave, which was incised with a silhouette of a Mother goddess, and which became one of the most recognized symbols of this culture.

Beginning in 1907, a collection of the archaeological finds from the Bilche-Zolote Cucuteni-Trypillian settlement made up the core collection of the local archaeological museum, which was housed in the palace located on the grounds of the Landscape Park. During the period of Polish occupation, these materials were removed to the Museum of Archeology in Krakow. More recent finds from archaeological excavations have been housed in the Lviv Historical Museum and the Borshchiv Regional Museum of Local Lore.

== Religion ==
- St. Michael Church (1871, OCU, brick)
- St. Paraskeva Church (1899, UGCC, brick)

== Notable people ==
- Ivan Verkhratskyi (1846-1919), Ukrainian scientist and pedagogue, member of Shevchenko Scientific Society
- Mykhailo Sokhatskyi (born 1959), Ukrainian archaeologist, local historian, speleologist, public figure

== See also ==
- Neolithic Europe
- Chalcolithic Europe
- Prehistory of Southeastern Europe
- History of Ukraine
- The Holocaust in Ukraine

Related articles appearing in the Ukrainian language Wikipedia for which no English Wikipedia article exists:

- Verteba Cave
- Borshchiv Oblast Museum which houses some of the archaeological finds from this area.
- Bilche-Zolote Trypillian culture

== Sources ==
- (in Ukrainian) М. Гавюк, Г. Івахів, Б. Мельничук, Н. Мизак, Більче-Золоте // Ternopil Oblast. History of cities and villages: in 3 v. / Ternopil: "Terno-graph", 2014, V. 1: А—В, S. 469—473. — ISBN 978-966-457-228-3.
