= Mushkariv =

Rural locality in Ternopil Oblast, Ukraine

Mushkariv Мушкарів
- Location in Ternopil Oblast
- Coordinates: 48°47′15″N 25°49′46″E
- Country: Ukraine
- Oblast: Ternopil Oblast
- Raion: Chortkiv Raion
- Hromada: Bilche-Zolote Hromada
- Time zone: UTC+2 (EET)
  - Summer (DST): UTC+3 (EEST)
- Postal code: 48733

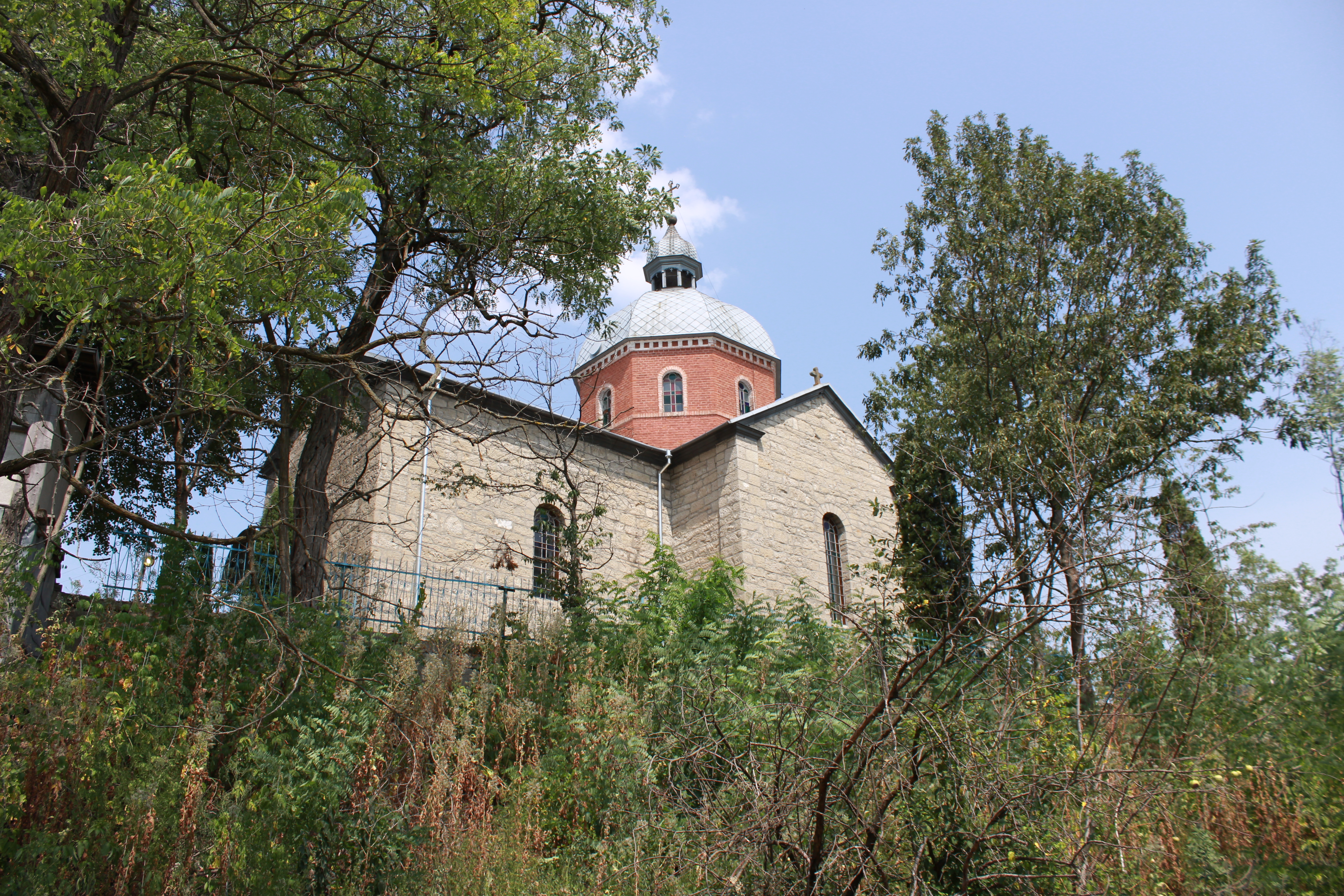
Church of the Assumption, village of Mushkariv, Ukraine

Mushkariv (Ukrainian: Мушкарів) is a village in Bilche-Zolote rural hromada, Chortkiv Raion, Ternopil Oblast, Ukraine.

== History ==
The first written mention dates from 1577.

After the liquidation of the Borshchiv Raion on 19 July 2020, the village became part of the Chortkiv Raion.

== Religion ==
- Church of the Assumption (1912, brick, OCU)
- chapel

== Sources ==
- (in Ukrainian) Гавюк М., Клапоущак, Н., Мушкарів // Ternopil Encyclopedic Dictionary: in 4 v. / editorial board: H. Yavorskyi and other, Ternopil: "Zbruch", 2005, V. 2: К—О, S. 582. — ISBN 966-528-199-2.
- "Muszkarów". Geographical Dictionary of the Kingdom of Poland (in Polish). 6. Warszawa: Kasa im. Józefa Mianowskiego. 1885. p. 816.
