= Monastyrok, Ternopil Oblast =

Rural locality in Ternopil Oblast, Ukraine

Monastyrok Монастирок
- Village
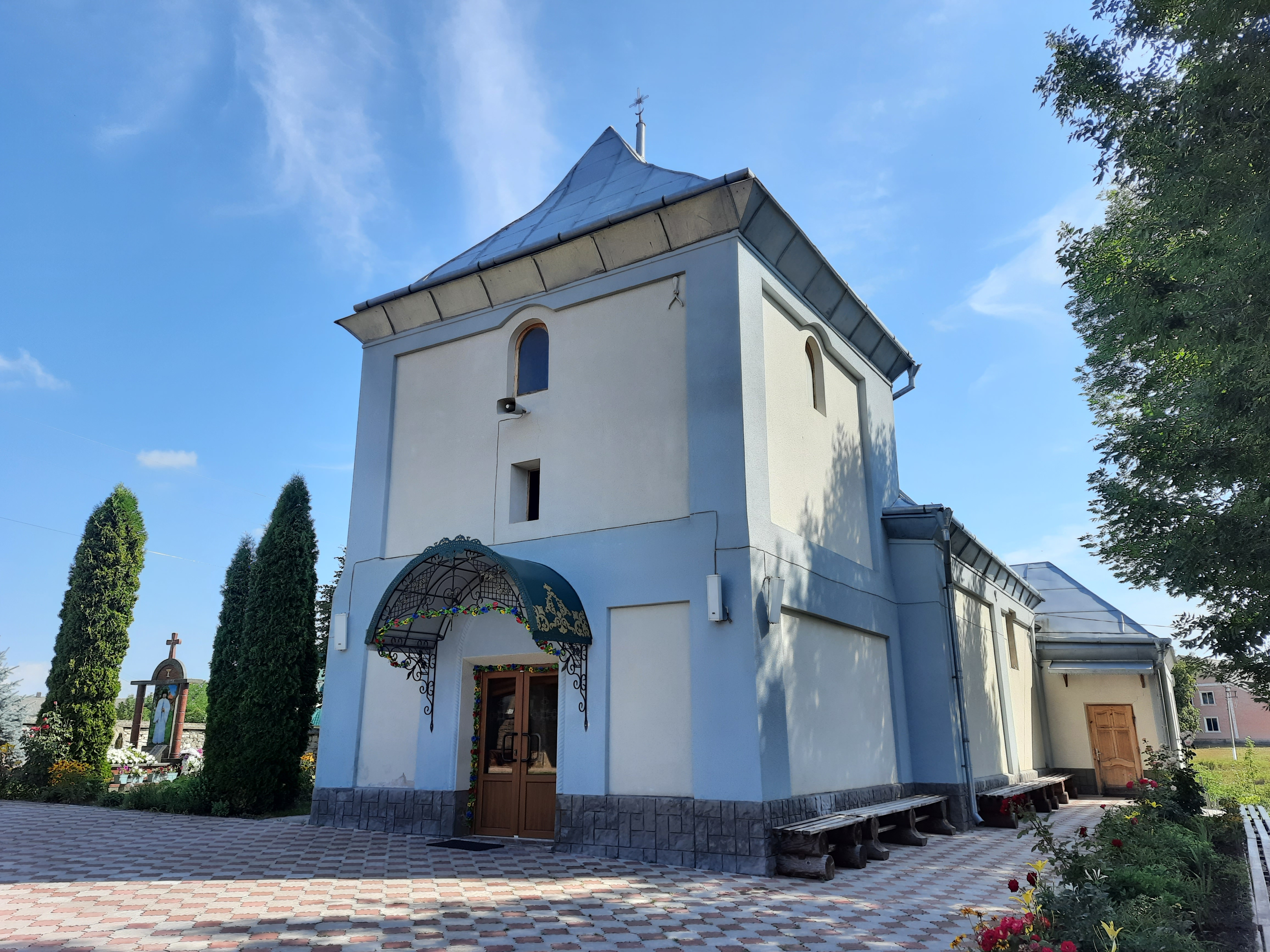
- Exaltation of the Holy Cross church

- Location in Ternopil Oblast
- Coordinates: 48°43′56″N 25°51′30″E
- Country: Ukraine
- Oblast: Ternopil Oblast
- Raion: Chortkiv Raion
- Hromada: Bilche-Zolote rural hromada
- Time zone: UTC+2 (EET)
  - Summer (DST): UTC+3 (EEST)
- Postal code: 48733

Monastyrok (Ukrainian: Монастирок) is a village in Bilche-Zolote rural hromada, Chortkiv Raion, Ternopil Oblast, Ukraine.

== History ==
The first written mention is from 1600.

== Religion ==
- Exaltation of the Holy Cross Church (18th century, which houses a miraculous icon of the Mother of God)
- Yazychnytska Cave (a cave-temple of the pre-Christian period, length – 28 m, area – 50 sq. m., a natural monument of local importance), near which there is a pagan altar – Dovbush's stone (the remains of a monastery and a chapel – "Sviatynia yazychnykiv" with niches carved in the rock, where traces of ancient inscriptions remain, here the image of Jesus Christ is constantly displayed on the wall)
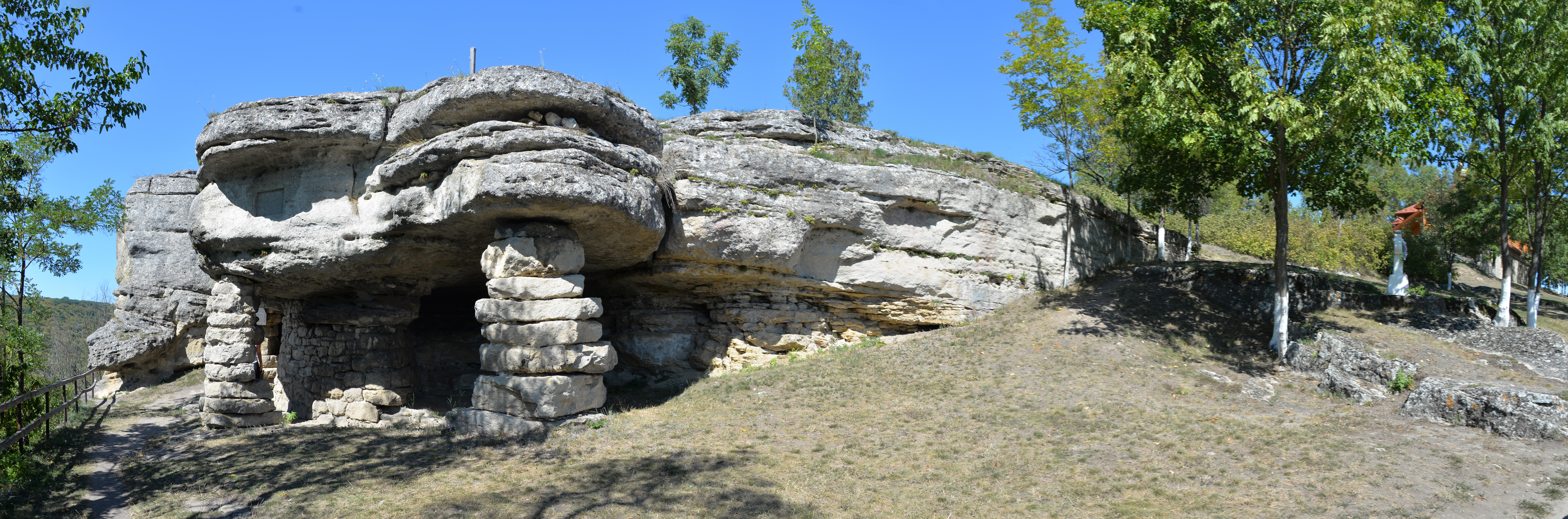
Ancient cave sanctuary

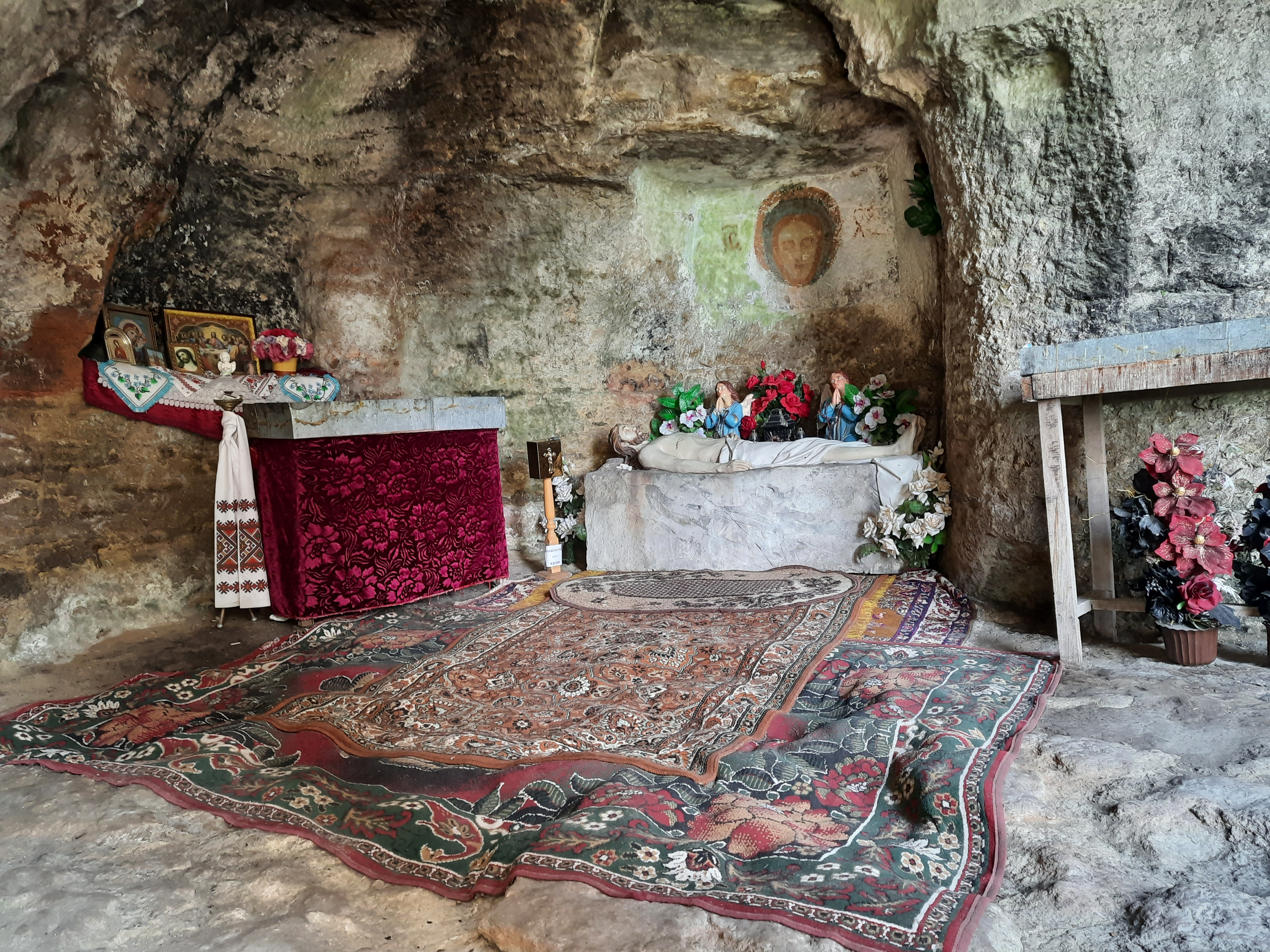
Cave cell
