= Ivan Verkhratskyi =

Ukrainian-Galician natural scientist and teacher (1846–1919)

Ivan Hryhorovych Verkhratskyi
- Іва́н Григо́рович Верхра́тський
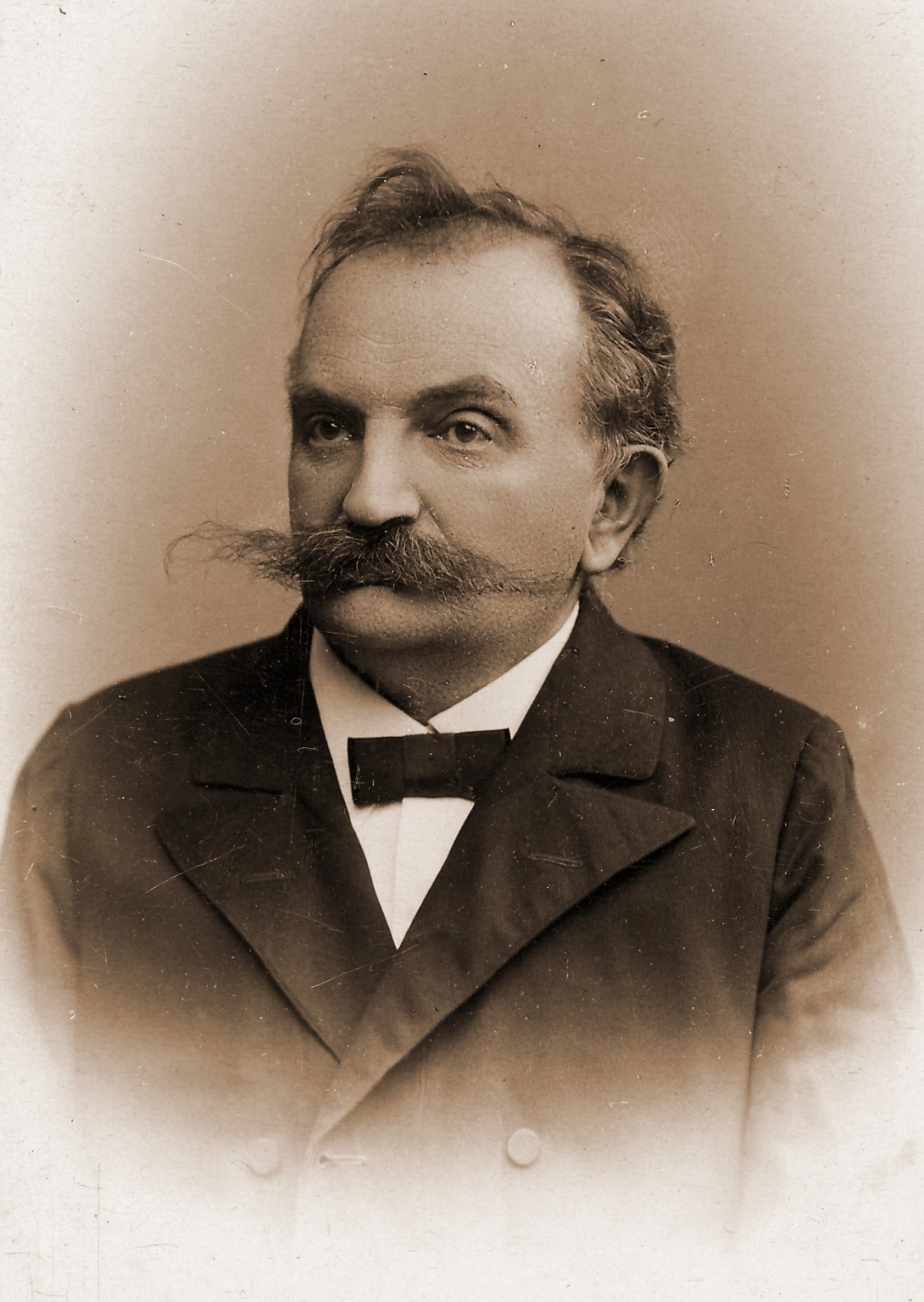
- Verkhratskyi from a portrait made before 1919.
- Born: April 24, 1846; Bilche-Zolote, Kingdom of Galicia and Lodomeria, Austrian Empire
- Died: November 29, 1919 (aged 73); Lviv, Lwów Voivodeship, Second Polish Republic
- Resting place: Lychakiv Cemetery; 49.833°N 24.056°E
- Education: Lviv University
- Alma mater: Saint Petersburg State University
- Scientific career
- Fields: Botany; Zoology; Linguism
- Institutions: Drohobych State Gymnasium named after Franz Joseph I
- Notable students: Ivan Franko

Ivan Verkhratskyi (24 April 1846 – 29 November 1919) was a Ukrainian-Galician natural scientist, linguist, and teacher. His most famous scientific works were creating multiple volumes of local plant names in Ukraine, which is still the largest of its kind, and creating the foundational textbooks for zoology and botany in Ukrainian gymnasiums.

Born in Bilche-Zolote, then part of the Austrian Empire, Verkhratskyi first entered the natural sciences department at Lviv University where he graduated from in 1868. He would then take on various teaching positions, while also doing his own research and writing. He taught at the Drohobych State Gymnasium named after Franz Joseph I, where he became an early influence to Ivan Franko, in Lviv at a real school, gymnasiums in Riashev, Stanislav, and the Academic Gymnasium of Lviv. In 1874 he completed his qualification in zoology also. During his time teaching, he was involved extensively in dialectology in the Ukrainian area of the Austro-Hungarian Empire and also documented a collection of insects, particularly butterflies. After retiring as a teacher in 1908, he died in 1919.

== Early life ==
Verkhratskyi was born on 24 April 1846 in the village of Bilche-Zolote, which was then part of the Kingdom of Galicia and Lodomeria in the Austrian Empire at the time of his birth. His father was a priest named Hryhorii, while his mother was a Croatian-German woman. Two years after his birth, in 1848, his father died, leaving his mother to take care of Verkhratskyi and his three other siblings alone, and so they eventually moved to Lviv where he entered a gymnasium. In 1865 he entered the natural sciences department of the Faculty of Philosophy at Lviv University, where he graduating from in 1868.

== Career ==
In 1868 he became a junior teacher at the Drohobych State Gymnasium named after Franz Joseph I, teaching languages (German and Ukrainian) and natural history. In the same year he started teaching he attempted to create an education society in Drohobych in the vain of "Prosvita" in Lviv, but it failed because of a powerful Galician Russophilia sentiment at the time of its would be creation. There he taught Ivan Franko, where he encouraged him and would go on frequent trips with him. Writing later on, Franko stated, "two teachers had an influence on the development of my literary taste: Ivan Verkhratsky and Yuliy Turchynsky. I read everything I could get from Verkhratsky, with whom I went on several nature excursions." He also organized a literary circle in the gymnasium which included Franko. Proclaiming his ideas soon after, he wrote that the foundations of a literary language should be inspired by folklore.

In late 1871 he moved from Drohobych and Franz Joseph to Lviv to work at a real school until 1874. During his time as a teacher in Lviv, he completed his qualification in zoology in Kraków at Jagiellonian University in 1874. From 1874 to 1879 he then taught at the gymnasium in Riashev. During his final year in Raishev, in 1878, he carried out an ethnographic expedition to the north and south of Ukraine to carry out linguistic research as part of his mission to improve the state of the Ukrainian language. In 1879 he started working as a senior teacher at a gymansium in Stanislav. In 1880 he started writing for the literary magazine "Dennitsa" while working at the school in Stanislav.

In 1890 he again moved to Lviv, and he started working at the Academic Gymnasium of Lviv in September 1891. At the academic gymnasium, he helped found the natural science cabinet and the NTSh (Shevchenko Scientific Society) Ethnographic Museum. In 1908 he retired and stopped working at the academic gymnasium.

=== Works ===
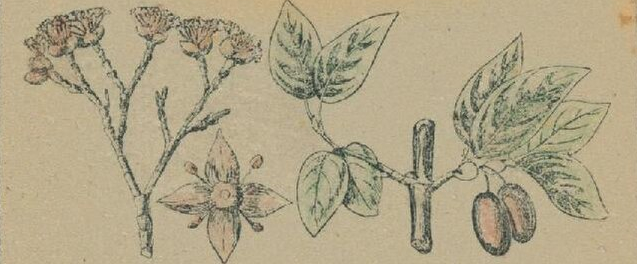
An illustration for one of Verkhratskyi's textbooks for high-schoolers, re-published in 1922

Verkhratskyi extensively studied dialectology, writing a lexicology on Southern Russian, and doing works on the dialects of Rusyns in Hungary and Lemkos. He also created multiple volumes of work in 1908 about local plant names in the Ukrainian area of the Austro-Hungarian Empire, Polissia, and the Black Sea area, which is still the largest of its kind. In addition, he created textbooks for gymnasiums in zoology and botany, which were the first for Ukrainian high schools.

During the late 19th century to early 20th century, he went in various area in Galicia, Bukovina, and Transcarpathia and created a collection of over five thousand insects, primarily butterflies. In 1905 the collection was transferred to the museum of the Shevchenko Scientific Society and in 1940 to the State Museum of Natural History, where it was put off display until 2023 when it was agreed to digitize the museum's holdings.

== Death ==
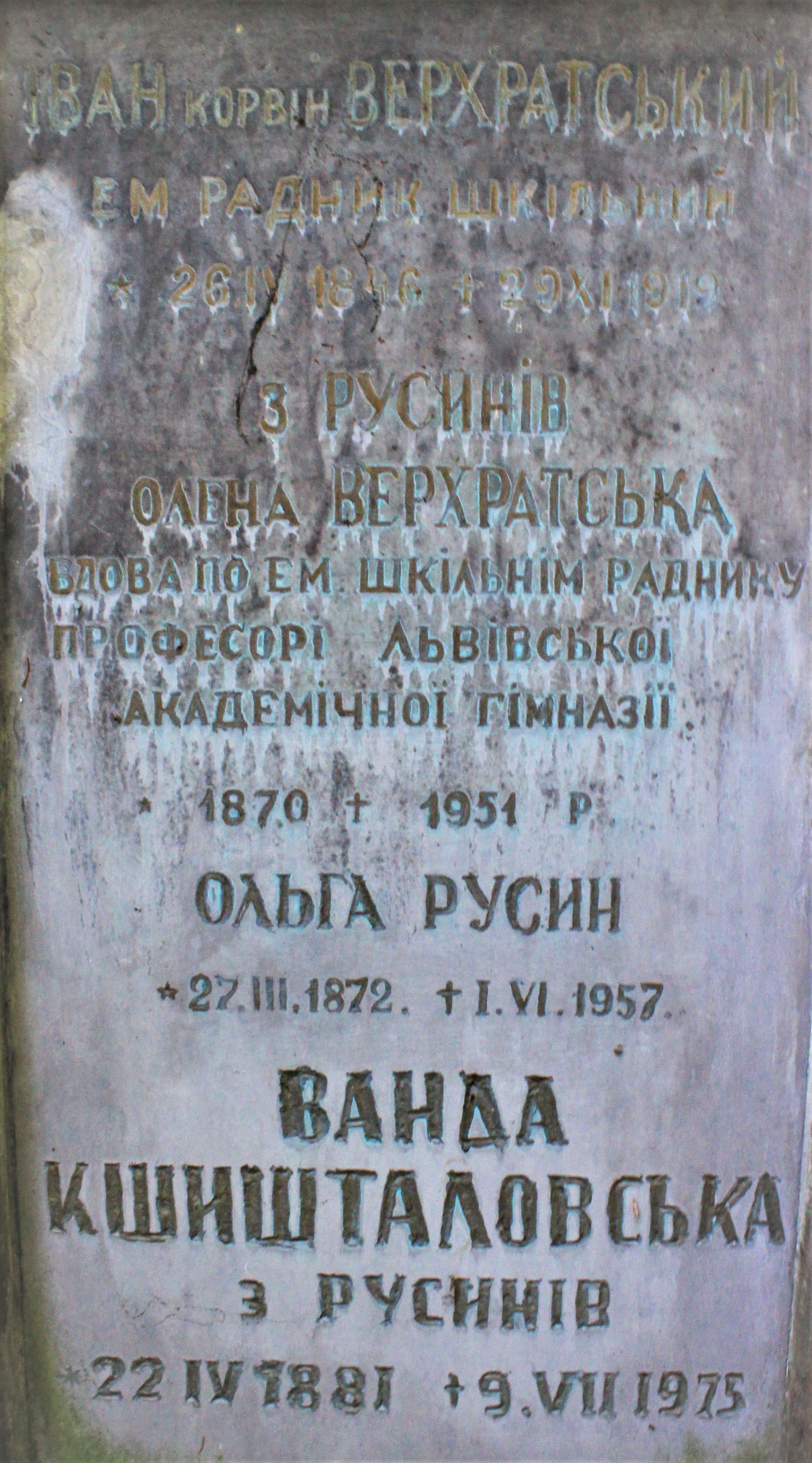
The table outside the tomb of the Verkhratskyi family.

Verkhratskyi died on 29 November 1919 in Lviv. He was buried at Lychakiv Cemetery.
