= Yuriampil =

Rural locality in Ternopil Oblast, Ukraine

Yuriampil Юр'ямпіль
- Location in Ternopil Oblast
- Coordinates: 48°44′27″N 25°56′24″E
- Country: Ukraine
- Oblast: Ternopil Oblast
- Raion: Chortkiv Raion
- Hromada: Bilche-Zolote Hromada
- Time zone: UTC+2 (EET)
  - Summer (DST): UTC+3 (EEST)
- Postal code: 48733

Yuriampil (Ukrainian: Юр'ямпіль) is a village in Bilche-Zolote rural hromada, Chortkiv Raion, Ternopil Oblast, Ukraine.

== History ==
Known from the 17th century.

After the liquidation of the Borshchiv Raion on 19 July 2020, the village became part of the Chortkiv Raion.

== Religion ==
- two churches of St. Demetrius (1840, built by the OCU; UGCC)
