= Verteba Cave =

Gypsum cave system in Bilche-Zolote, Ukraine

- Печера Вертеба
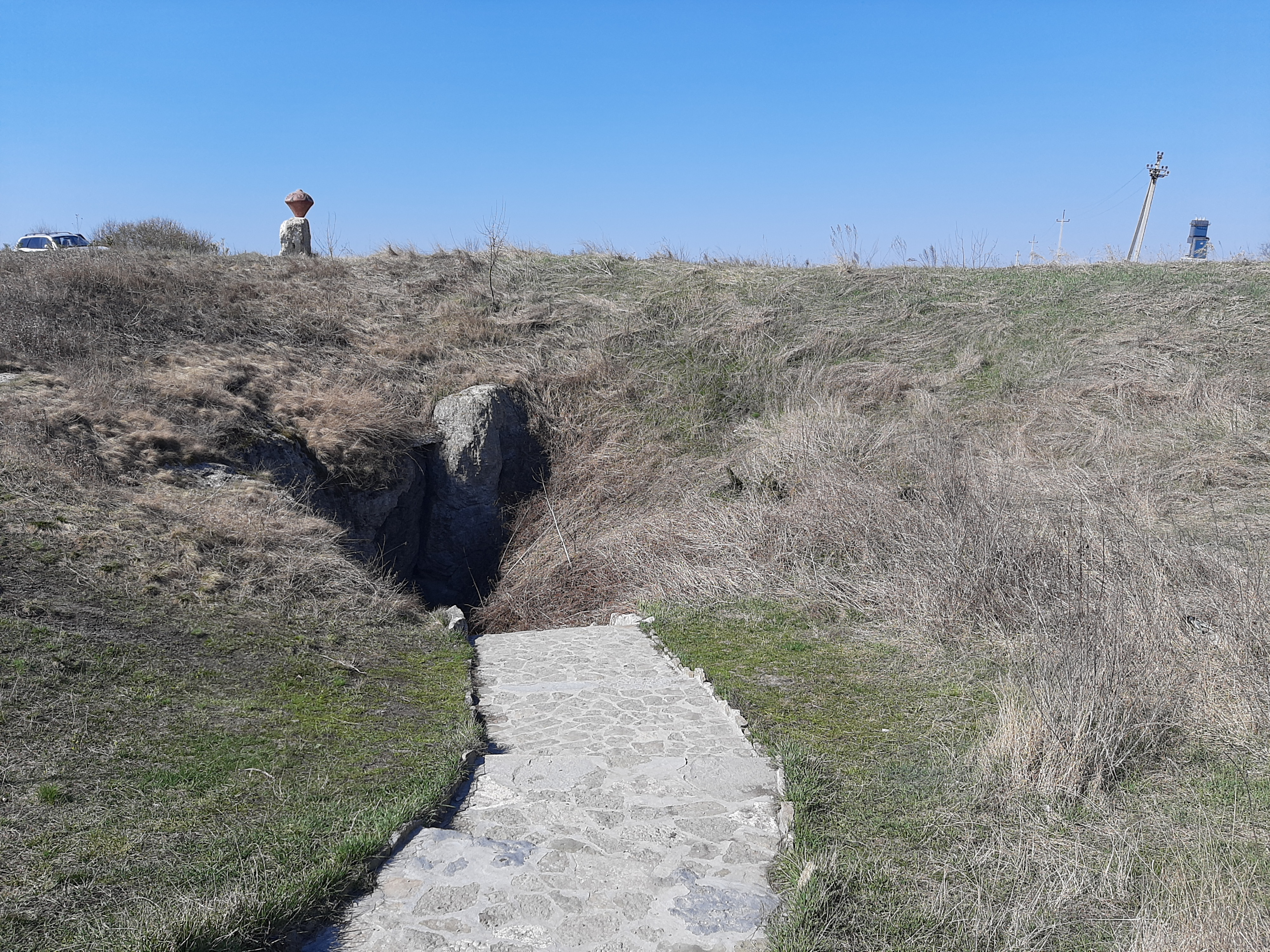
- Entrance to the cave

- Location within Ternopil Oblast Location within Ukraine
- Location of Verteba Cave in Ukraine
- Location: near Bilche-Zolote, Chortkiv Raion, Ternopil Oblast, Ukraine
- Coordinates: 48°47′20″N 25°52′17″E
- Length: 8.555 km (5.316 mi)–9 km (5.6 mi)
- Elevation: 274 metres (899 ft)
- Discovery: 1822
- Geology: Gypsum, karst
- Entrances: 1
- Show cave opened: 2004
- Show cave length: 800 m (2,600 ft)

Verteba Cave (Ukrainian: Печера Вертеба, romanized: Pechera Verteba) is a karstic cave near the village of Bilche-Zolote, Chortkiv Raion, Ternopil Oblast, Ukraine. It sits near the Seret river, on a high plateau known as the Podolian Upland, and is one of several such gypsum caves in the region; however, Verteba is the only cave in this cluster to show signs of prehistoric occupation. In Copper Age Europe, the cave was inhabited periodically by members of the Cucuteni–Trypillia culture. Thousands of artefacts, including ceramic vessels, clay figurines, bones, and tools, have been found inside. Human remains—which mainly consist of disembodied skulls—have been found bearing injuries consistent with having been intentionally killed.

Between October 1942 and April 1943, 28 Jews from Bilche-Zolote and Korolivka hid in the cave to escape the Holocaust. When the Gestapo stormed the cave, the group was forced to relocate to Priest's Grotto; most survived the war, having hidden underground for nearly two years. Their ordeal was the subject of a 2007 book, The Secret of Priest's Grotto: A Holocaust Survival Story; and a 2012 documentary, No Place on Earth.

Verteba partially opened to the public as a show cave in 2004. Inside, the cave hosts the Museum of Trypillian Culture, displaying archaeological finds from the past 200 years.

== Description ==
Verteba Cave is located 2 km (1.2 mi) from the village of Bilche-Zolote, Chortkiv Raion, Ternopil Oblast, Ukraine, at an elevation of 274 metres (899 ft). It is one of several karstic caves located in the Podillia–Bukovynian or Transnistrian karst region on the Ukrainian Podolian Upland, a loess plateau cut by several ravines and rivers. Verteba itself is on the eastern bank of the Seret, a tributary of the Dniester. There is only one entrance, located in a depression caused by a collapsed sinkhole. The cave features a labyrinth of interlocking passageways. Estimates of the total length of the passageways range from 8.555 km (5.316 mi) to 9 km (5.6 mi). The overall surface area of the cave floor is about 23,000 m^{2} (250,000 sq ft) and the cave's capacity is about 47,000 m^{2} (510,000 sq ft).

== History ==
=== Discovery and excavations ===
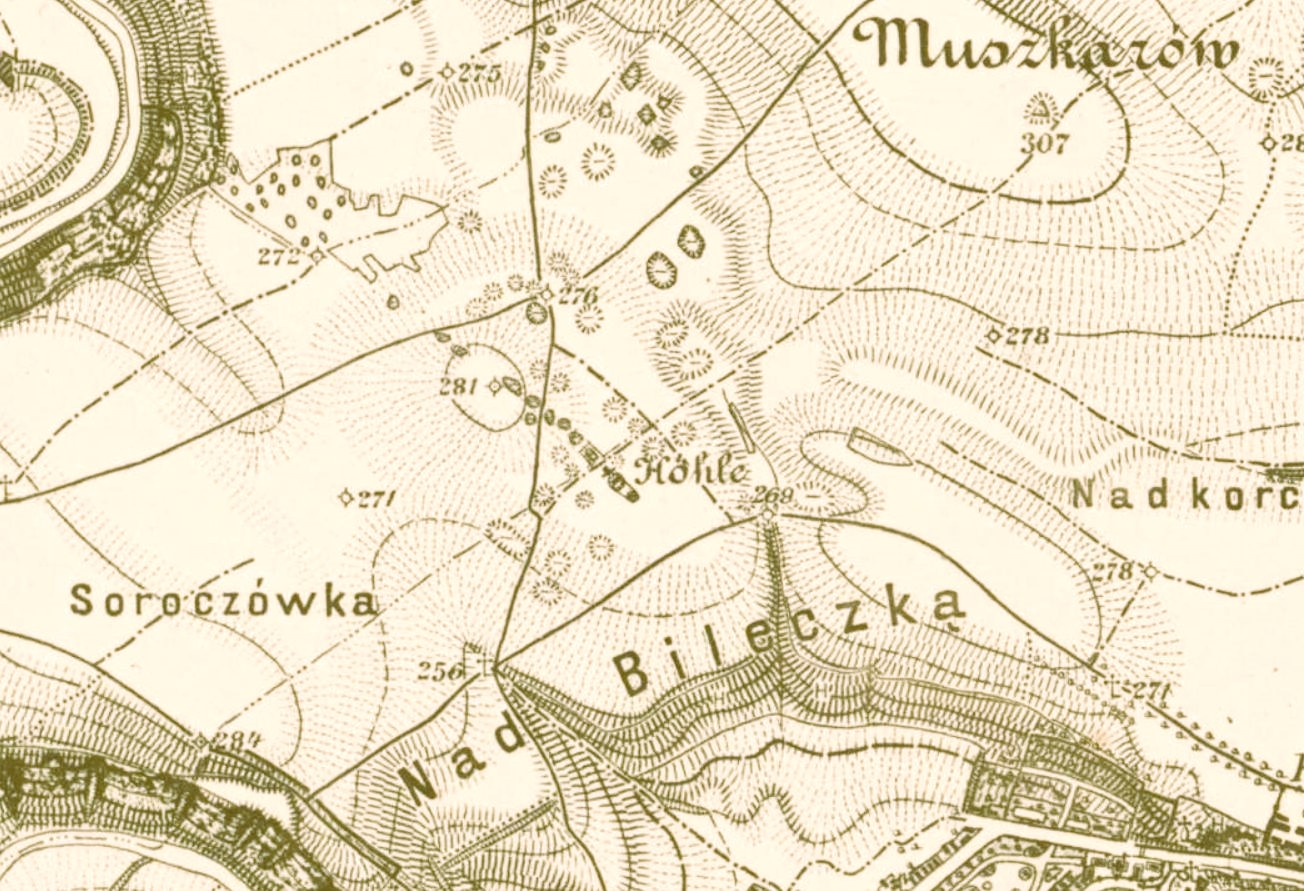
Verteba Cave ("Höhle") on an 1887 map of Bilche-Zolote

During the 19th century, the land on which the cave sits was part of an estate owned by the Polish noble Sapieha family. Jan Khmeletsky discovered the cave in 1822. Prince Leon Sapieha was part of the Anthropological Committee of the Polish Academy of Arts and Sciences in Kraków and permitted Adam Kirkor to conduct the first explorations in 1876 and 1878. These archaeological excavations yielded two human skeletons and several additional incomplete sets of remains. Further studies took place sporadically between the 1890s and 1900s by Gotfryd Ossowski and Włodzimierz Demetrykiewicz, between 1914 and 1928, and again after World War II. After the war, the cave again began attracting tourists for its geologic and archaeological interest, and it officially opened as a show cave to the public in 2004.

Beginning in 1996, Mykhailo Sokhatskyi from the Borshchiv Local History Museum has led periodic archaeological expeditions. By 2010, the team had excavated 64 m^{2} (690 sq ft) of the cave. The 2018 field season unveiled a new hearth and a bag of flint blanks. The flint was not from local quarries but instead originated in Volyn Oblast and was subsequently brought into Verteba Cave.

=== Holocaust occupation ===
On 12 October 1942, 28 Jews from seven families fled from Bilche-Zolote and the nearby village of Korolivka to Verteba Cave, seeking refuge from mass executions by the Nazis, who had arrived the year prior. Tourism to the cave had by then halted for the winter months. Upon arrival, the group chose a chamber measuring 12 m (39 ft) across and sealed it off with rubble. Once a week, three of the men—who had obtained special licences to remain in the area collecting scrap metal—performed a supply run, bringing a wagon with supplies under the cover of darkness. As the cave has no reliable water source—the inhabitants collected water runoff from the walls—and the Nazis planned to resume searching the forest for hiding Jews the following spring, the refugees regarded Verteba as a temporary shelter. To avoid discovery, in February 1943, they moved deeper into the cave, 900 metres (3,000 ft) from the entrance. They also dug out a smaller, second entrance as an emergency escape route, towards which they carved steps into the stone. In one part of the cave, a survivor inscribed hashomer ('the protector') in Hebrew on the wall.

On 5 April 1943, their hiding place was discovered and the Gestapo stormed the cave. All but five of the Jews, who were taken by the Nazis, managed to escape through the back entrance; three more later escaped execution and rejoined the group. The survivors spent a few weeks hiding around Bilche-Zolote and Korolivka before a neighbour told them about Priest's Grotto. There, they waited out the remainder of the war and Holocaust until Soviet troops arrived in April 1944.

One of the survivors, Esther Sterner, published a memoir entitled We Fight to Survive about the experience in 1975. Christos Nicola later published a book, The Secret of Priest's Grotto: A Holocaust Survival Story, about the group's ordeal and his excursions into the caves to corroborate their story. In 2012, a documentary, No Place on Earth, was released. Some of the artefacts from their occupation, as well as some that belonged to Nazis, have also been retrieved by archaeologists.

== Geology ==
Verteba Cave, as with many other local caves in the Transnistrian formation, is set inside a gypsum sequence that developed under a shallow sea during the Middle Miocene epoch. The eventual evaporation of the sea into separate lagoons left behind large deposits of gypsum, limestone, clay, and other layers of sedimentary rock. Stratigraphically, this gypsum layer is located between the Eastern European Platform and the Carpathian Foredeep. Over time, the unstable gypsum has caused collapses on the surface, one of these causing a steep depression that forms the current cave entrance. Although most of the cave is covered by modern Quaternary topsoil and limestone, some outcroppings of gypsum are visible around the entrance.

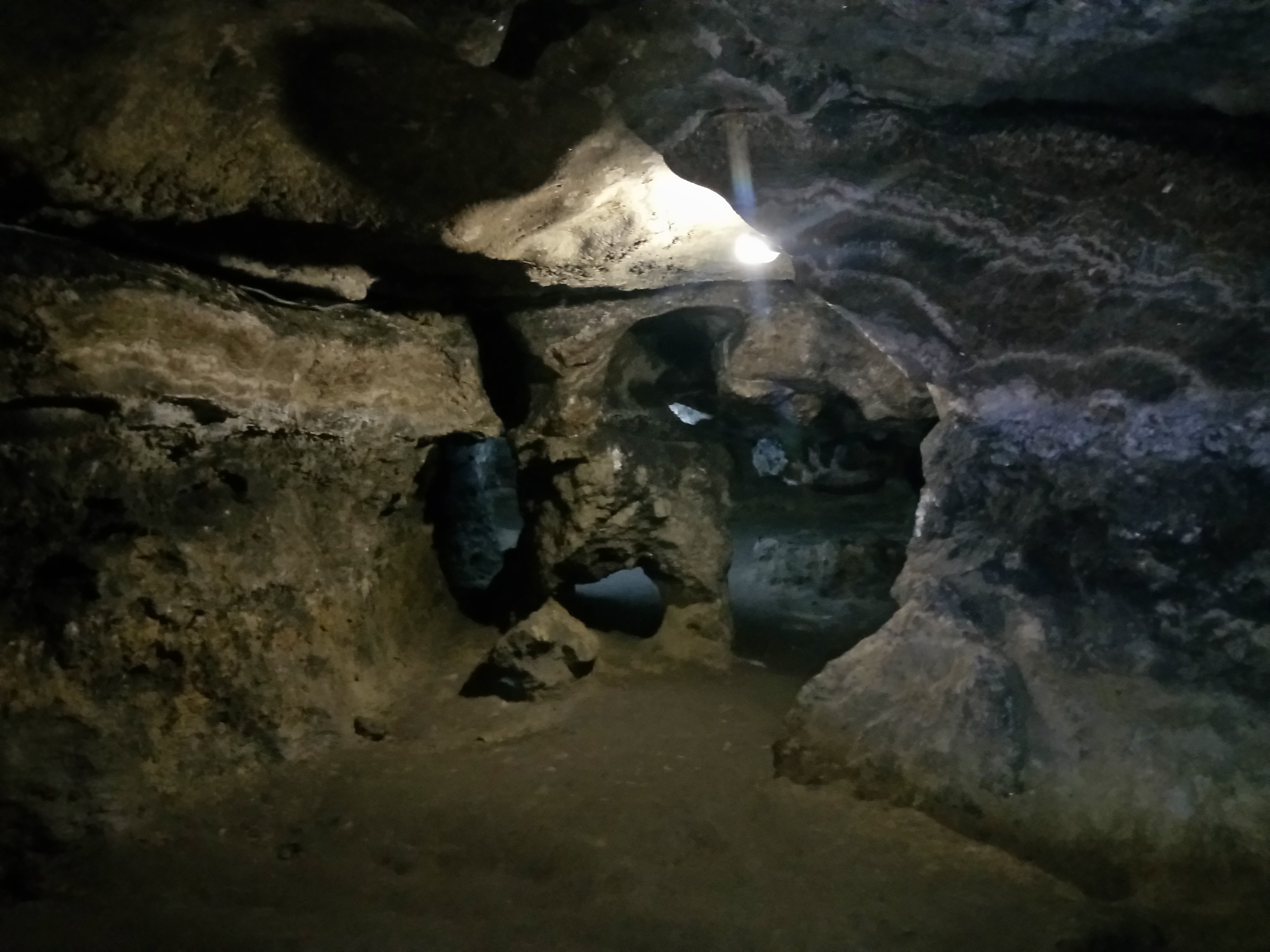
Inside Verteba Cave

The cave's layout consists of a maze of interlocking passageways and galleries. Several theories regarding the cave's formation have been proposed. One early group of scholars posits that it formed during the Early-Middle Pleistocene, through the erosion of underground streams fed by the nearby Seret, which bends close to the site. In 2000, a new theory emerged that springs from underground aquifers formed the caves through artesian flow, in which groundwater below and around the cave permeated through more porous rock layers into the gypsum and carved out the channels. This process could have taken place between the Late Pliocene and the Early Pleistocene.

Deposits of different materials—some geologic, some biogenic—make up the surfaces of the cave. The floors are lined with silty loam or chernozem soils. Overall, both the topsoil and the gypsum rock above the cave create a semi-permeable surface prone to collapse, through which water and soil can enter; water movement has created calcite speleothems and clastic rock debris litters the cave. These collapses have also rendered some caves that might have been used in prehistory inaccessible, and other entrances to the cave complex may have existed at that time. Verteba has gone through regular periods of heavy flooding by silt, creating undisturbed soil deposits even between the prehistoric human layers of occupation.

== Archaeology ==
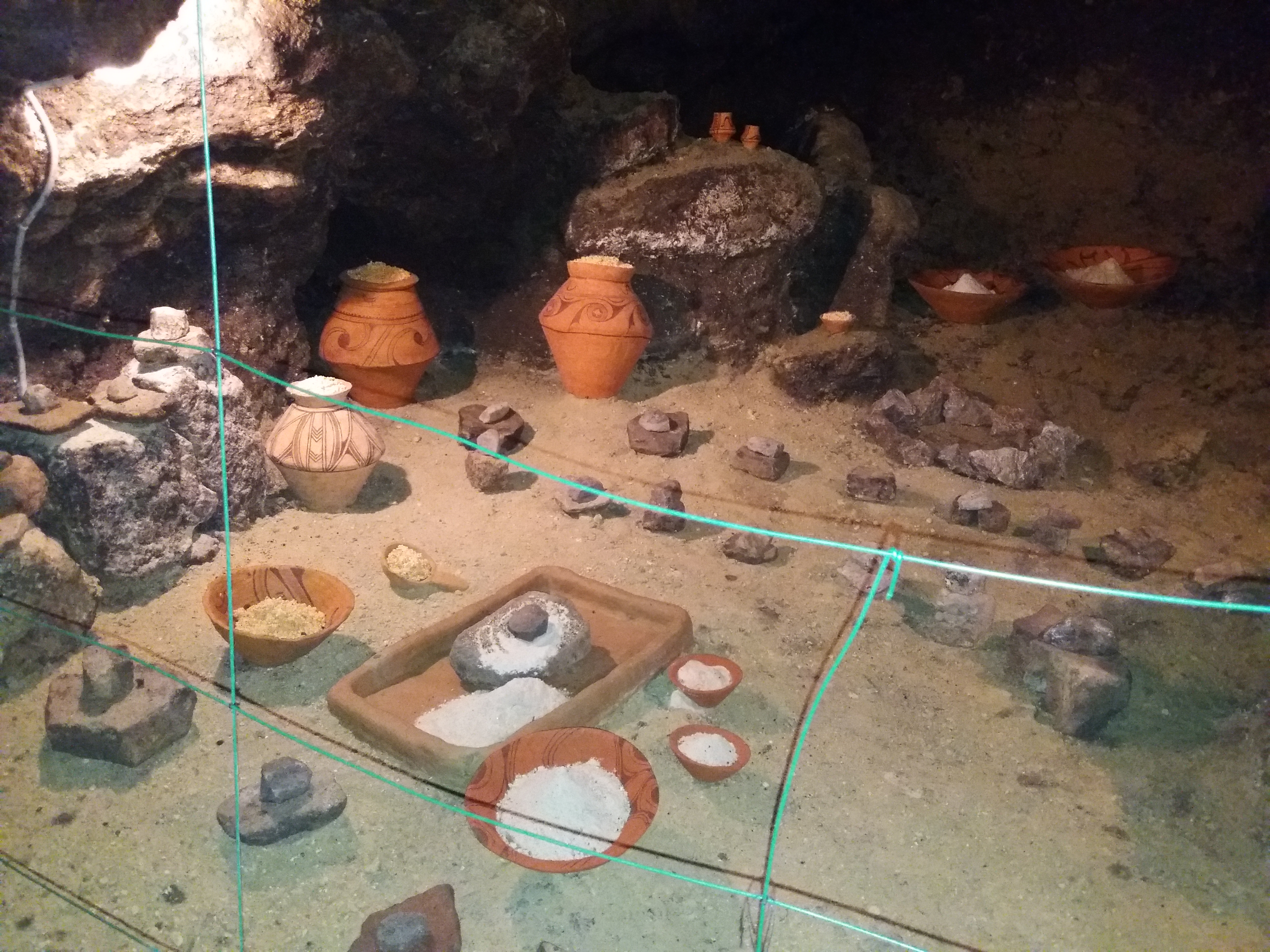
Artefacts on display in Verteba Cave

Although Verteba is only one of several karst caverns in the area, it is the only one known to have prehistoric occupation. Early human presence at Verteba was part of a larger settlement pattern of the Cucuteni–Trypillia culture, the dominant, mostly-agricultural culture of Copper Age Eastern Europe at the time. About 5,000 years before present (BP), people began settling, farming, and ranching along the local rivers, building adobe houses and creating ceramic vessels. Within 10 km (6.2 mi) of the site, at least 16 other settlements from this culture have been identified, dating between 3700–2750 BCE. Within the Dneister Canyon, population density measured about 12 people per square kilometre, making it one of the most densely populated areas of Europe at the time.

Verteba Cave's prehistoric occupation occurred in three distinct periods. Several different groups from the Cucuteni–Trypillian culture occupied the cave at different times. The occupation periods at Verteba Cave fall within three distinct horizons: the BII (4100–3600 BCE), CI (3600–3200 BCE), and CII (3400–2750 BCE) horizons. Most researchers agree that Verteba Cave was not used as a permanent residence and possibly functioned as a temporary shelter, or even a religious center. However, the 2018 discovery of a permanent hearth similar to the ones in the surface settlements may provide evidence of long-term occupation.

Most of the excavated archaeological material is kept either in the Archaeological Museum of Kraków or in the Borshchiv Local History Museum. The Kraków collection contains papers detailing the earliest archaeological excavations, over 35,000 ceramic sherds and 300 intact vessels, approximately 120 clay figurines, other clay objects like spindle whorls and fishing sinkers, and hundreds of other artefacts. One of the most prolific deposits of archaeological material occurs in a region of the cave known as Site 7. Here, ceramics, anthropomorphic figurines, bones, and antler or stone tools have been recovered. Larger structures such as waste pits, dugouts, sleeping platforms made of fired clay, and hearths have also been discovered.

Hearths, which left behind traces of ash, charcoal, and burnt clay, fired the gypsum cave walls, causing some surfaces to crumble. For light, people inside the cave carried portale lamps, as well as having installed stationary open-flame lamps at intervals along passageways. Some of these lamps left behind spots of overfired gypsum on the cave walls, about 0.7 metres (2.3 ft) above the cave floor.

=== Ceramics ===
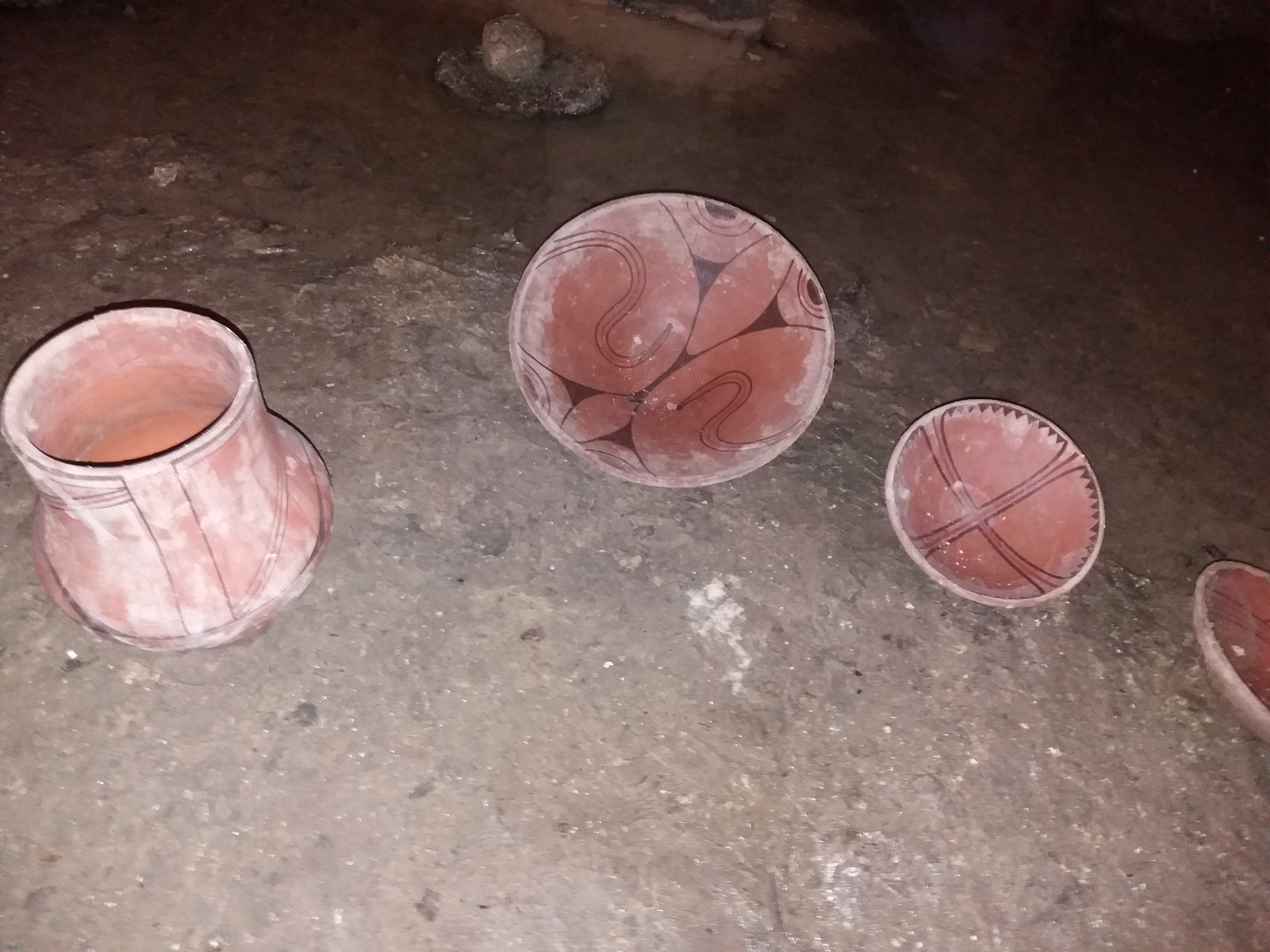
Various pots recovered from Verteba Cave

Three different Cucuteni–Trypillian ceramic typologies, which roughly correspond to the occupation periods, have been identified amongst the Verteba Cave pottery: the Schypynetska (c. 3900–3450 BCE), Koshylovetska (c. 3450–3100 BCE), and the Kasperivska (c. 3200–3000 BCE). The site was busiest around the first transition period, c. 3500 BCE.

About 2,500 ceramic vessels and 200 cooking vessels from the early Schypynetska group have been recovered. This group occupied the cave for about 195 years; a 2010 study dated a sample of ceramics to 3745–3550 BCE. Their pots come in a variety of shapes and are characterized by their grooved, spiralling ornamentation and were painted with red, black, brown, and white pigments. However, dozens of ceramics and fragments from this era were found to have been imported from the neighbouring Badrazhy group, as well as the more distant Bodrogkeresztúr and Lublin-Volhynia cultures.

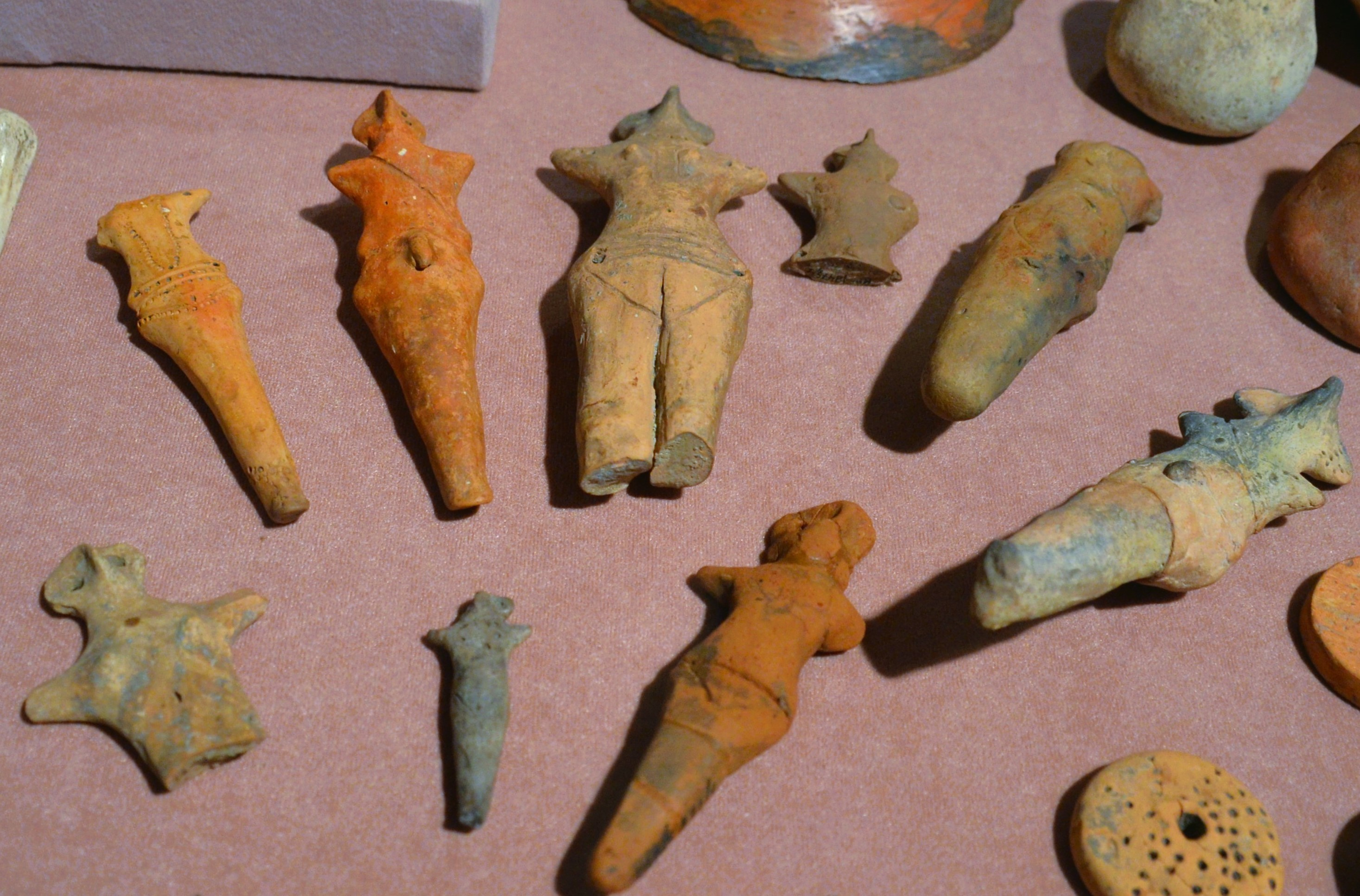
Figurines found during excavations

Many samples of the Koshylovetska pottery group display patterns that are more characteristic of the Branzeni and Badrazhy assemblages within the Cucuteni–Trypillia culture. Besides vessels, this group notably includes clay anthropomorphic and zoomorphic figurines. Such artwork began to be uncovered during the late 19th-century excavations, and are believed to have been fastened to either the walls or ceiling of the cave. Of the 113 humanoid figures excavate before 2022, almost all are female, only five being designated as male. Generally, most are sculpted standing up, with two legs that join together into one foot, and two eye holes carved into a disc-shaped head. A further five female figures were discovered in 2023. 133 other figures represent various animals, including bears, bulls, horses, goats, and sheep. These are stocky but proportionate with four short legs, and several have tails.

The Kasperivska pottery group contains signs of influence from the neighboring Funnelbeaker and Baden cultures. Several features of the Verteba Cave ceramics also reflect Anatolian and Balkan influences, which fits into a broader pattern of similar pottery that stretched as far as modern-day Poland. These vessels are relatively colourless. Combined, the Koshylovetska and Kasperivska groups occupied the cave for a period of about 803 years, radiocarbon dated to about 3550–2747 BCE, with a period of about 87 years between them during which the cave was disused.

=== Other artefacts ===
One of the most symbolic finds is that of two bone plates carved in the shapes of bull's heads. The first was excavated sometime between 1898 and 1904 by Demetrykiewicz, and the second was found by Sokhatskyi in the 1990s. One of the plates features a design in the shape of a female figure. The shape of the horns resembling a lyre suggests these were intended to represent aurochs, of which representations are found at various other worship sites in the Near East and elsewhere in Neolithic Europe. Auroch horns have been found in Verteba, often close to human remains.

Various tools, including grinding stones used for grain, flint blades, and other bone, stone, or copper instruments have also been found. There are also remnants of necklaces that were ornamented with shell beads, animal teeth, and bird bones.

=== Human remains ===
Human remains located at Verteba Cave, while mostly attributed to the Cucuteni–Trypillian occupation, also include individuals who lived before and after this time. Osteological samples have returned dates ranging between 7955–3522 BCE. The earliest remains date to the Mesolithic.

Initial radiocarbon dating on bones found in the three separate Cucuteni–Trypillian culture layers returned calibrated dates of 3951–3538 BCE, 3758–3371 BCE, and 3265–2620 BCE, corresponding with the ceramic periods. The burials here are a rare example of Cucuteni–Trypillian dead; very few such sites contain burials or human remains, and other Cucuteni-Trypillia sites contain remains than postdate those at Verteba.

First account of human remains at Verteba was published in 1948, describing a find of 21 articulated skeletons. However, it is not clear if these date to the Trypillian times. The remains of no fewer than 17 individuals were uncovered at Verteba during subsequent excavations. At least 36 more individuals—whose remains consist mainly of crania but also some disarticulated limbs and vertebrae—were found between 2008 and 2012. Overall, most of the remains recovered consist of disarticulated cranial and post-cranial remains. The majority of remains are those of adult males, but there were several females and children and additional remains of indeterminate sex.

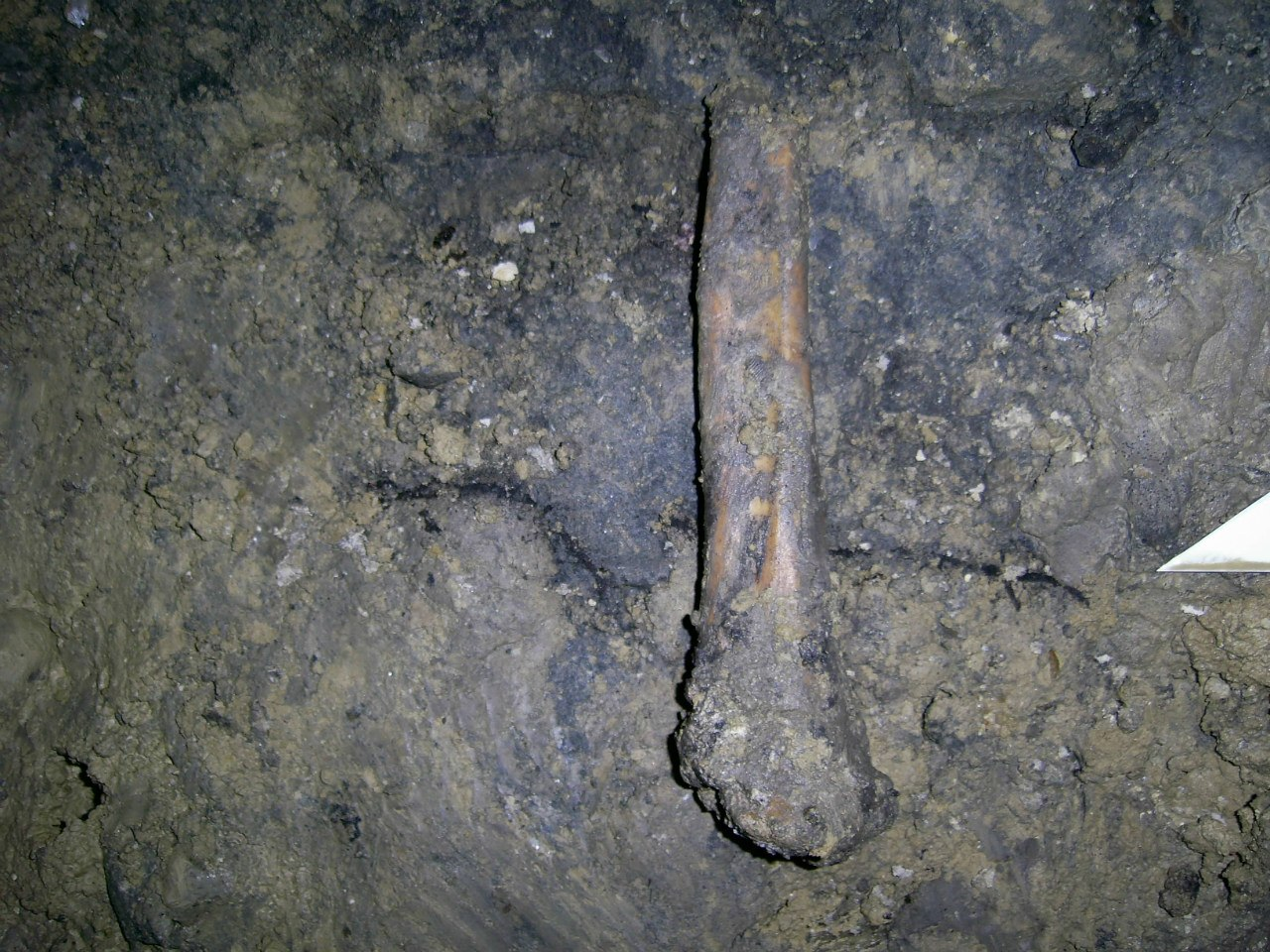
A bone in situ inside the cave

The remains found at Verteba represent a departure from usual burial practices of European Enelithic farming groups. Isotopic analysis of the human remains supports them being deposited in clusters of occupation, rather than deposited slowly over a long period of time. Additionally, many of the remains seem to have been deposited in the cave long after death and display signs of exposure, such as sun bleaching and scavenging marks left by animals, and disarticulation, suggesting they were moved to the cave long after death and decay. Therefore, it appears probable that the human remains found at Verteba are secondary burials, having undergone excarnation beforehand.

Some scattered bones and skeletons have been dated to much later time periods and appear to be the result either of incidental entry into the cave, or a continued occupation for which associated artefacts inside the cave are absent. A 1948 discovery of 21 skeletons all consolidated in one corner may have been the result of a rockslide; as of 2011, these remains have not been dated. Later finds include bones dating to the Bronze Age Gáva-Holigrady culture; the epicentre of this culture is about 15 km (9.3 mi) to the south in Holigrady. Much later Scythian remains were dated to 781–511 BCE, and another bone dates to the 8th century AD, during the Kievan Rus' period.

==== Violence ====
Many of the Cucuteni–Trypillian remains display injuries that occurred around the time of death and were likely fatal. A 2018 study that evaluated 25 skulls found that 11 had suffered trauma. Most injuries were located on the top or back of the head, suggesting the victims were kneeling or lying down when struck. A few displayed healed facial injuries that might have occurred during combat. Madden et al. suggest this is consistent with raiding activity rather than battle, or perhaps motivated by politics or rituals. Several skulls also showed signs of scalping after death, evidenced by several sharp, circumferential cuts around the top of the head. Some of the crania found at Verteba bear evidence of possible trepanation.

These findings fit into a larger trend of violent contact between the Cucuteni–Trypillian culture and their neighbours. The two main theories about the motivations behind the rise in violence are either competition among neighbours for resources, or warfare between the Cucuteni–Trypillians and migrant groups moving in from the peripheries of their culture.

At least four skulls had their brains removed post-mortem, which was performed either through the nose, eye sockets, or through drilling holes in the temporal bone or foramen magnum of the cranium; and was sometimes accompanied by the deposition of red ochre. This practice might have served a ritualistic function.

==== Genetic analysis ====
Mitochondrial DNA (mtDNA) analysis has placed the Cucuteni–Trypillian remains among haplogroups R0, including subclades HV and H; JT and its subclades, T and J; K; V; and U. These groups and their frequencies are consistent with Cucuteni–Trypillian and other Neolithic sites across central Europe during this time period, especially displaying similarities to the Funnelbeaker culture. All except haplogroup U are thought to have arisen from migrations of Anatolian farmers into the Balkans and Mediterranean Europe before diffusing north into the central and northern reaches of the continent, and bringing agriculture with them. However, haplogroup U predates the Anatolian migrations and is of Mesolithic hunter-gatherer origin. Compared to the agricultural haplogroups, its presence at Verteba is rare, and suggests the local population had been largely replaced by the migratory groups. Even the presence of hunter-gatherer lineage is thought to have arisen not from local populations, but instead from hunter-gatherer groups in western Europe.

At the whole genome level, Trypillian ancestry is predominantly derived from the Neolithic farmers of Europe and, ultimately, from Anatolia, with a 14% admixture from Balkan hunter gatherers and 5% ancestry from the Caucasus-Lower Volga migrants in the northwestern Pontic region.

The Bronze Age remains at Verteba have more varied lineages. The first tested Bronze Age remains had mitochondrial haplogroups of H and U5a1a; the presence of the H haplogroup across both the Copper and Bronze Ages might suggest a common local maternal lineage. One set of Middle Bronze Age remains dating to 1960–1770 BCE has ties to the Yamna and Corded Ware cultures, suggesting a more local Carpathian origin than the earlier Cucuteni–Trypillian remains. A second set of Late Bronze Age remains had more similarities with the Bell Beaker culture, which was already extinct, than with any other group.

==== Diet ====
Stable isotope analysis of human teeth recovered at the site suggested the cave's inhabitants grew up locally. Among the Neolithic remains, diets were likely best represented by plants and herbivores, such as livestock; despite the cave's location near the Seret River, little evidence has been found to support a fish-based diet.

== Zoology ==
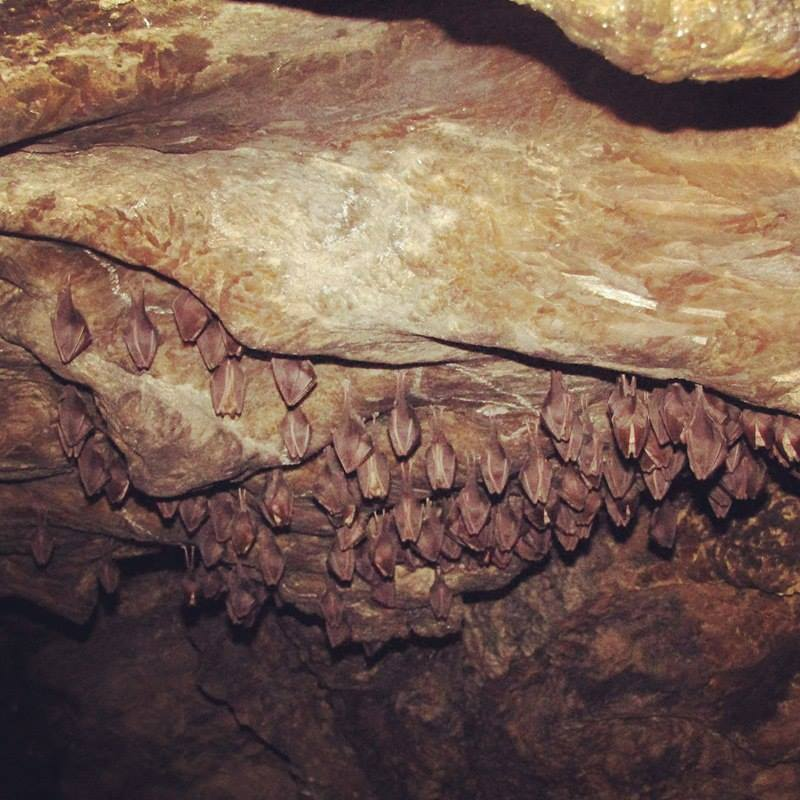
Bats inside the cave

Prehistoric non-human bones have also been uncovered during archaeological excavations. Species represented include mammoth, aurochs, chickens, pigs, European hare, equines, caprines, and European pond turtle. A domestic dog bone has been dated to the Scythian Iron Age occupation, and one of the chicken bones recovered is medieval.

In modern times, the cave is inhabited by a variety of animals, most notably by a large colony of bats, which has contributed a large deposit of guano to the cave. The most common species is the lesser horseshoe bat, but greater mouse-eared bats and brown long-eared bats are also present. Bat populations severely declined after modern humans began regularly visiting the cave, with only 12 bats being counted in 1996. Conservation efforts have since increased the colony size. Other animals, such as rodents, foxes, and martens, have also been recorded as visiting the cave.

== See also ==
- Dniester Canyon
- Geography of Ukraine
- List of longest caves
