= Myshkiv =

Rural locality in Ternopil Oblast, Ukraine

Myshkiv Мишків
- Village
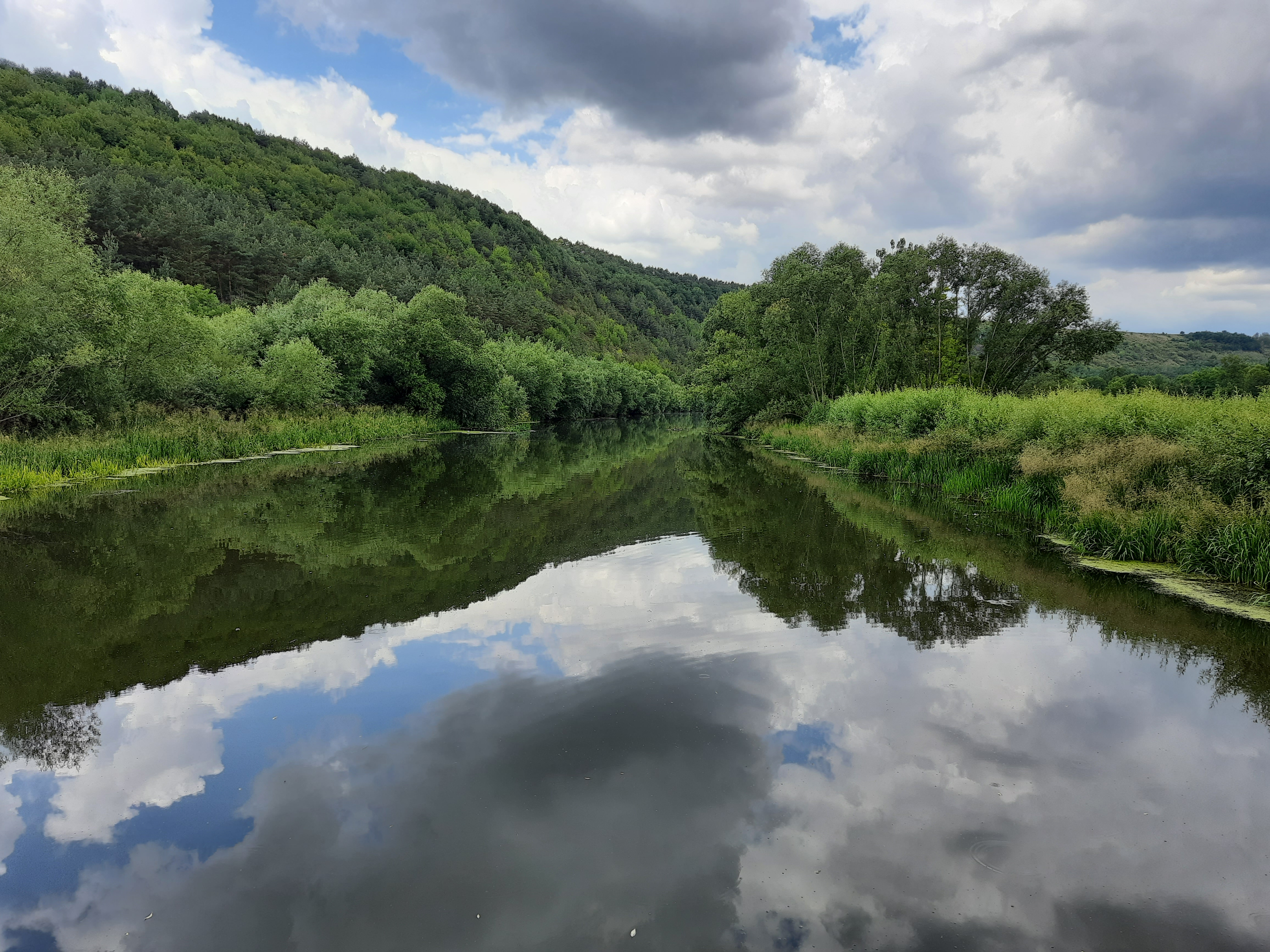
- Seret River near the village

- Location in Ternopil Oblast
- Coordinates: 48°46′28″N 25°49′36″E
- Country: Ukraine
- Oblast: Ternopil Oblast
- Raion: Chortkiv Raion
- Hromada: Bilche-Zolote rural hromada
- Time zone: UTC+2 (EET)
  - Summer (DST): UTC+3 (EEST)
- Postal code: 48605

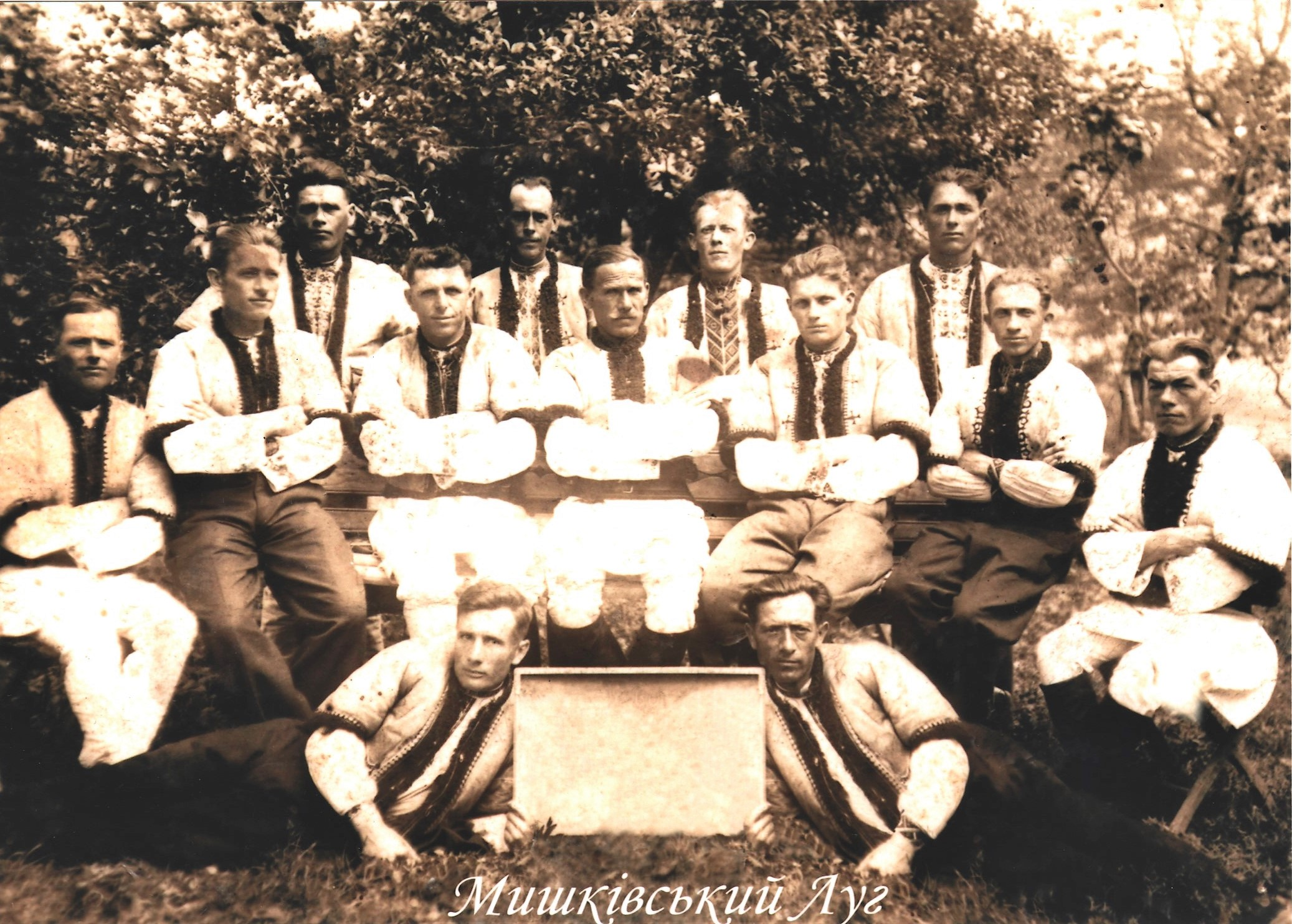
The "Luh" Union in Myshkiv in the 1930s

Myshkiv (Ukrainian: Мишків) is a village in Bilche-Zolote rural hromada, Chortkiv Raion, Ternopil Oblast, Ukraine.

== History ==
The first written mention is from 1495.

After the liquidation of the Borshchiv Raion on 19 July 2020, the village became part of the Chortkiv Raion.

== Religion ==
- Church of St. Demetrius (1784, brick, restored in 1927, OCU),
- Roman Catholic Church (1910, not functioning since 1945),
- Chapel of the Mother of God (2000).

== Sources ==
- (in Ukrainian) Дубецький І., Олійник В., Сорока, М., Мишків // Ternopil Encyclopedic Dictionary: in 4 v. / editorial board: H. Yavorskyi and other, Ternopil: "Zbruch", 2005, V. 2: К—О, S. 524—525. — ISBN 966-528-199-2.
- "Myszków". Geographical Dictionary of the Kingdom of Poland (in Polish). p. 365.
