= Shershenivka =

Rural locality in Ternopil Oblast, Ukraine

Shershenivka Шершенівка
- Location in Ternopil Oblast
- Coordinates: 48°49′2″N 25°49′9″E
- Country: Ukraine
- Oblast: Ternopil Oblast
- Raion: Chortkiv Raion
- Hromada: Bilche-Zolote Hromada
- Time zone: UTC+2 (EET)
  - Summer (DST): UTC+3 (EEST)
- Postal code: *

Shershenivka (Ukrainian: Шершенівка) is a village in Bilche-Zolote rural hromada, Chortkiv Raion, Ternopil Oblast, Ukraine.

== History ==
Known from 1445.

After the liquidation of the Borshchiv Raion on 19 July 2020, the village became part of the Chortkiv Raion.

== Religion ==
- Church of the Transfiguration (1901, brick)
- chapel (late 18th century, rebuilt in 1994)

== Sources ==
- (in Ukrainian) Батайлюк В., Уніят, В., Шершенівка // Ternopil Encyclopedic Dictionary: in 4 v. / editorial board: H. Yavorskyi and other, Ternopil: "Zbruch", 2008, V. 3: П—Я, S. 636. — ISBN 978-966-528-279-2.
- "Szerszeniowce". Geographical Dictionary of the Kingdom of Poland (in Polish). 11. Warszawa: Kasa im. Józefa Mianowskiego. 1890. p. 905.
