= Bilche-Zolote rural hromada =

Rural hromada in Ternopil Oblast, Ukraine

Bilche-Zolote rural hromada Більче-Золотецька сільська громада
- hromada
- Location within Ternopil Oblast Location within Ukraine
- Coordinates: 48°46′21″N 25°52′51″E
- Country: Ukraine
- Oblast: Ternopil Oblast
- Raion: Chortkiv Raion
- Administrative center: Bilche-Zolote

Government
  - Hromada head: Halyna Ohorodnyk

Area
  - Total: 1,084 km^{2} (419 sq mi)

Population (2022)
  - Total: 3,918
- Villages: 7
- Website: bilche-zolotecka-gromada.gov.ua

Bilche-Zolote rural territorial hromada (Ukrainian: Більче-Золотецька територіальна громада, romanized: Bilche-Zolotetska silska terytorialna hromada) is a hromada in Ukraine, in Chortkiv Raion of Ternopil Oblast. The administrative center is the village of Bilche-Zolote. Its population is 3,918 (2022 estimate)

== History ==
It was formed on 12 September 2016 by amalgamation of Bilche-Zolote, Oleksyntsi and Shershenivka village councils of Borshchiv Raion.

Until 19 July 2020, it belonged to the Borshchiv Raion.

On 18 November 2020, the Myshkiv village council of Chortkiv Raion joined the community.

== Settlements ==
The hromada consists of 7 villages:

- Bilche-Zolote
- Myshkiv
- Monastyrok
- Mushkariv
- Oleksyntsi
- Shershenivka
- Yuriampil
