= Yevgeniya Dolinyuk =

Ukranian politician (1914–1990)

- Євгенія Долинюк
- Born: Yevgeniya Oleksiivna Prodan; 25 April [O.S. 12 April] 1914; Bilivtsi, Kingdom of Galicia and Lodomeria, Austria-Hungary
- Died: 20 October 1990 (aged 76); Boryshkivtsi, Ternopil Oblast, Ukrainian SSR
- Occupations: Kolkhoznik; Politician; Writer
- Years active: 1946–1990
- Spouse: Stepan Grigorovich Dolyniuk
- Children: 10
- Awards: Hero of Socialist Labour (x2); Order of Lenin (x3); Order of the October Revolution; Medal "For Labour Valour"; Order of Friendship of Peoples

Yevgeniya Oleksiivna Dolinyuk (née Prodan; Ukrainian: Євгенія Олексіївна Долинюк; 25 April [O.S. 12 April] 1914 – 20 October 1990) was a Ukrainian kolkhoznik, politician and writer. She was the team leader on the Stalin Collective Farm, Melnytsia-Podilska, Ternopil Oblast and harvested grain, corn and sugar beet from 1946. Dolinyuk was a deputy of the Supreme Soviet of the Ukrainian Soviet Socialist Republic, the Supreme Soviet of the Soviet Union and was a candidate member of the Central Committee of the 22nd Congress of the Communist Party of the Soviet Union. She was awarded the Hero of Socialist Labour twice, the Medal "For Labour Valour" twice, the Order of Lenin three times, the Order of the October Revolution and the Order of Friendship of Peoples.

== Biography ==
Dolinyuk was born into a family of farmers in the village of Bilivtsi, in the now Chortkiv Raion, Ternopil Oblast on 25 April 1914, and she had a brother. In either 1946 or 1947, she became the team leader named after a local school at the Stalin Collective Farm (formerly the T. Shevchenko Collective Farm, later the 22nd Congress of the Communist Party of the Soviet Union Collective Farm), Melnytsia-Podilska (later the Borshchiv District) of the Ternopil Oblast. Dolinyuk's team harvested 87.3 centners of grain corn per hectare on 10.2 hectares of farmland in 1950, increasing to an harvest of 160 centners per hectare on an area of 15 hectares by 1957.

Two years later, as a consequence of the application of progressive methods of growing corn, her section received up to 223 c of grain per hectare on an area of 20 hectares, and the yield of green mass with the beginning was about 1605 centners per hectare on an area of 105 hectares. In 1964, Dolinyuk's team began sowing sugar beets for the first time, harvest was 555 quintals per hectare that year and increasing to 876 in 1965. She harvested corn in grain was harvested at 85 centners/hectare on an area of 50 hectares and sugar beets - at 762 centners on each of 70 hectares in 1977.

Dolinyuk became a member of the Communist Party of the Soviet Union in 1953. She was an elected deputy of the fourth, fifth and seventh convocations of the Supreme Soviet of the Ukrainian Soviet Socialist Republic from 1955 to 1974. Dolinyuk was elected to serve as a deputy of the sixth convocation of the Soviet of Nationalities of the Supreme Soviet of the Soviet Union between 1962 and 1966. She was a delegate to the 21st Congress of the Communist Party of the Soviet Union and the 24th Congress of the Communist Party of the Soviet Union. Dolinyuk was made a candidate member of the 22nd Congress of the Central Committee of the Communist Party of the Soviet Union between 1961 and 1966.

She was the author of the books On the Campaigns for Big Corn in 1961, The Ranks of Master Corn Growers Are Growing in 1962 and We Are the Happy Generation in 1964. Dolinyuk had documentary film, Evgeniya Dolinyuk, was made about herself in 1960, and had a novel called Against the Wind written about her by the children's writer Ivan Bahmut in 1961.

== Personal life ==
She was a Greek Catholic. Dolinyuk was married to Stepan Grigorovich Dolyniuk and they had ten children. She died in the village of Boryshkivtsi, Ternopil Oblast on 20 October 1990, and was buried in the village.

== Recognition ==
Dolinyuk was presented with the title of Hero of Socialist Labour, the Order of Lenin, and the "Hammer and Sickle" gold medal by the Presidium of the Supreme Soviet of the Soviet Union on 4 May 1951 and again on 26 February 1958. She received 12 medals at the All-Union Agricultural Exhibition and the Exhibition of Achievements of the National Economy of the Soviet Union. Dolinyuk was awarded the Medal "For Labour Valour" twice 25 December 1959 and on 30 April 1966 and the Order of the October Revolution on 8 April 1971.

She was awarded the Order of Lenin twice more on 15 December 1972 and 24 December 1976 and the Order of Friendship of Peoples on 24 April 1984. In 1974, Dolinyuk was named a Honored Worker of Agriculture of the Ukrainian SSR. A bronze bust of her was erected in the village of Vyhoda, the location of the collective farm's headquarters, in December 1960.
