= Vilkhovets =

Vilkhovets is the name of several places in Ukraine,

- Vilkhovets (archaeological site), the site of an ancient mega-settlement
- Vilkhovets, Cherkasy Oblast
- Vilkhovets, Chotrtkiv Raion, Ternopil Oblast
- Vilkhovets, Ternopil Raion, Ternopil Oblast
