= Seventh Zionist Congress =

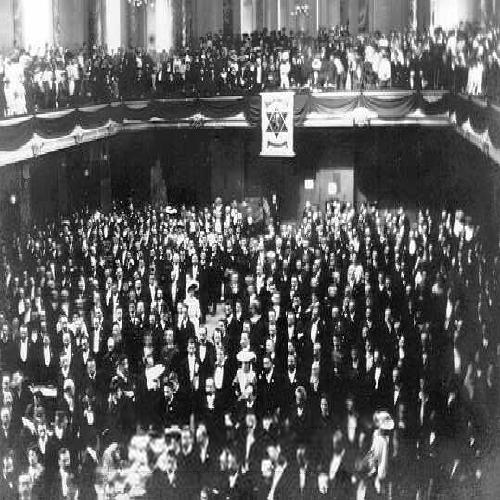
- Delegates of the Seventh Zionist Congress
- Native name: הקונגרס הציוני העולמי השביעי
- English name: 7th Zionist Congress
- Date: July 27 – August 2, 1905
- Location: Basel, Switzerland
- Type: Political Congress
- Theme: Zionism
- Organized by: World Zionist Congress

The Seventh Zionist Congress (Hebrew: הקונגרס הציוני העולמי השביעי) also called the Sabbath Congress met in Basel, Switzerland from July 27 to August 2, 1905, and was the seventh meeting of the World Zionist Congress. Among the issues discussed at the congress were the Uganda Scheme, the approach for settling the Land of Israel, and the leadership of the WZO. As a result of the congress the Territorialists and parts of the Labor Zionists broke away from the World Zionist Congress.

== Agenda ==
At the Seventh Congress were several topics: primary one was whether or support or oppose the Uganda Scheme, but others included the election of a new president of the WZO, and what approach should be used in settling Jews in the Land of Israel.

=== Uganda Scheme ===
The primary issue debated at the Seventh congress was whether of not to accept the British Uganda Scheme and on this issue there were two sides:

1. Israel Zangwill led the Territorialist Faction in supporting the Uganda Scheme. Zangwill criticized the Ottomans "exorbitant demands" and claimed that the Zionist movement must accept the offer in order to use the proposed territory as leverage in future negotiations for control of the Land of Israel. He also claimed that if the whole congress voted in favor of the Uganda Scheme the unity shown would pressure the British into making further concessions. Other Territorialists also argued that the congress should thank the British for their offer.
2. The anti-Territorialists argued against the Uganda Scheme, they argued that due to Britain recognition of Zionism they would likely support the Jews in eventually being given land in Ottoman Palestine, and that accepting the Uganda scheme would harm the momentum they had built, they also argued that the land was too poor, remote, and dangerous to be realistically settled.

The debate between the two groups got rather heated and lengthy, with a brawl breaking out between the two sides which was broken up by Swiss police. One delegate from France named Dr. Syrinkof put forward a proposal to let debating continue indefinitely which was overwhelmingly rejected, but this caused a small group of delegates to begin noisily disrupting the congress which led Nordau to dismiss everyone. Eventually the speaking was limited to 4 speakers with each given 30 minutes, though the time limit was later increased.

Eventually the Congress voted overwhelmingly to reject the Uganda Scheme with 300 out of 350 Russian delegates alone voting against the offer, though the congress still thanked Great Britain for the offer. Zangwill was left "heartbroken" at the rejection.

=== Settlement of Israel ===
There were two ideas of how to settle Jews in the Land of Israel debated at the congress:

1. Supporters of the late Herzl such as Nordau, Bodenheimer, and Marmorek favored a more diplomatic approach. These "Diplomatic Zionists" argued that Jewish settlement in Israel should be done in one large movement, but that this movement was impossible without obtaining concessions from the Ottoman Empire, and that as such they should obtain diplomatic concessions before any settlement could take place. With Herzl saying "Not a single man, not a single penny for this country, until the minimum of privileges, of guarantees, has been granted."
2. The Russian Zionists led by Ussishkin and Hohevei Zion argued that the settlement of the Land of Israel should focus instead on small scale settlement, and physical, pragmatic work (German:Gegenwartsarbeit) claiming that a larger Jewish population in the Land of Israel would make getting concessions easier. The "Practical Zionists" were not opposed to diplomacy in theory but believed both settlement and diplomacy should not aim for large sudden victories but rather for slower more gradual progress.

Ultimately a compromise was reached wherein small-scale philanthropic projects would be rejected for being too unorganized; but the Zionist movement would work to strengthen Jewish industry and agriculture in the Land of Israel in "as democratic a spirit as possible". A new executive committee was elected consisting of the three Practical Zionists: Professor Warburg, Ussishkin, and Kogan-Bemstein and the Diplomatic Zionists: Leopold Greenberg, Jacobus Kann, and Alexander Marmorek.

=== Running of the WZO ===
The congress had to elect a new president of the group after the death of Herzl, the obvious choice was Nordau but he either refused the position outright or resigned before the next congress in 1907, either way Wolffsohn took up the mantle and moved the headquarters from Vienna to Cologne, though he originally intended to move it to Berlin. The WZO formed the Jewish Colonial Trust to secure funding for the development of towns and agriculture in the Land of Israel.

== Schism ==
As a result of the rejection of the Uganda scheme the Territorialists, led by Zangwill, and some Labor Zionists left the congress, with the Territorialists establishing the Jewish Territorial Organization. The Actions Committee, governing body within the WZO, tried to secure funding to try and implement the Uganda Scheme but the Alliance Israelite Universelle refused on the grounds that land was too unfavorable and the Anglo-Jewish Association rejected the idea because it was too speculative. The lack of funding from these groups spelled the end of the Uganda Scheme as a realistic option.

== Delegates ==
The congress consisted of 736 delegates from 23 countries, including 350 from the Russian Empire, 36 from the United States.

| Notable Delegates | Image | Known for | Role in Congress |
|---|---|---|---|
| Israel Zangwill | | Prominent British Zionist author and notable leader of the Jewish Territorial Organization. | Primary supporter of the Uganda Scheme at the congress. Led the Territorialists in breaking away from the congress. |
| Max Nordau | | Hungarian Jewish Zionist politician, activist, and writer, who was co-founder the WZO. | Major leader of the Diplomatic Zionists, leadership of the WZO was offered to him but he refused. |
| David Wolffsohn | | Lithuanian Jewish Zionist activist and important member of the WZO. | Became the Second president of the WZO after Nordau gave up the role. Also became the president of the Inner Action Committee and the new executive. |
| Menachem Ussishkin | | Russian Zionist, head of the Jewish National Fund,and secretary of the First Zionist Congress. | Primary representative of the Russian Zionists, and supporter of Practical Zionists insettling the Land of Israel. |
| Judah Leon Magnes | | A prominent Reform Rabbi active in America and Israel and a leader of the WW1 era pacifist movement. | Head of the American delegation to the congress. |
