= Dnistrove =

Rural locality in Ternopil Oblast, Ukraine

Dnistrove Дністрове
- Village
- Location in Ternopil Oblast
- Coordinates: 48°32′13″N 26°13′51″E
- Country: Ukraine
- Oblast: Ternopil Oblast
- Raion: Chortkiv Raion
- Hromada: Melnytsia-Podilska settlement hromada
- Time zone: UTC+2 (EET)
  - Summer (DST): UTC+3 (EEST)
- Postal code: 48757

Dnistrove (Ukrainian: Дністрове) is a village in Melnytsia-Podilska settlement hromada, Chortkiv Raion, Ternopil Oblast, Ukraine.

== History ==
The village is known from 1760.

After the liquidation of the Borshchiv Raion on 19 July 2020, the village became part of the Chortkiv Raion.

== Religion ==
- Saint Nicholas church (1996).

== Sources ==
- "Wołkowce (2), «nad Dniesrtrem» wś, pow. borszczowski". Geographical Dictionary of the Kingdom of Poland (in Polish). 13. Warszawa: Kasa im. Józefa Mianowskiego. 1893. p. 873.
