= Oskar Marmorek =

Architect

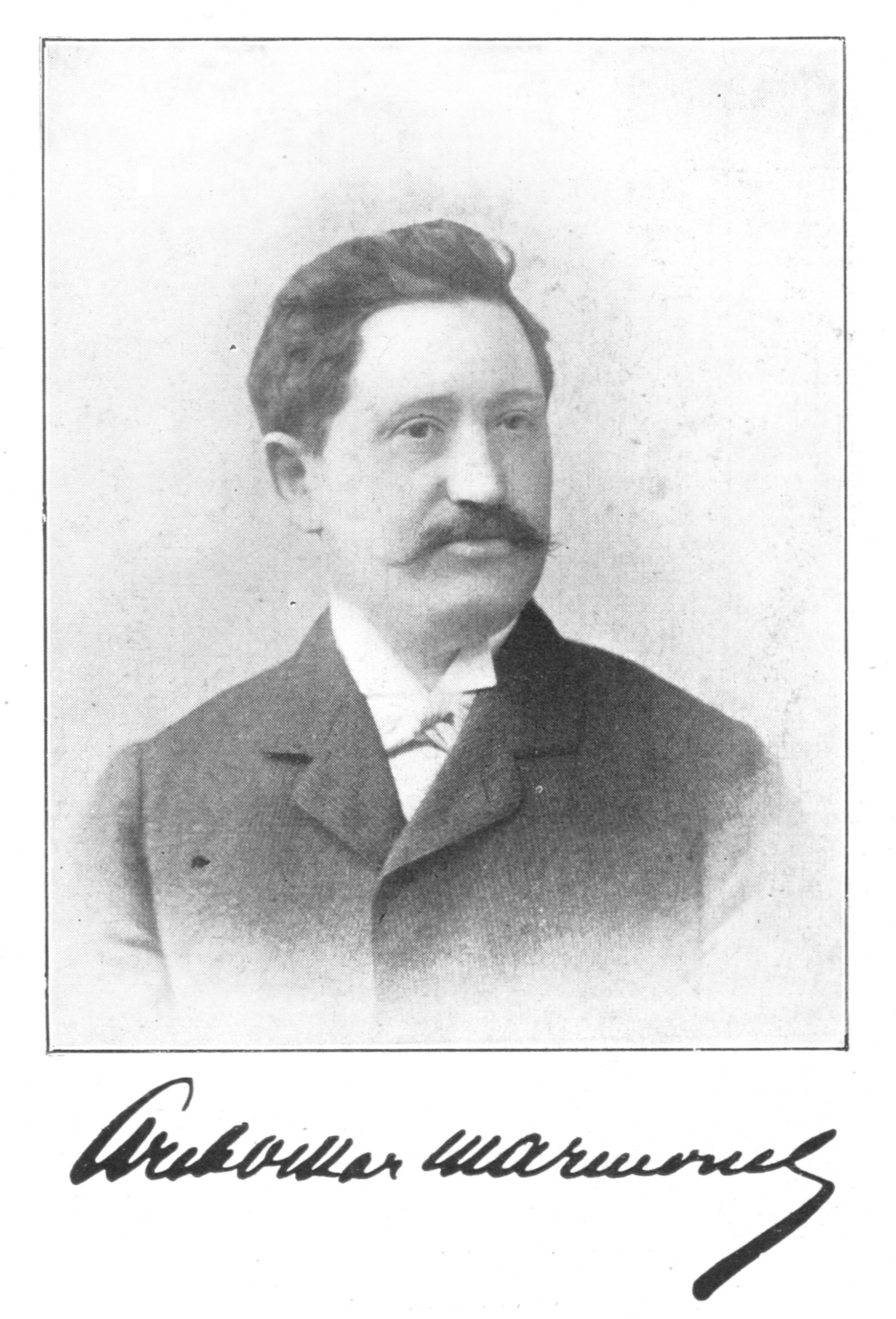
- Born: 9 April 1863; Pieskowa Skała, Galicia, Austria-Hungary
- Died: 7 April 1909 (aged 45); Vienna, Austria-Hungary
- Occupation: Architect
- Buildings: Nestroyhof, Vienna; Rüdigerhof, Vienna
- Projects: Venedig in Wien

Oskar Adolf Marmorek (Hebrew: אוסקר מרמורק; 9 April 1863 – 7 April 1909) was a Galician-born Austro-Hungarian architect and Zionist.

== Early life and training ==
Oskar Marmorek was born in Pieskowa Skała, which in the mid-nineteenth century was part of the region of Galicia at the northern edges of the Austro-Hungarian Empire but is now formally a part of Poland, north of Kraków. He was the eldest of five children in a family that moved several times, eventually settling in Vienna in 1875. Starting in 1880 he attended the architecture section of the Technischen Hochschule (now the Technical University of Vienna; Technische Universität Wien or TU-Wien), where his teachers included the historicist architects Karl König and Rudolf Weyr. He graduated in 1887 and, in partnership with Philipp Herzog, won a competition for a residence building in Cottageviertel, a section of northwest Vienna in the Döbling and Währing districts that had been populated with mostly cottage-like single-family houses since the 1860s and 1870s. He traveled widely and joined the Österreichischer Ingenieur- und Architekten-Verein (Austrian Association of Engineers and Architects).

His brother was French physician and fellow Zionist Alexander Marmorek.

== Architectural career ==
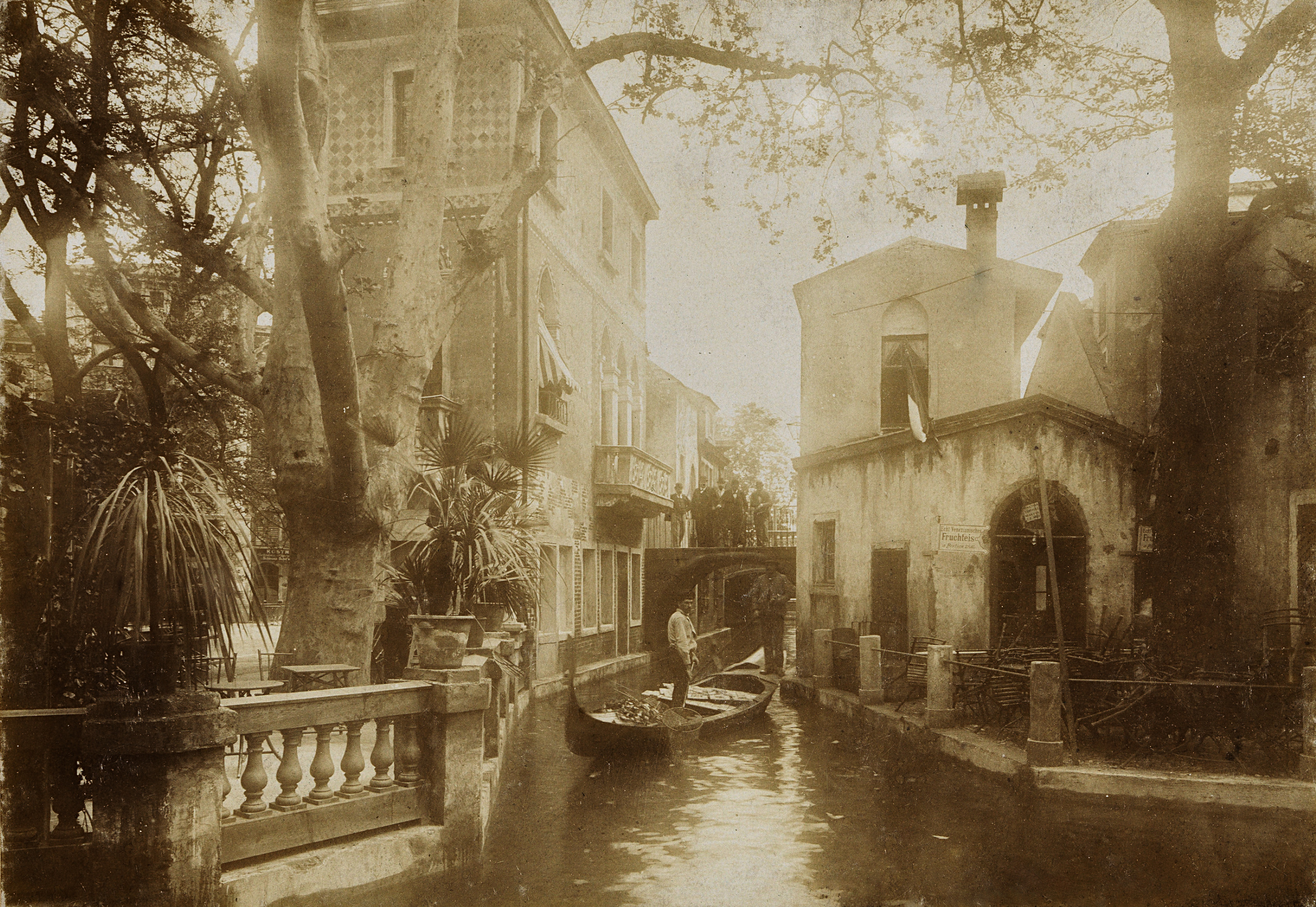
Shot by German photographer Fritz Luckhardt of Venedig in Wien, 1894 or 1895. These buildings were designed by Marmorek.

Marmorek worked at the Exposition Universelle (World's Fair) of 1889 in Paris, where he was duly impressed by a colorfully-lit fountain aptly called the Fontaine Luminuese. Subsequently, he designed a scaled-down version for the park northeast of the city center between the Danube Canal and the Danube River called the Prater, where the 1873 Weltausstellung (World's Fair) had been held. The success of this project meant that he soon became one of the most sought-after exhibition architects in the city, being charged with the design of the exposition Alt-Wien ("Old Vienna"), also located in the Prater. In 1895 he was hired by the theater director Gabor Steiner to design Venedig in Wien ("Venice in Vienna"), one of the world's first theme parks, for which he was repeatedly called on to remodel pavilions whose purposes and amusements frequently changed.

Also beginning in 1895, he also helped distribute the new magazine Neubauten und Concurrenzen in Österreich und Ungarn ("New Buildings and Competitions in Austria and Hungary"), which would soon provide the Wagner School (the students and followers of great Viennese modernist architect Otto Wagner) with a major outlet for the dissemination of their work. Though Marmorek was himself not a student of Wagner, he was happy to make considerable use of Wagner's influence in his later work.

Marmorek married the painter Nelly Schwarz in 1897, and in 1898 Marmorek he built the Nestroyhof in the Leopoldstadt district of Vienna, near the Prater, for his father-in-law Julius Schwarz. In 1902 he completed his most famous structure, an apartment house known as the Rüdigerhof on Hamburgerstraße in the Margareten (5th) district of Vienna.

== Political activism ==
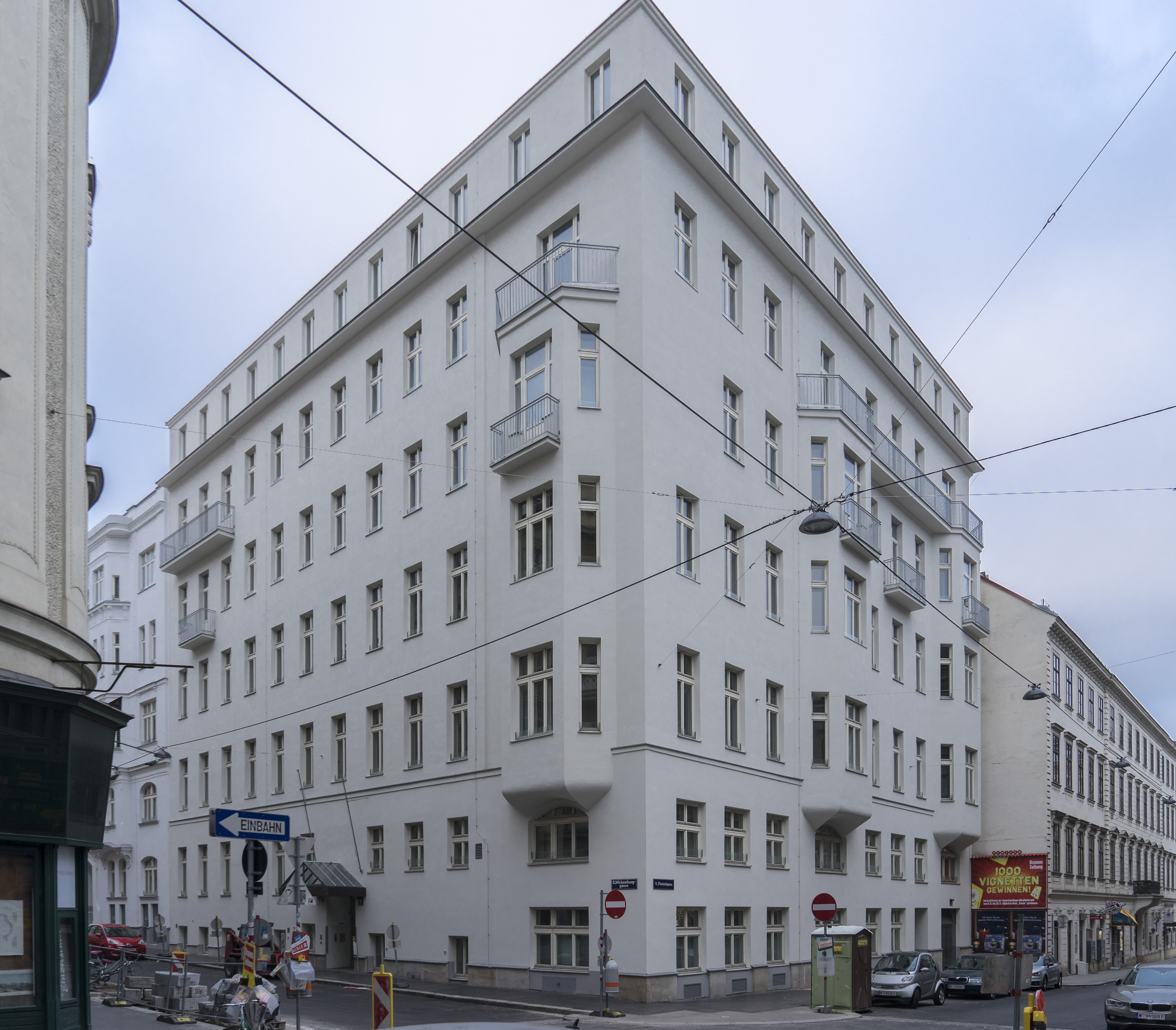
Apartment house by Marmorek at Floriangasse 4, Vienna.

Increasingly after the turn of the century, Marmorek, who was Jewish, became involved with the rising political activism amongst central European Jewry, particularly the idea of founding a permanent Jewish state. In 1895, Marmorek met Theodor Herzl, the Austro-Hungarian Jewish journalist who founded modern political Zionism. The publication of Herzl's book Der Judenstaat in 1896 and the first World Zionist Congress in Basel, which Marmorek organized together with Herzl and Max Nordau in 1897, marked a critical break in his life, as Marmorek then decided to dedicate himself completely to Zionism. At most of the subsequent Zionist congresses Marmorek would give presentations on the development of the movement in different parts of the world. In May 1901, the architect, acting as Secretary of the Actions Committee, traveled to Istanbul with Herzl and David Wolffsohn, Chairman of the Jewish Colonial Trust to meet the Sultan Abdul Hamid II. For his utopian novel Altneuland ("Old New Land"), considered to be one of Zionism's key texts, Herzl modeled the character of Dr Steineck on Marmorek.

In 1903 Marmorek took part in the El-Arisch Expedition, which investigated the suitability of the Sinai Peninsula for the purposes of Jewish settlement, though its recommendations turned out to be unfavorable; as a result, the British government offered an area in what is now Uganda as an alternative. This led, however, to the split of the Zionist movement into the "Old" and "New" camps; the former wanted to seriously study the possibility of a Ugandan homeland and the latter categorically rejected any offer that did not absolutely consider territory in Palestine. Marmorek allied with the "Old" Zionists. Although Herzl had entrusted Marmorek with all architectural matters related to Zionism, he did not like the architect's plan for a convention center in Basel, and drafted his own plan instead.

After Herzl's death in 1904, Marmorek was appointed by the Greater Actions Committee of the World Zionist Organization to act as chairman until the election of David Wolffsohn as new president in 1905. He was also elected to the board of the Israelitische Kultusgemeinde Wien (IKG; the Vienna Israelite Community), which represents the city's Orthodox Jewish population.

== Death ==
Despite his prominence in the Zionist movement, Marmorek suffered from depression, which intensified along with his other health problems after Herzl's death and those of several of his other friends after the turn of the century. In 1909 he died of a self-inflicted gunshot wound at the grave of his father in the Vienna Central Cemetery, where he is also interred in the old Israelite section (1st Gate, Group 20, Row 17b, Number 5). His resting place is marked by a prominent modern tombstone.

== Works ==
Name	Photo	Description	Reference	Year built	Address
Villa Wrchovszky in Grinzing				1890	Wien 19
Ausstellung Alt Wien		Tonhalle und Schattentheater "Alt Wien" (Der Hohe Markt vor der zweiten Türkenbelagerung). Tonhalle und Schattentheater für die Int. Musik- und Theaterausstellung		1892	Prater, Wien 2
"Internationales Dorf" für die Ausstellung für Volksernährung, Armeeverpflegung, Rettungswesen und Verkehrsmittel		Wettbewerb 1. Preis		1894	Wien 9
Villa				1895	Löver krt., Sopron, Hungary
Villa Goldberger				1895	Unterach am Attersee, Austria

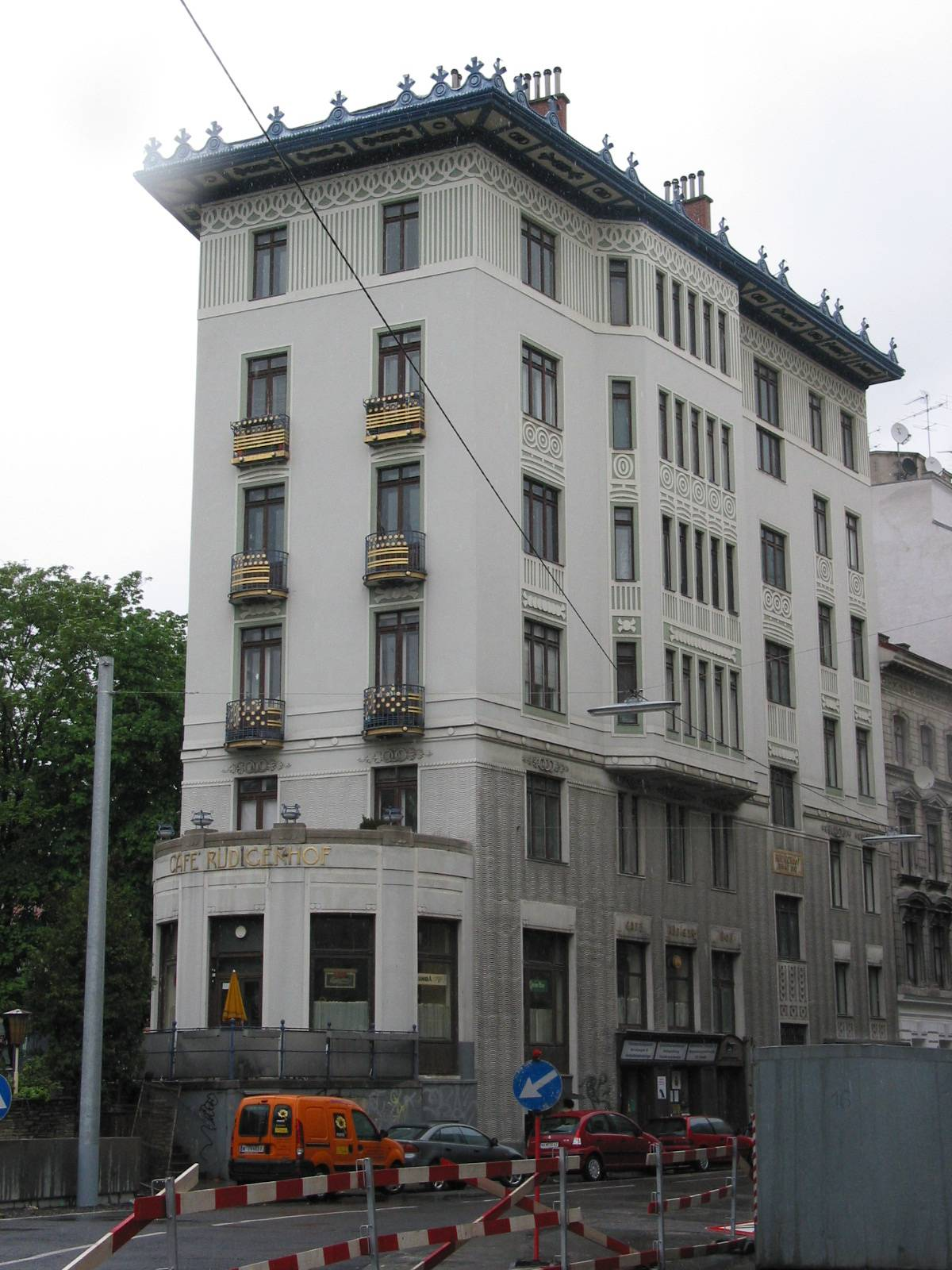
Rüdigerhof

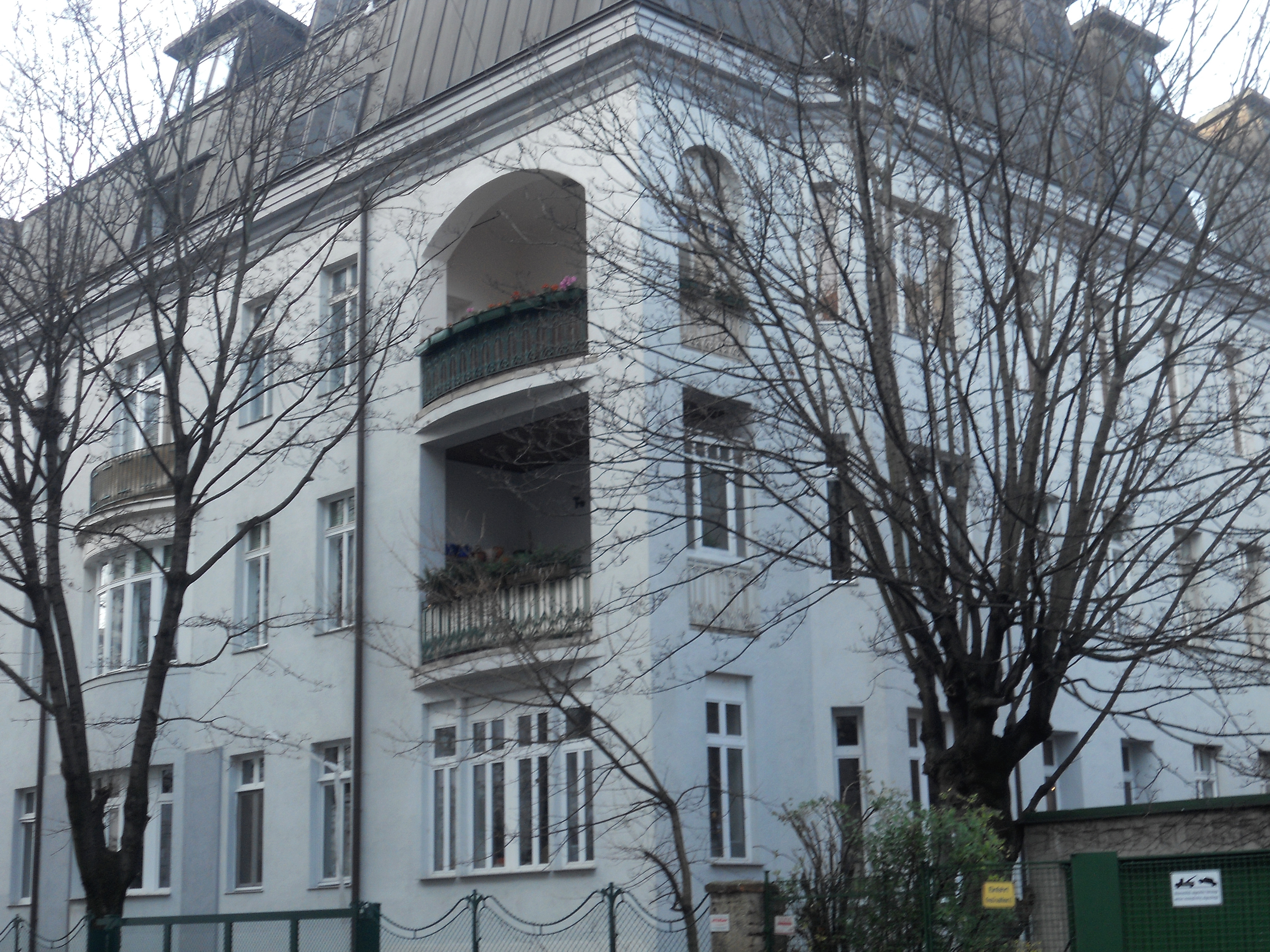
Boecklinstr59

- Exhibition Alt-Wien, 1894
- Venedig in Wien, 1895
- Villa and Palais Egyedi, Budapest, 1896
- Annex Sanatorium in Zuckmantel (Czech: Zlaté Hory), 1897
- Nestroyhof, Wien, 1898
- Rüdigerhof, Wien, 1902
- Windmühlgasse 32, Wien, 1902
