= Vladyslav Kaskiv =

Ukrainian businessman and former politician

- Владислав Каськів
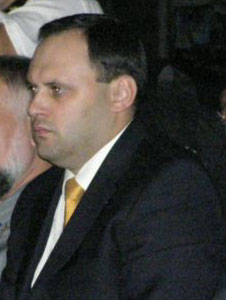
- Kaskiv in 2007

Member of the Zakarpattia Oblast Council
- Incumbent
- Assumed office 10 November 2020
- Constituency: OPZZh, No. 6

People's Deputy of Ukraine
- In office 23 November 2007 – 23 February 2012
- Constituency: NUNS, No. 31

Personal details
- Born: 1 December 1973 (age 52) Melnytsia-Podilska, Ukrainian SSR, Soviet Union (now Ukraine)
- Party: Opposition Platform — For Life (2020–present)
- Other political affiliations: PORA; Our Ukraine–People's Self-Defense Bloc

Vladyslav Volodymyrovych Kaskiv (Ukrainian: Владислав Володимирович Каськів; born 1 December 1973) is a Ukrainian businessman and politician currently serving as a member of the Zakarpattia Oblast Council from the proportional list of Opposition Platform — For Life since 2020. He previously served as a People's Deputy of Ukraine from the proportional list of Our Ukraine–People's Self-Defense Bloc from 2007 to 2012, and helped to organise the 2004 Orange Revolution.

== Early life, education and activism ==
Kaskiv was born on 1 December 1973 in the city of Melnytsia-Podilska, in Ukraine's western Ternopil Oblast.

=== Education ===
In 1990-1991, he studied at the Junior College of Fedkovych State University in Chernivtsi. In 1991, he enrolled in the History Department at the same university. Starting in 2004, he continued his studies at the History Department of Dragomanov National Pedagogical University, and in 2006, he received a specialist degree.

From 2007 to 2010, he studied at the Faculty of Senior Management, majoring in "Social Development Management," at the National Academy of Public Administration under the President of Ukraine. In February 2010, he defended his master’s thesis on "Principles and Stages of Reform in the Field of Public Administration" and received a master's degree in Social Development Management.

Since 1994 he has been known for his social and political activity in Ukraine. He has acted as an advisor to the Minister of Economy, advisor to the President, World Bank contact group member in 2001 and was a coordinator of PORA's civic campaign, which played the key role in organizing the Orange Revolution.

== Political career ==
In the 2006 Ukrainian parliamentary election Kaskiv failed to win a seat in the Verkhovna Rada (Ukrainian parliament) in an alliance with his PORA and the Reforms and Order Party.

In the 2007 Ukrainian parliamentary election Kaskiv was elected as a People's Deputy of Ukraine from the proportional list of the Our Ukraine–People's Self-Defense Bloc During his tenure, he was an adviser to Prime Minister Yulia Tymoshenko on foreign investment. He resigned on 23 February 2012 after becoming head of the State Agency for Investment in Main National Projects of Ukraine, on appointment by President Viktor Yanukovych.

Kaskiv fled Ukraine following the 2014 Revolution of Dignity, and served as head of Ozario, an Austrian investment company.

In the 2020 Ukrainian local elections Kaskiv was elected member of the Zakarpattia Oblast Council for Opposition Platform — For Life (he was number six on its election list).

== Embezzlement scandal ==
Kaskiv was involved in an embezzlement scandal, centred around his time as director of the Ukraine State Investment Agency between 2010 and 2014. In March 2016, Kaskiv was declared wanted. He was suspected of having embezzled ₴7.5. million ($279,000) from the state budget, working alongside others.

After being arrested, on October 3, 2016, Kaskiiv posted bail of $600,000 and was released. On the same day, the Pecherskyi District Court of Kyiv released Kaskiiv on bail of 160,000 hryvnias and ordered him to surrender all his foreign passports.

He was arrested in Panama and extradited in order to stand trial in 2017. On November 1, 2017, he returned to Ukraine from Panama after submitting a request for voluntary extradition.

== Recognition ==
- Gold Medal from Slovak Government for international contribution to Democracy development (February, 2005)
- Award for achievement of the Hleytsman Foundation (December 2004, US)
- The memorial sign "Outstanding member of the Orange Revolution"
- "Person of the Year - 2005" in the category "Public Leader of the Year"

== Family ==
- Former wife (since 1996): Olena Hantsiak.
  - Son Maksym (born 1996)
- Civil wife (2007–2008): Tetyana Volodymyrivna Danilenko, journalist.
  - Daughter Khrystyna (born 2008)
