= Mykhailivka, Chortkiv Raion, Ternopil Oblast =

Rural locality in Ternopil Oblast, Ukraine

Mykhailivka Михайлівка
- Village
- Location in Ternopil Oblast
- Coordinates: 48°36′23″N 26°15′27″E
- Country: Ukraine
- Oblast: Ternopil Oblast
- Raion: Chortkiv Raion
- Hromada: Melnytsia-Podilska settlement hromada
- Time zone: UTC+2 (EET)
  - Summer (DST): UTC+3 (EEST)
- Postal code: 48750

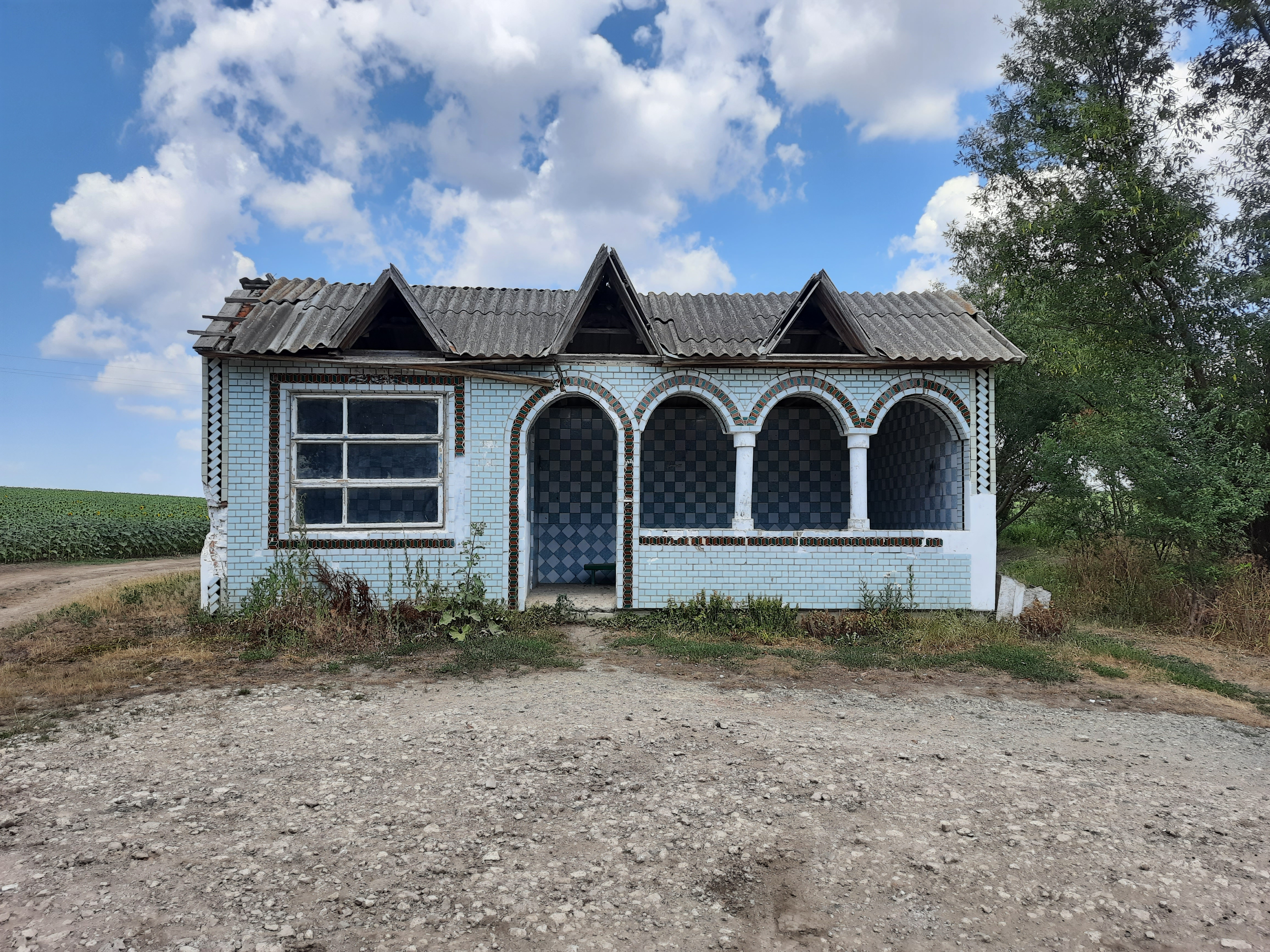
Bus stop. Mykhailivka village, Chortkiv district, Ternopil region

Mykhailivka (Ukrainian: Михайлівка) is a village in Melnytsia-Podilska settlement hromada, Chortkiv Raion, Ternopil Oblast, Ukraine.

== History ==
The first written mention dates from 1403.

After the liquidation of the Borshchiv Raion on 19 July 2020, the village became part of the Chortkiv Raion.

== Religion ==
- Church of the Intercession (1854, brick, UGCC),
- Roman Catholic church (19th century).

== Sources ==
- (in Ukrainian) Ковальков, Ю., Михайлівка // Ternopil Encyclopedic Dictionary: in 4 v. / editorial board: H. Yavorskyi and other, Ternopil: "Zbruch", 2005, V. 2: К—О, S. 520. — ISBN 966-528-199-2.
- "Michałówka (13)". Geographical Dictionary of the Kingdom of Poland (in Polish). 6. Warszawa: Kasa im. Józefa Mianowskiego. 1885. p. 307—308.
