= Zavallia, Ternopil Oblast =

Rural locality in Ternopil Oblast, Ukraine

Zavallia Завалля
- Village
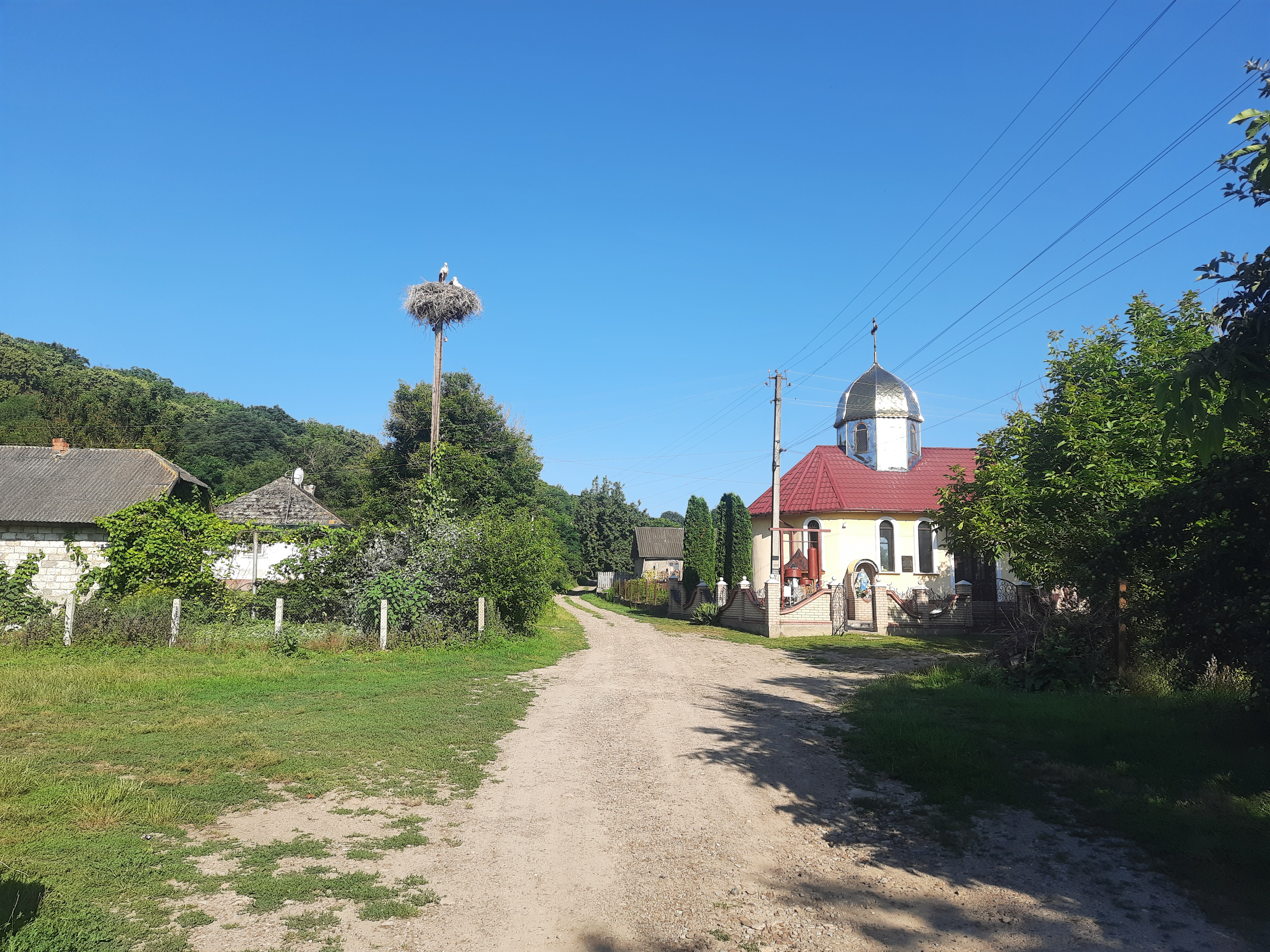
- Zavallia center

- Location in Ternopil Oblast
- Coordinates: 48°35′9″N 26°18′46″E
- Country: Ukraine
- Oblast: Ternopil Oblast
- Raion: Chortkiv Raion
- Hromada: Melnytsia-Podilska settlement hromada
- Time zone: UTC+2 (EET)
  - Summer (DST): UTC+3 (EEST)
- Postal code: 48753

Zavallia (Ukrainian: Завалля, Polish: Zawałów) is a village in Melnytsia-Podilska settlement hromada, Chortkiv Raion, Ternopil Oblast, Ukraine. It sits on the Prut River, immediately adjacent to the historical border of Bukovina.

== History ==
Known from the 16th century.

After the liquidation of the Borshchiv Raion on 19 July 2020, the village became part of the Chortkiv Raion.

== Religion ==
- Chapel of the Intercession (2012, UGCC).

== Sources ==
- "Zawale (1), wieś, pow. borszczowski". Geographical Dictionary of the Kingdom of Poland (in Polish). 14. Warszawa: Kasa im. Józefa Mianowskiego. 1895. p. 483.
