= Mykhalkiv, Ternopil Oblast =

Rural locality in Ternopil Oblast, Ukraine

Mykhalkiv Михалків
- Village
- Location in Ternopil Oblast
- Coordinates: 48°37′37″N 26°5′18″E
- Country: Ukraine
- Oblast: Ternopil Oblast
- Raion: Chortkiv Raion
- Hromada: Melnytsia-Podilska settlement hromada
- Time zone: UTC+2 (EET)
  - Summer (DST): UTC+3 (EEST)
- Postal code: 48747

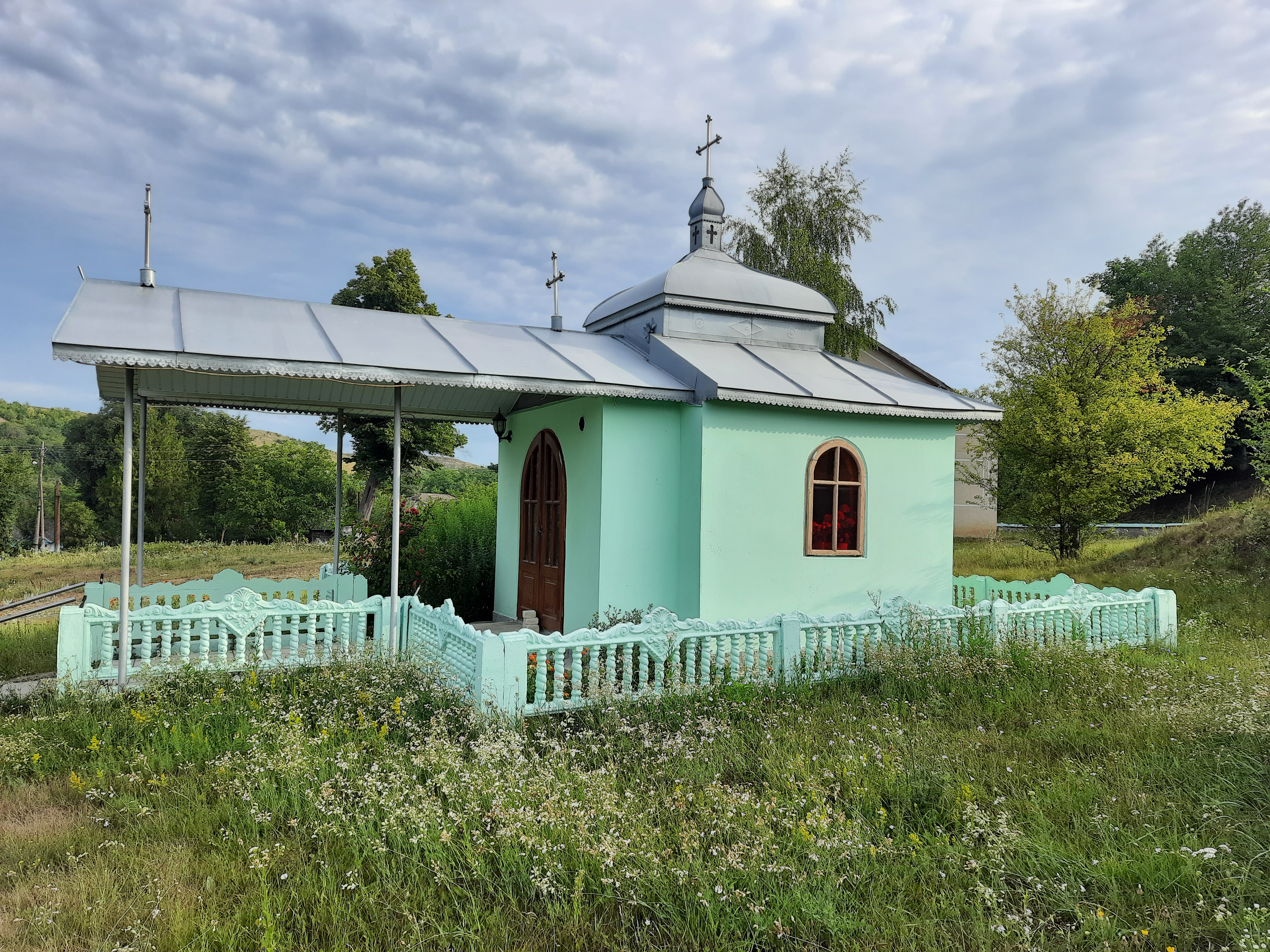
Mykhalkiv chapel in 2004

Mykhalkiv (Ukrainian: Михалків) is a village in Melnytsia-Podilska settlement hromada, Chortkiv Raion, Ternopil Oblast, Ukraine.

== History ==
Two treasures were found near the village, which were later named the Mykhalkivskyi treasures.

The first documentary mention is dated 1439.

After the liquidation of the Borshchiv Raion on 19 July 2020, the village became part of the Chortkiv Raion.

== Religion ==
- Saint Nicholas church (1772).

== Sources ==
- (in Ukrainian) Сохацький М., Михалків // Ternopil Encyclopedic Dictionary: in 4 v. / editorial board: H. Yavorskyi and other, Ternopil: "Zbruch", 2005, V. 2: К—О, S. 521-522. — ISBN 966-528-199-2.
- "Michałków (2) wś. pow. borszczowski". Geographical Dictionary of the Kingdom of Poland (in Polish). 6. Warszawa: Kasa im. Józefa Mianowskiego. 1885. p. 298.
