= Melnytsia-Podilska =

Rural locality in Ternopil Oblast, Ukraine

Melnytsia-Podilska Мельниця-Подільська Mielnica Podolska
- Rural settlement
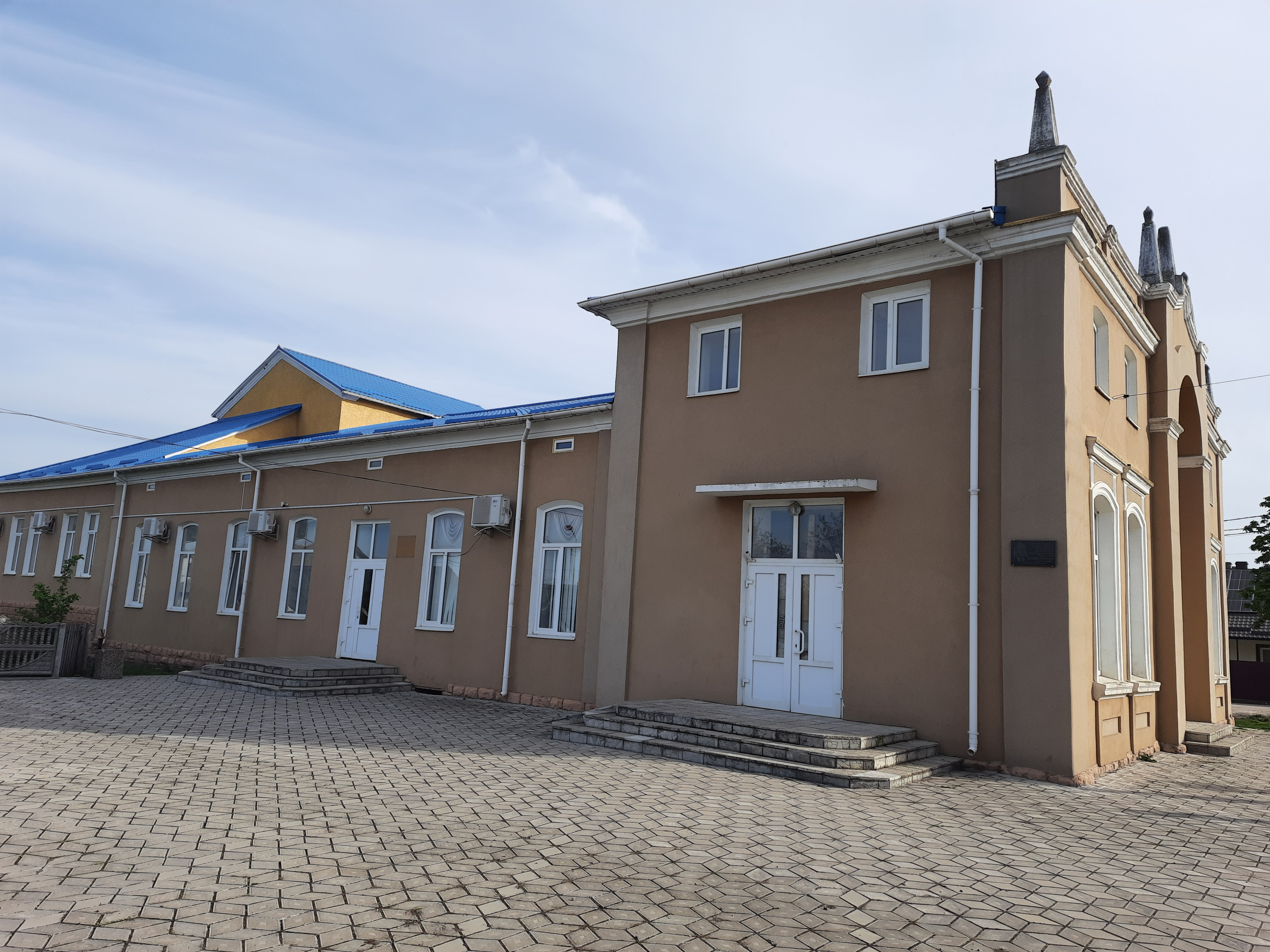
- House of Culture in Melnytsia-Podilska

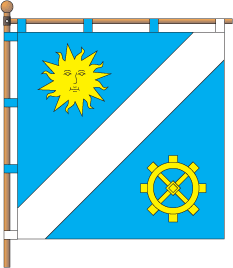
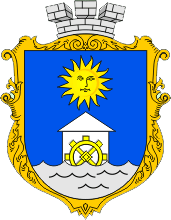
- Flag Coat of arms
- Interactive map of Melnytsia-Podilska
- Location of Melnytsia-Podilska in Ternopil Oblast Location of Melnytsia-Podilska in Ukraine
- Coordinates: 48°36′22″N 26°10′55″E
- Country: Ukraine
- Oblast: Ternopil Oblast
- Raion: Chortkiv Raion
- Hromada: Melnytsia-Podilska settlement hromada
- Magdeburg rights: 1747
- Town status: 1960

Area
  - Total: 10 km^{2} (3.9 sq mi)
- Elevation: 260 m (850 ft)

Population (2022)
  - Total: 3,596
  - Density: 360/km^{2} (930/sq mi)
- Time zone: UTC+2 (EET)
  - Summer (DST): UTC+3 (EEST)
- Postal code: 48751
- Area code: +380 3541
- Website: rada.gov.ua

Melnytsia-Podilska (Ukrainian: Мельниця-Подільська; Polish: Mielnica; Yiddish: מילניצע, romanized: Melnitse), previously known as Melnytsia-nad-Dnistrom (Ukrainian: Мельниця-над-Днiстром) until 1940, is a rural settlement in Chortkiv Raion, Ternopil Oblast, western Ukraine. It hosts the administration of Melnytsia-Podilska settlement hromada, one of the hromadas of Ukraine. Population: 3,596 (2022 estimate).

The settlement is located in the southernmost part of the province, on the left bank of the Dnister River. To the north is the Khudykovtsi village, and 1.5 kilometres (0.93 mi) to the south is the settlement of Vilkhovets. On the opposite bank of the Dnister lies the village of Perebykivtsi in Dniester Raion, Chernivtsi Oblast. The Ukrainian automobile road T-2002 runs through the town.

== History ==
The town of Melnytsia was first mentioned in the 11th century, which was soon destroyed during the Mongol invasion of Rus'. From 1362, the settlement was in the possession of the Koriatovych family. From the end of the 16th century, Lanckoroński magnates ruled the territory. Ever since the 17th century, the settlement was known as Melnytsia-nad-Dnistrom (or Melnytsia-upon-the-Dnister). In 1747, the town was granted Magdeburg rights. Later in that century, the territory changed hands, to be controlled by the Dunin-Borkowski grafs.

Since ancient times, windmills were spaced throughout the settlement, a prime location situated on the slopes of the Dniester River, hence the name "Melnytsia," or windmill in Ukrainian. In order to distinguish from other settlements named "Melnytsia," the ending -Podilska was added in 1940. In 1960, Melnytsia-Podilska was upgraded to that of an urban-type settlement.

Until 18 July 2020, Melnytsia-Podilska belonged to Borshchiv Raion. The raion was abolished in July 2020 as part of the administrative reform of Ukraine, which reduced the number of raions of Ternopil Oblast to three. The area of Borshchiv Raion was merged into Chortkiv Raion. On 26 January 2024, a new law entered into force which abolished the status of urban-type settlement, and Melnytsia-Podilska became a rural settlement.

== Attractions ==
St. Michael's Church

- Saint Michael's Church, a modest stone church built in 1772 and restored in 1989.
- Remains of the Neo-Gothic Dunin-Borkowski Palace, built in the 19th century (now destroyed).

== People from Melnytsia-Podilska ==
- Alexander Marmorek (1865), physician, bacteriologist at the Pasteur Institute and zionist since the First Zionist Congress.
- Petro Kasinchuk (1929), Ukrainian statesman, Ukrainian Insurgent Army member.
- Vladyslav Kaskiv (born 1973), Our Ukraine–People's Self-Defense lawmaker, former leader of the PORA civic youth organization, former member of parliament.
