= Horoshova =

Rural locality in Ternopil Oblast, Ukraine

Horoshova Горошова
- Village
- Location in Ternopil Oblast
- Coordinates: 48°32′42″N 26°6′15″E
- Country: Ukraine
- Oblast: Ternopil Oblast
- Raion: Chortkiv Raion
- Hromada: Melnytsia-Podilska settlement hromada
- Time zone: UTC+2 (EET)
  - Summer (DST): UTC+3 (EEST)
- Postal code: 48756

Horoshova (Ukrainian: Горошова) is a village in Melnytsia-Podilska settlement hromada, Chortkiv Raion, Ternopil Oblast, Ukraine.

Every year, in early January, the village organizes Malanka processions. Nowadays, the Malanka theatrical festivals are held, with participants from different regions of Ukraine and foreign countries.

== History ==
The first written mention dates from 1470.

After the liquidation of the Borshchiv Raion on 19 July 2020, the village became part of the Chortkiv Raion.

== Religion ==
- Two churches of St. Paraskeva (1798, brick, reconstructed in 1888 and 1985; UGCC; 1991, built in the Cossack Baroque style by the Dutkevychs; OCU).

== Sources ==
- "Horoszowa, pow. borszczowski". Geographical Dictionary of the Kingdom of Poland (in Polish). 3. Warszawa: Kasa im. Józefa Mianowskiego. 1882. p. 153.
