= Zbruchanske =

Village in Ternopil Oblast, Ukraine

Zbruchanske Збручанське
- Village
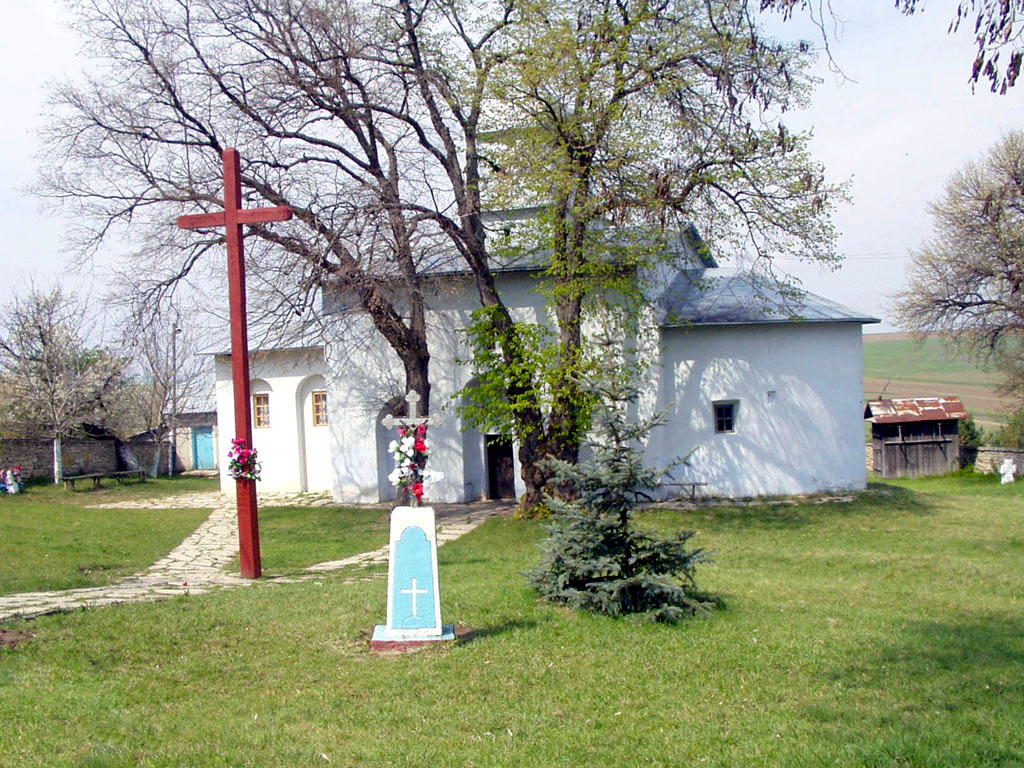
- Church of the Translation of the Relics of Saint Nicholas

- Location in Ternopil Oblast
- Coordinates: 48°39′44″N 26°16′18″E
- Country: Ukraine
- Oblast: Ternopil Oblast
- Raion: Chortkiv Raion
- Hromada: Melnytsia-Podilska Hromada
- Time zone: UTC+2 (EET)
  - Summer (DST): UTC+3 (EEST)
- Postal code: 48745

Zbruchanske (Ukrainian: Збручанське) is a village in Melnytsia-Podilska settlement hromada, Chortkiv Raion, Ternopil Oblast, Ukraine.

Near the village there is a natural monument of local importance – Zbruchanska karst cave.

== History ==
The first written mention dates back to 1393.

After the liquidation of the Borshchiv Raion on 19 July 2020, the village became part of the Chortkiv Raion.

== Religion ==
- Church of the Translation of the Relics of Saint Nicholas (13th century, brick, rebuilt in 1611, restored in 1990; architectural monuments of national importance). The oldest church in the Ternopil Oblat.
- Roman Catholic church (1731).
- chapel.

== Sources ==
- (in Ukrainian) Савіцька Л., Уніят, В., Збручанське // Ternopil Encyclopedic Dictionary: in 4 v. / editorial board: H. Yavorskyi and other, Ternopil: "Zbruch", 2004, V. 1: А—Й, S. 641. — ISBN 966-528-197-6.
- "Nowosiółka (5)". Geographical Dictionary of the Kingdom of Poland (in Polish). 7. Warszawa: Kasa im. Józefa Mianowskiego. 1886. p. 277.
