= Latkivtsi =

Rural locality in Ternopil Oblast, Ukraine

Latkivtsi Латківці
- Village
- Location in Ternopil Oblast
- Coordinates: 48°33′18″N 26°16′51″E
- Country: Ukraine
- Oblast: Ternopil Oblast
- Raion: Chortkiv Raion
- Hromada: Melnytsia-Podilska settlement hromada
- Time zone: UTC+2 (EET)
  - Summer (DST): UTC+3 (EEST)
- Postal code: 48755

Latkivtsi (Ukrainian: Латківці) is a village in Melnytsia-Podilska settlement hromada, Chortkiv Raion, Ternopil Oblast, Ukraine.

== History ==
It is known from 1780.

After the liquidation of the Borshchiv Raion on 19 July 2020, the village became part of the Chortkiv Raion.

== Religion ==
- Church of the Annunciation of the Blessed Virgin Mary (1785, brick, UGCC).

== Sources ==
- (in Ukrainian) Мельничук І., Уніят В., Латківці // Ternopil Encyclopedic Dictionary: in 4 v. / editorial board: H. Yavorskyi and other, Ternopil: "Zbruch", 2005, V. 2: К—О, S. 325. — ISBN 966-528-199-2.
- "Łatkowce". Geographical Dictionary of the Kingdom of Poland (in Polish). 5. Warszawa: Kasa im. Józefa Mianowskiego. 1884. p. 608.
- "Łatkowce". Geographical Dictionary of the Kingdom of Poland (in Polish). p. 258.
