= Trubchyn =

Rural locality in Ternopil Oblast, Ukraine

Trubchyn Трубчин
- Village
- Location in Ternopil Oblast
- Coordinates: 48°30′50″N 26°18′39″E
- Country: Ukraine
- Oblast: Ternopil Oblast
- Raion: Chortkiv Raion
- Hromada: Melnytsia-Podilska settlement hromada
- Time zone: UTC+2 (EET)
  - Summer (DST): UTC+3 (EEST)
- Postal code: 48758

Trubchyn (Ukrainian: Трубчин) is a village in Melnytsia-Podilska settlement hromada, Chortkiv Raion, Ternopil Oblast, Ukraine.

== History ==
It is known from the 15th century.

After the liquidation of the Borshchiv Raion on 19 July 2020, the village became part of the Chortkiv Raion.

== Religion ==
- Saint Nicholas church (1857, brick).

== Sources ==
- (in Ukrainian) Хаварівський Б., Ханас, В., Трубчин // Ternopil Encyclopedic Dictionary: in 4 v. / editorial board: H. Yavorskyi and other, Ternopil: "Zbruch", 2008, V. 3: П—Я, S. 473. — ISBN 978-966-528-279-2.
- "Trubczyn". Geographical Dictionary of the Kingdom of Poland (in Polish). 12. Warszawa: Kasa im. Józefa Mianowskiego. 1892. p. 515.
