= Church of the Translation of the Relics of Saint Nicholas, Zbruchanske =

Church in Ternopil Oblast, Ukraine

Church of the Translation of the Relics of Saint Nicholas
- Церква Перенесення Мощей Святого Миколая
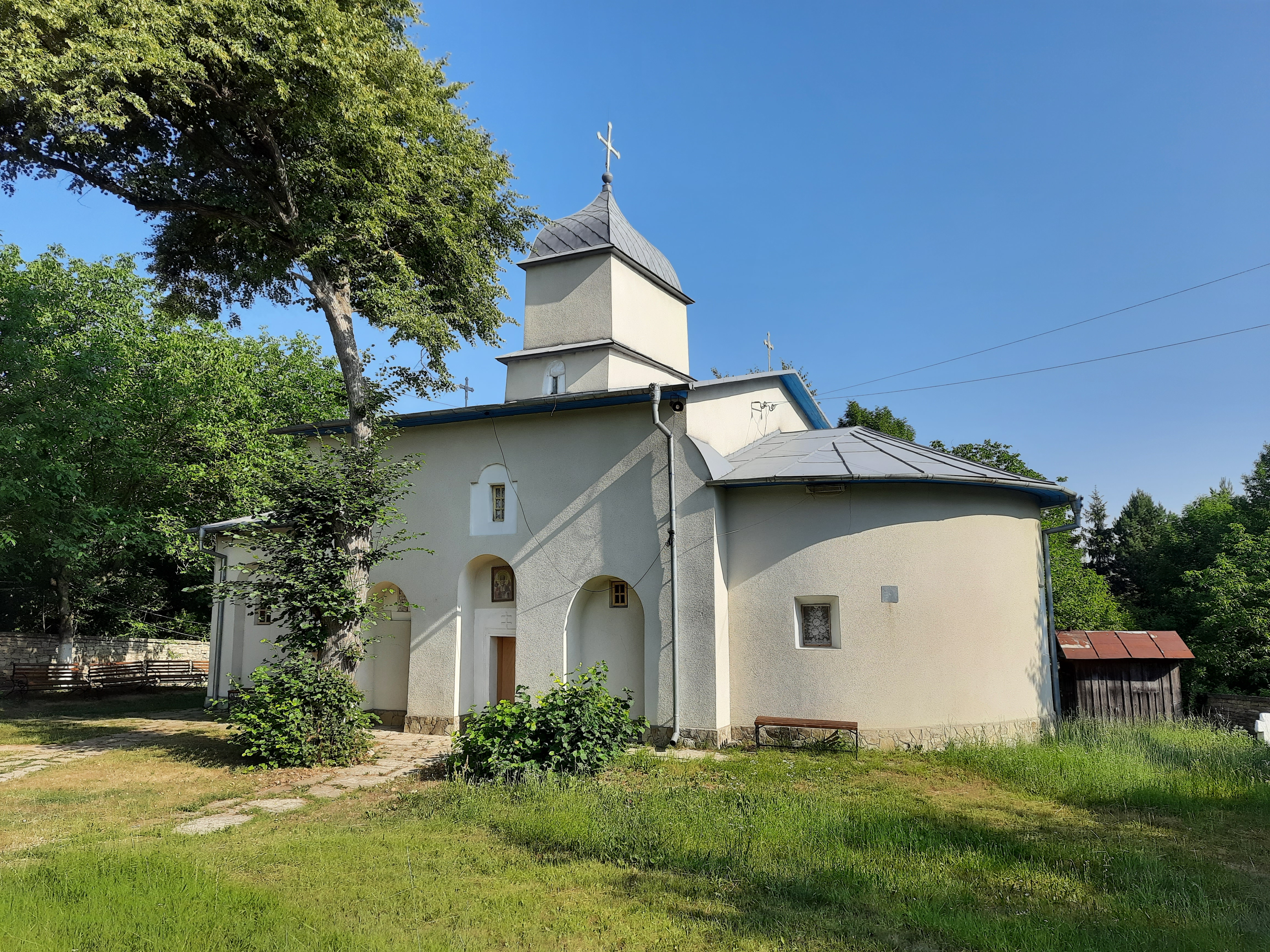

- Location within Ternopil Oblast

Religion
- Affiliation: Orthodox Church of Ukraine

Location
- Location: Zbruchanske
- Coordinates: 48°39′59.60″N 26°15′32″E

Church of the Translation of the Relics of Saint Nicholas (Ukrainian: Церква Перенесення Мощей Святого Миколая) is a stone church belonging to the Orthodox Church of Ukraine and recognized as an architectural monument of national importance, located in the village of Zbruchanske, Chortkiv Raion, Ternopil Oblast. It is one of the best-preserved and rarest examples of stone church architecture in Podillia, dating back to the second half of the 14th – early 15th centuries.

== History and dating ==
The church in Zbruchanske is one of the few stone buildings that survived in Ukraine after the princely era, when social and political circumstances were not conducive to the active development of monumental construction. Available sources, including an inscription about the restoration in 1611 and references in visitation acts of the 18th century, confirm its ancient origin.

According to comprehensive scientific research conducted by Yurii Dubyk and other experts, the temple dates back to the late 14th – early 15th centuries. This dating is based on a detailed analysis of architectural forms and is supported by indirect archaeological evidence. In particular, the discovery of a silver ternary coin from the time of Władysław II Jagiełło (minted between 1386 and 1403) near the monument serves as an additional argument in favor of the established chronological period.

=== Researchers of the monument ===
The first to pay serious attention to this monument were researchers Aleksander Czołowski and Bohdan Janusz, who, based on oral accounts and the fact of its restoration in 1611, dated it to at least the 16th century and noted the influence of Wallachian architecture on its design. In the 1970s, the church was rediscovered by Lviv art historians Petro Lipynskyi and priest Volodymyr Yarema. Later, in 1985–1986, a group of employees of the Research Institute of Theory and History of Architecture and Urban Planning in Kyiv, led by Doctor of Art History Hryhorii Lohvyn, conducted a historical and architectural study, which concluded that the church was built at the end of the 14th century and its uniqueness as one of the oldest structures in Podillia, combining the traditions of Old Ruthenian, Gothic, and folk wooden architecture.

== Architectural features ==
Structurally, the St. Nicholas Church is a single-nave pillarless temple with one apse. Its architectural design is unique for Podillia at that time, as it demonstrates a complex synthesis of different building traditions. The most important structural feature of the church is its ability to bear the load from the vault not through the solid thickness of the walls, but thanks to a system of buttresses built directly into the thickness of the walls of the nave.

This decision indicates the transitional nature of the architecture, which combined Rus' traditions of stone construction with elements of Western Gothic (as evidenced by the pointed tops of windows and doors) and local folk wooden architecture. In addition, the architecture of the church reflects the influence of Balkan construction (Moldavia, Wallachia, Bulgaria), which is a consequence of the close political and religious contacts between the Ukrainian lands and southeastern Europe.

== Reconstruction of the original appearance ==
The scientific value of the temple increased significantly after comprehensive research conducted by the State Institute "Ukrproiectrestavratsiia" in 1989. This work allowed for the formation of a new, scientifically based hypothesis regarding the original appearance of the monument, which differed significantly from its current state.

It has been established that the church was originally covered with a gable roof, which was covered with ceramic tiles, fragments of which were found during excavations. In addition, the rectangular drum of the temple protruded into the outer space and was crowned with a high hipped or helmet-shaped top. These findings formed the basis for the development of a reconstruction project aimed at restoring the authentic appearance of this rare monument.
