= Panivtsi, Ternopil Oblast =

Rural locality in Ternopil Oblast, Ukraine

Panivtsi Панівці
- Village
- Location in Ternopil Oblast
- Coordinates: 48°34′45″N 26°18′46″E
- Country: Ukraine
- Oblast: Ternopil Oblast
- Raion: Chortkiv Raion
- Hromada: Melnytsia-Podilska settlement hromada
- Time zone: UTC+2 (EET)
  - Summer (DST): UTC+3 (EEST)
- Postal code: 48753

Panivtsi (Ukrainian: Панівці) is a village in Melnytsia-Podilska settlement hromada, Chortkiv Raion, Ternopil Oblast, Ukraine.

== History ==
The first written mention is from 1447.

After the liquidation of the Borshchiv Raion on 19 July 2020, the village became part of the Chortkiv Raion.

== Religion ==
- Saint James church (1853, brick).

== Sources ==
- (in Ukrainian) Уніят В., Панівці // Ternopil Encyclopedic Dictionary: in 4 v. / editorial board: H. Yavorskyi and other, Ternopil: "Zbruch", 2008, V. 3: П—Я, S. 23. — ISBN 978-966-528-279-2.
- "Paniowce Zielone, wś, pow. borszczowski". Geographical Dictionary of the Kingdom of Poland (in Polish). 7. Warszawa: Kasa im. Józefa Mianowskiego. 1886. p. 841.
