= Dzvyniachka =

Rural locality in Ternopil Oblast, Ukraine

Dzvyniachka Дзвинячка
- Village
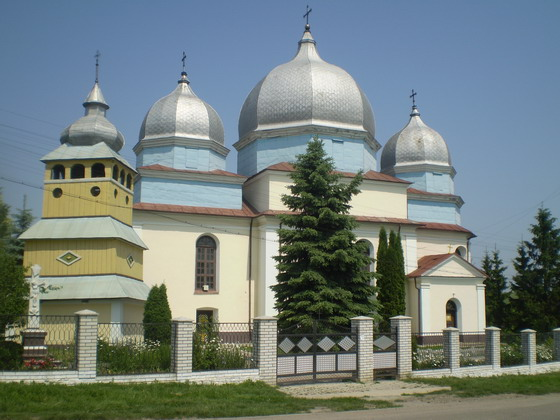
- Church of the Holy Trinity

- Location in Ternopil Oblast
- Coordinates: 48°34′53″N 26°15′0″E
- Country: Ukraine
- Oblast: Ternopil Oblast
- Raion: Chortkiv Raion
- Hromada: Melnytsia-Podilska settlement hromada
- Time zone: UTC+2 (EET)
  - Summer (DST): UTC+3 (EEST)
- Postal code: 48755

Dzvyniachka (Ukrainian: Дзвинячка) is a village in Melnytsia-Podilska settlement hromada, Chortkiv Raion, Ternopil Oblast, Ukraine.

== History ==
The first written mention dates from 1431.

After the liquidation of the Borshchiv Raion on 19 July 2020, the village became part of the Chortkiv Raion.

== Religion ==
- Church of the Holy Trinity (1884, stone, restored in 1998)
- Roman Catholic church (early 19th century, donated by the Koziebrodski counts)

== Sources ==
- "Dźwiniaczka". Geographical Dictionary of the Kingdom of Poland (in Polish). 2. Warszawa: Kasa im. Józefa Mianowskiego. 1881. p. 310.
