= Dzvenyhorod =

Rural locality in Ternopil Oblast, Ukraine

Dzvenyhorod Дзвенигород
- Village
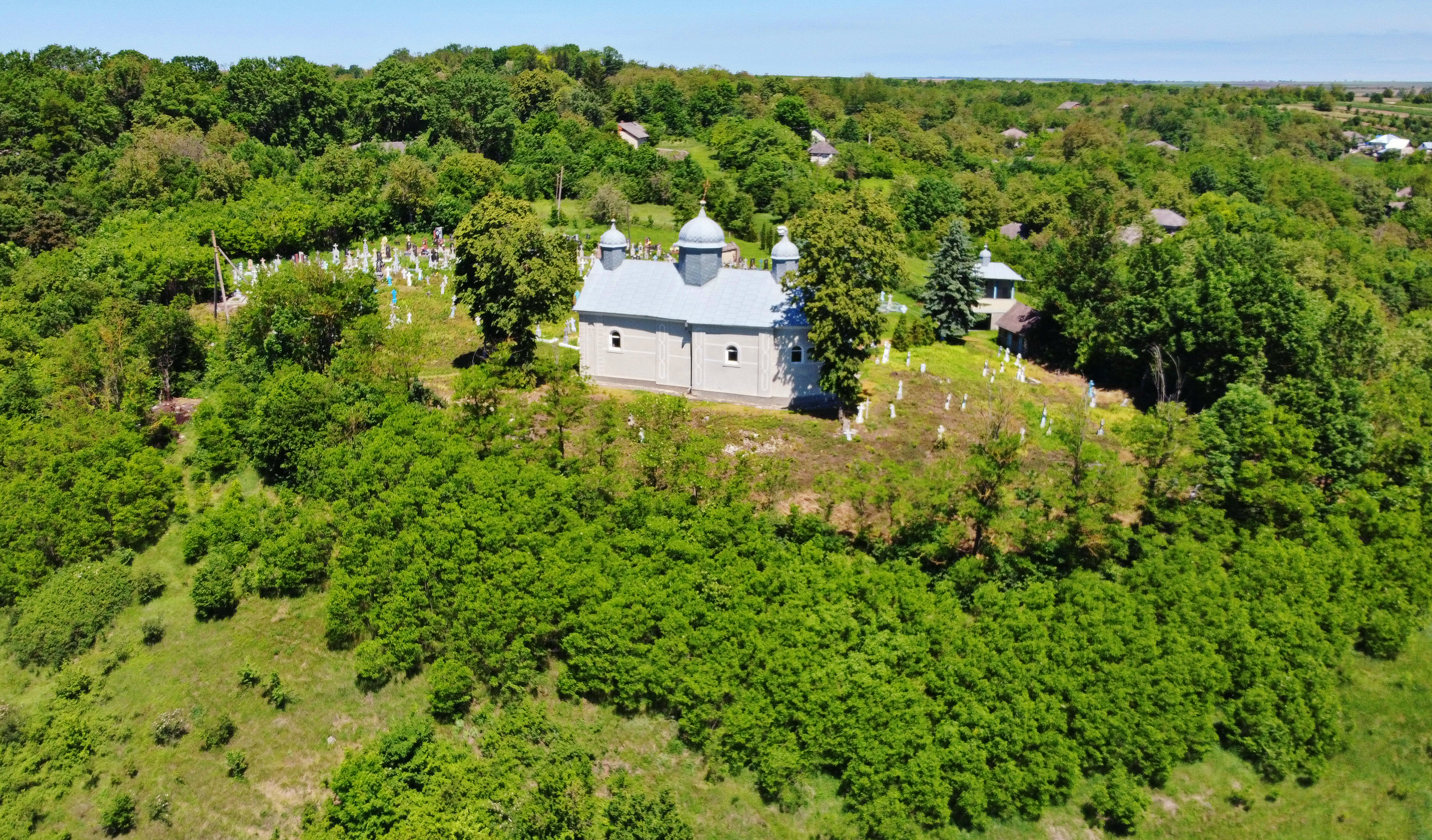
- Church of Assumption of the Virgin Mary

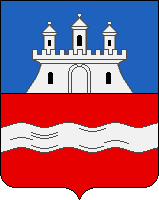
- Coat of arms

- Location in Ternopil Oblast
- Coordinates: 48°32′43″N 26°16′47″E
- Country: Ukraine
- Oblast: Ternopil Oblast
- Raion: Chortkiv Raion
- Hromada: Melnytsia-Podilska settlement hromada
- Time zone: UTC+2 (EET)
  - Summer (DST): UTC+3 (EEST)
- Postal code: 48755

Dzvenyhorod (Ukrainian: Дзвенигород) is a village in Melnytsia-Podilska settlement hromada, Chortkiv Raion, Ternopil Oblast, Ukraine.

== History ==
The first written mention is from 1126.

Until the end of the 18th century the Dzvenyhorod Castle was preserved.

In 1877 archaeological excavations were performed in the area by Adam Kirkor.

After the liquidation of the Borshchiv Raion on 19 July 2020, the village became part of the Chortkiv Raion.

== Religion ==
- Church of the Assumption (1801).

== Gallery ==
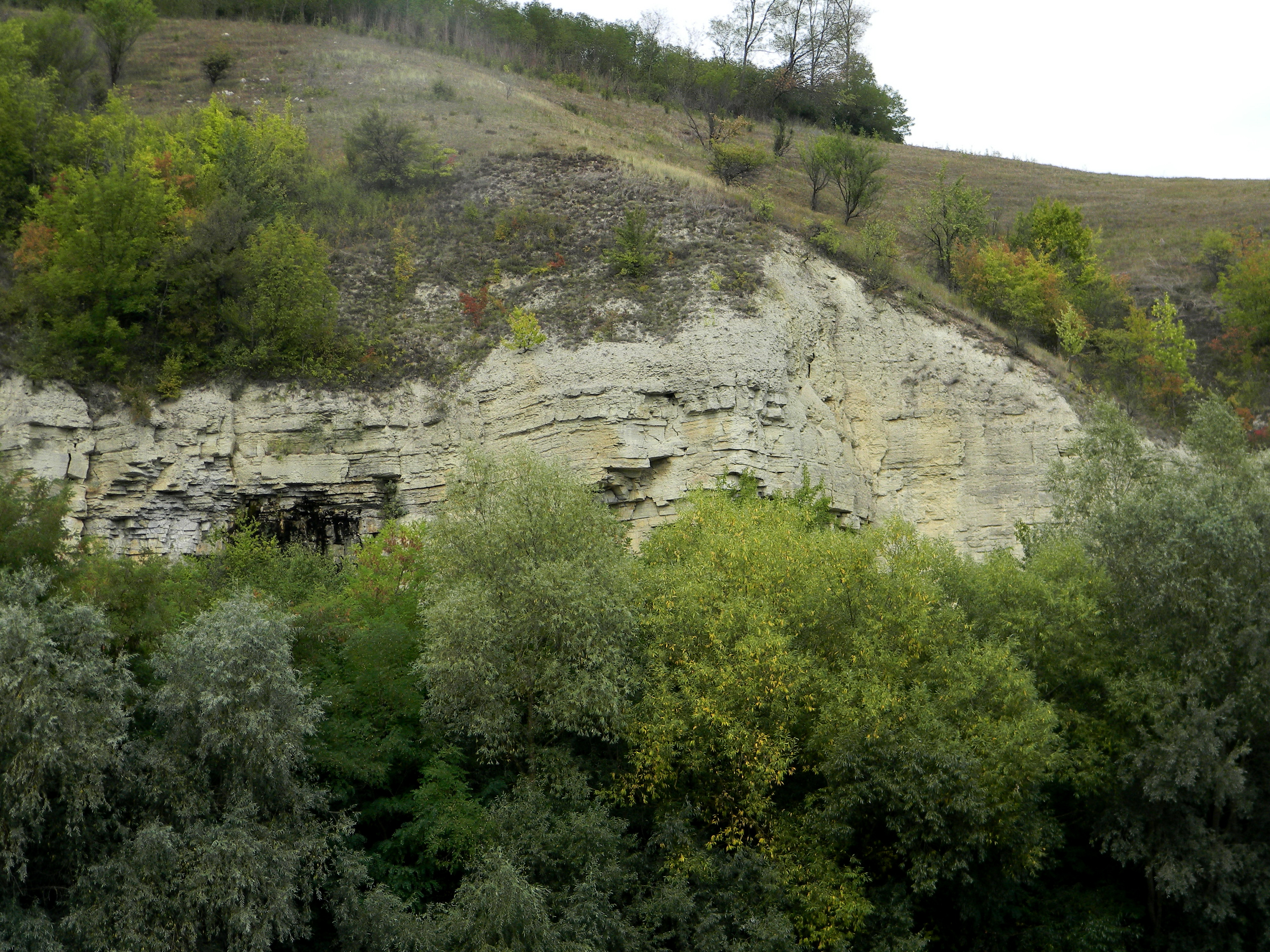
Old fortifications of Dzvenyhorod

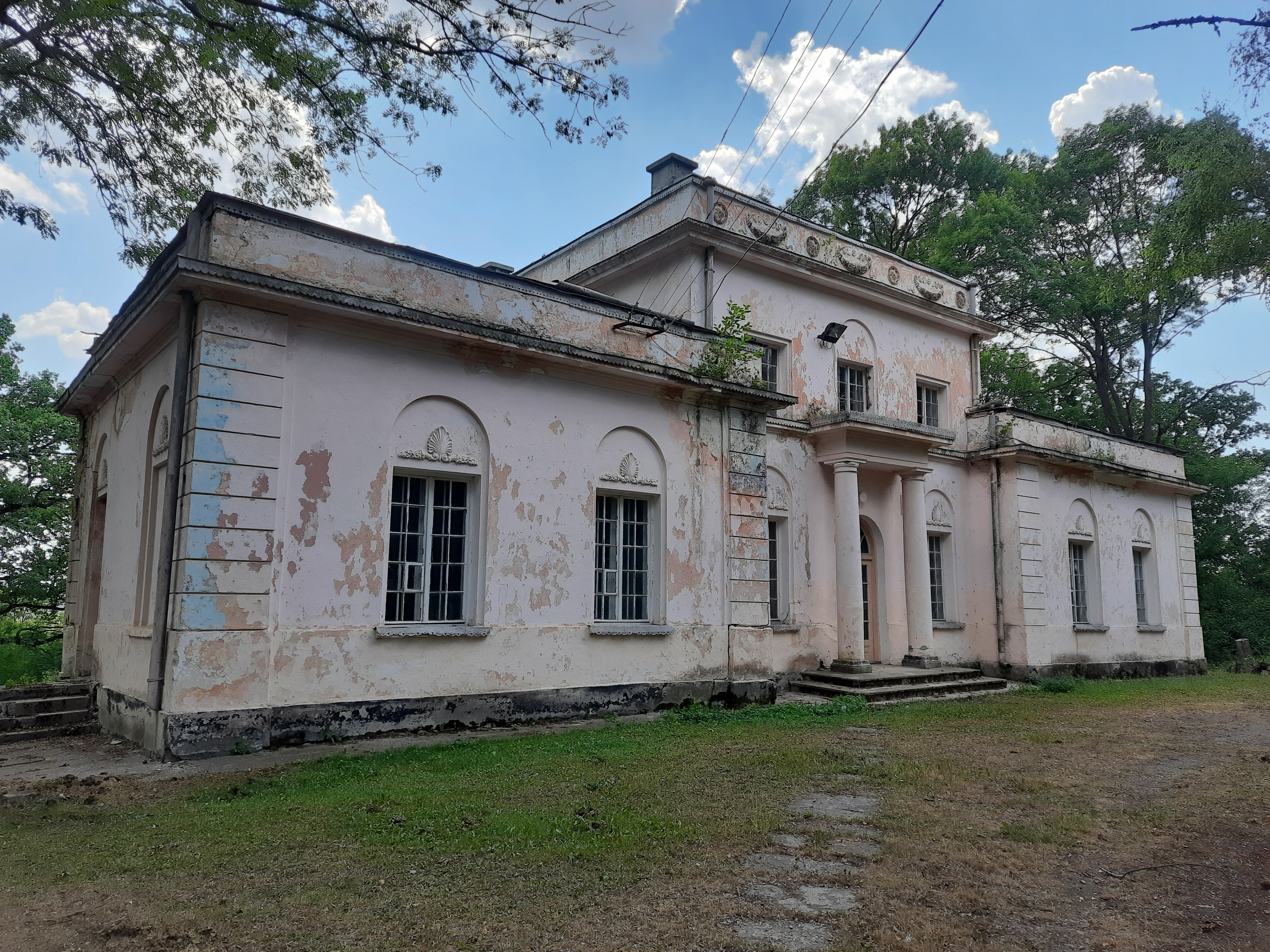
Former school

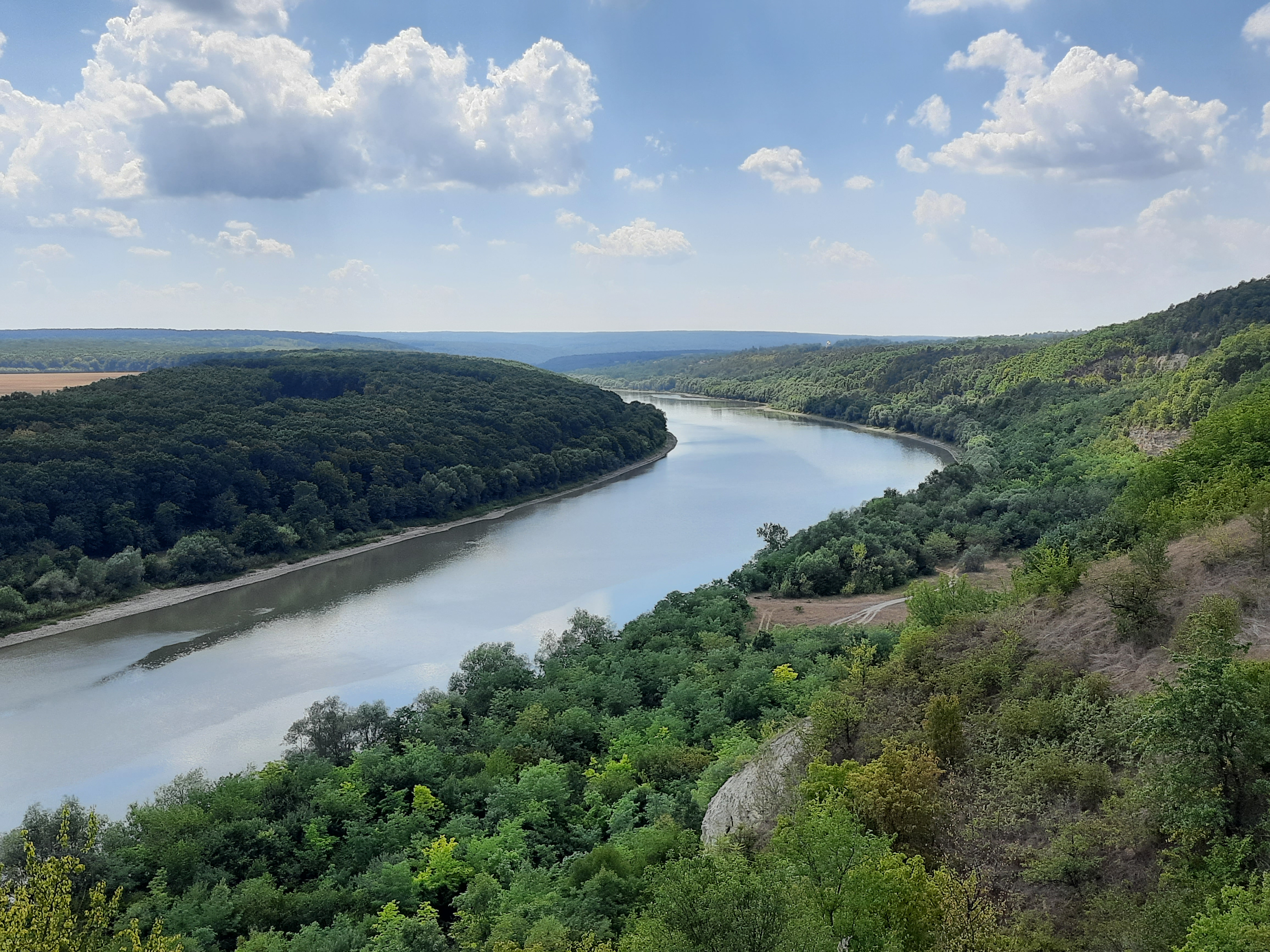
View of the Dniester in Dzvenyhorod

== Sources ==
- (in Ukrainian) Клименко О., Хаварівський Б., Дзвенигород // Ternopil Encyclopedic Dictionary: in 4 v. / editorial board: H. Yavorskyi and other, Ternopil: "Zbruch", 2004, V. 1: А—Й, S. 488–489. — ISBN 966-528-197-6.
- "Dźwinogród (1), miasteczko". Geographical Dictionary of the Kingdom of Poland (in Polish). 2. Warszawa: Kasa im. Józefa Mianowskiego. 1881. p. 310.
