= Order of Friendship of Peoples =

1972–1991 award of the Soviet Union

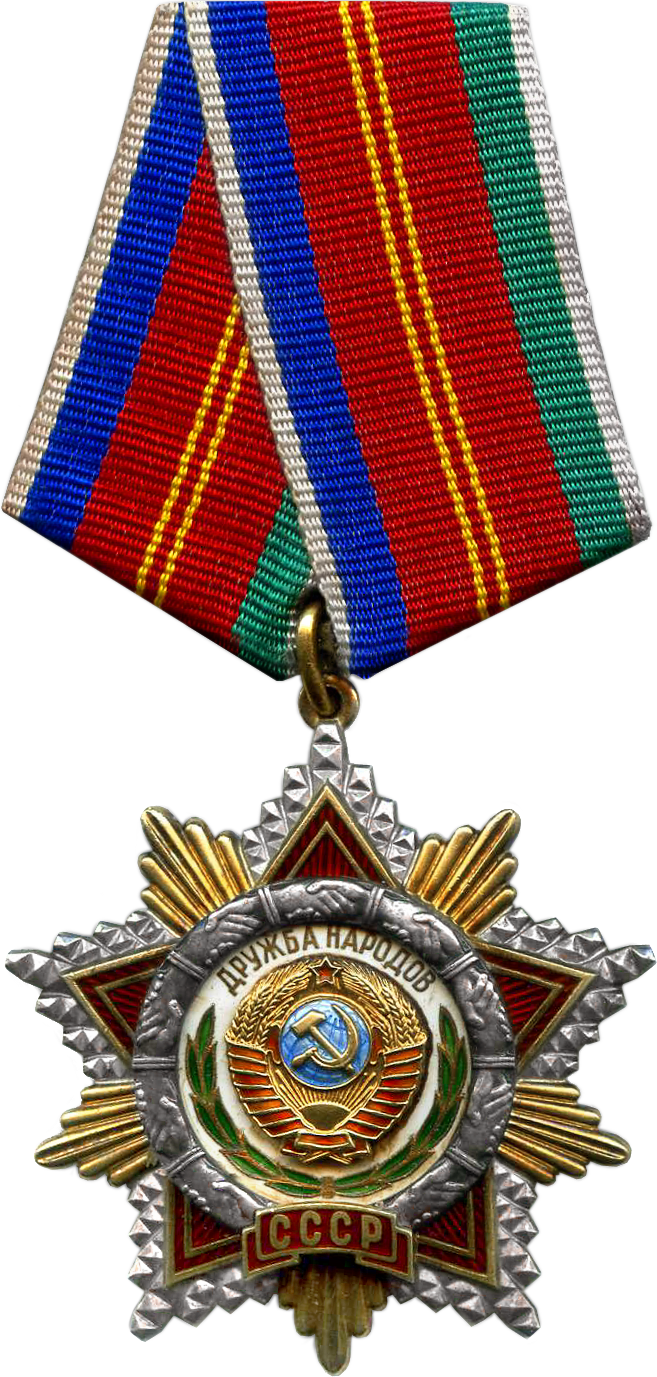
- Type: Individual/Organizational Award
- Presented by: Soviet Union
- Status: No longer issued
- Established: December 17, 1972
- First award: December 29, 1972
- Final award: December 21, 1991

Highlights
- Total: 72 760
- Ribbon

Precedence
- Next (higher): Order of the Red Banner of Labour
- Next (lower): Order of the Badge of Honour

The Order of Friendship of Peoples (Russian: oрден Дружбы народов, romanized: orden Druzhby narodov) was an order of the Soviet Union, and was awarded to persons (including non-citizens), organizations, enterprises, military units, as well as administrative subdivisions of the USSR for accomplishments in strengthening of inter-ethnic and international friendship and cooperation, for economical, political, scientific, military, and cultural development of the Soviet Union.

It was established on December 17, 1972, on the occasion of the 50th anniversary of the creation of the Soviet Union. The design of order was created by Alexander Zhuk. The status of Order was slightly amended by the Supreme Soviet of the Soviet Union in July 1980. It was abolished in December 1991. In the Russian Federation it was succeeded by the Order of Friendship, also designed by Alexander Zhuk.

The first recipient was the Russian Soviet Federative Socialist Republic (RSFSR), followed by the other republics of the Soviet Union.

== Notable recipients ==
- Abuzar Aydamirov, Chechen writer
- Chinghiz Aitmatov, Kyrgyz author
- Fazu Aliyeva, Avar poet
- Yusuf Dadoo, South African activist and opponent of Apartheid
- Yevgeniya Dolinyuk, Ukrainian kolkhoznik, politician and writer
- Toyohiro Akiyama, Japanese cosmonaut and journalist
- Helen Sharman, British cosmonaut
- Eduard Khil, Russian baritone singer

== See also ==
- Order of Friendship
- Lenin Peace Prize
