= Melnytsia-Podilska settlement hromada =

Hromada in Ternopil Oblast, Ukraine

Melnytsia-Podilska settlement hromada Мельнице-Подільська селищна громада
- hromada
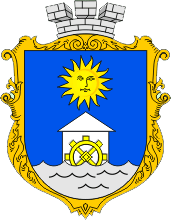
- Seal

- Location within Ternopil Oblast Location within Ukraine
- Coordinates: 48°36′22″N 26°10′55″E
- Country: Ukraine
- Oblast: Ternopil Oblast
- Raion: Chortkiv Raion
- Administrative center: Melnytsia-Podilska

Government
  - Hromada head: Volodymyr Bodnaruk

Area
  - Total: 245.2 km^{2} (94.7 sq mi)

Population (2022)
  - Total: 16,295
- Urban-type settlement: 1
- Villages: 21
- Website: melpodilska-gromada.gov.ua

Melnytsia-Podilska settlement hromada (Ukrainian: Мельнице-Подільська селищна територіальна громада, romanized: Melnytse-Podilska selyshchna terytorialna hromada) is a hromada in Ukraine, in Chortkiv Raion of Ternopil Oblast. The administrative center is the urban-type settlement of Melnytsia-Podilska. Its population is 16,295 (2022 estimate)

== History ==
It was formed on 20 July 2015 by merging the Melnytsia-Podilska town council and Vyhoda, Vilkhovets, Horoshova, Dzvyniach, Dnistrove, Zbruchanske, Kudryntsi, Urozhaine, Ustia, Khudykitsi village councils of Borshchiv Raion.

== Settlements ==
The hromada consists of 1 urban-type settlement (Melnytsia-Podilska) and 21 villages:

- Bilivtsi
- Boryshkivtsi
- Vyhoda
- Vilkhovets
- Horoshova
- Dzvenyhorod
- Dzvyniachka
- Dnistrove
- Zavallia
- Zbruchanske
- Zelene
- Kudryntsi
- Latkivtsi
- Mykhailivka
- Mykhalkiv
- Okopy
- Panivtsi
- Trubchyn
- Urozhaine
- Ustia
- Khudykivtsi
