= Khudykivtsi =

Rural locality in Ternopil Oblast, Ukraine

Khudykivtsi Худиківці
- Village
- Location in Ternopil Oblast
- Coordinates: 48°36′49″N 26°8′3″E
- Country: Ukraine
- Oblast: Ternopil Oblast
- Raion: Chortkiv Raion
- Hromada: Melnytsia-Podilska settlement hromada
- Time zone: UTC+2 (EET)
  - Summer (DST): UTC+3 (EEST)
- Postal code: 48751

Khudykivtsi (Ukrainian: Худиківці) is a village in Melnytsia-Podilska settlement hromada, Chortkiv Raion, Ternopil Oblast, Ukraine.

== History ==
The first written mention is from 1410.

After the liquidation of the Borshchiv Raion on 19 July 2020, the village became part of the Chortkiv Raion.

== Religion ==
- Saint Paraskevia church (1702, completed in the 1930s).

== Sources ==
- (in Ukrainian) Уніят, В., Худиківці // Ternopil Encyclopedic Dictionary: in 4 v. / editorial board: H. Yavorskyi and other, Ternopil: "Zbruch", 2008, V. 3: П—Я, S. 565. — ISBN 978-966-528-279-2.
- "Chudykowce, wieś, powiat borszczowski". Geographical Dictionary of the Kingdom of Poland (in Polish). 1. Warszawa: Kasa im. Józefa Mianowskiego. 1880. p. 655.
