= Vyhoda, Melnytsia-Podilska settlement hromada, Chortkiv Raion, Ternopil Oblast =

Rural locality in Ternopil Oblast, Ukraine

Vyhoda Вигода
- Village
- Location in Ternopil Oblast
- Coordinates: 48°32′18″N 26°21′7″E
- Country: Ukraine
- Oblast: Ternopil Oblast
- Raion: Chortkiv Raion
- Hromada: Melnytsia-Podilska settlement hromada
- Time zone: UTC+2 (EET)
  - Summer (DST): UTC+3 (EEST)
- Postal code: 48758

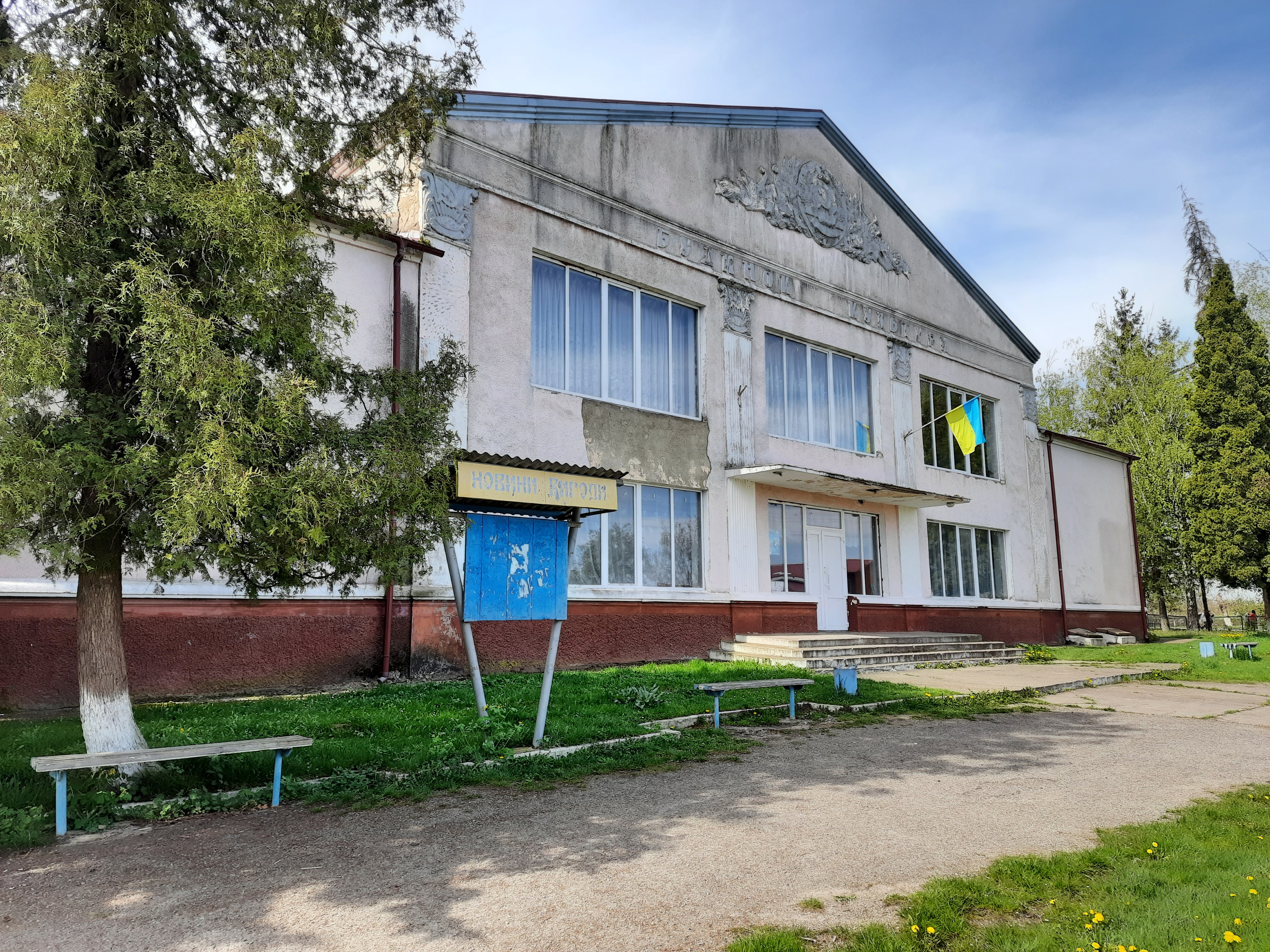
Vyhoda Village House of Culture, Chortkiv District, Ternopil Region

Vyhoda (Ukrainian: Вигода) is a village in Melnytsia-Podilska settlement hromada, Chortkiv Raion, Ternopil Oblast, Ukraine.

== History ==
The first written mention dates from 1785.

After the liquidation of the Borshchiv Raion on 19 July 2020, the village became part of the Chortkiv Raion.

== Religion ==
- two churches of the Ascension (1999, UGCC; 1887, OCU, restored in 1990).

== Sources ==
- "Wygoda (13), folwark w Szyszkowcach, pow. borszczowski". Geographical Dictionary of the Kingdom of Poland (in Polish). 14. Warszawa: Kasa im. Józefa Mianowskiego. 1895. p. 87.
