= Kudryntsi, Ternopil Oblast =

Rural locality in Ternopil Oblast, Ukraine

Kudryntsi Кудринці
- Village
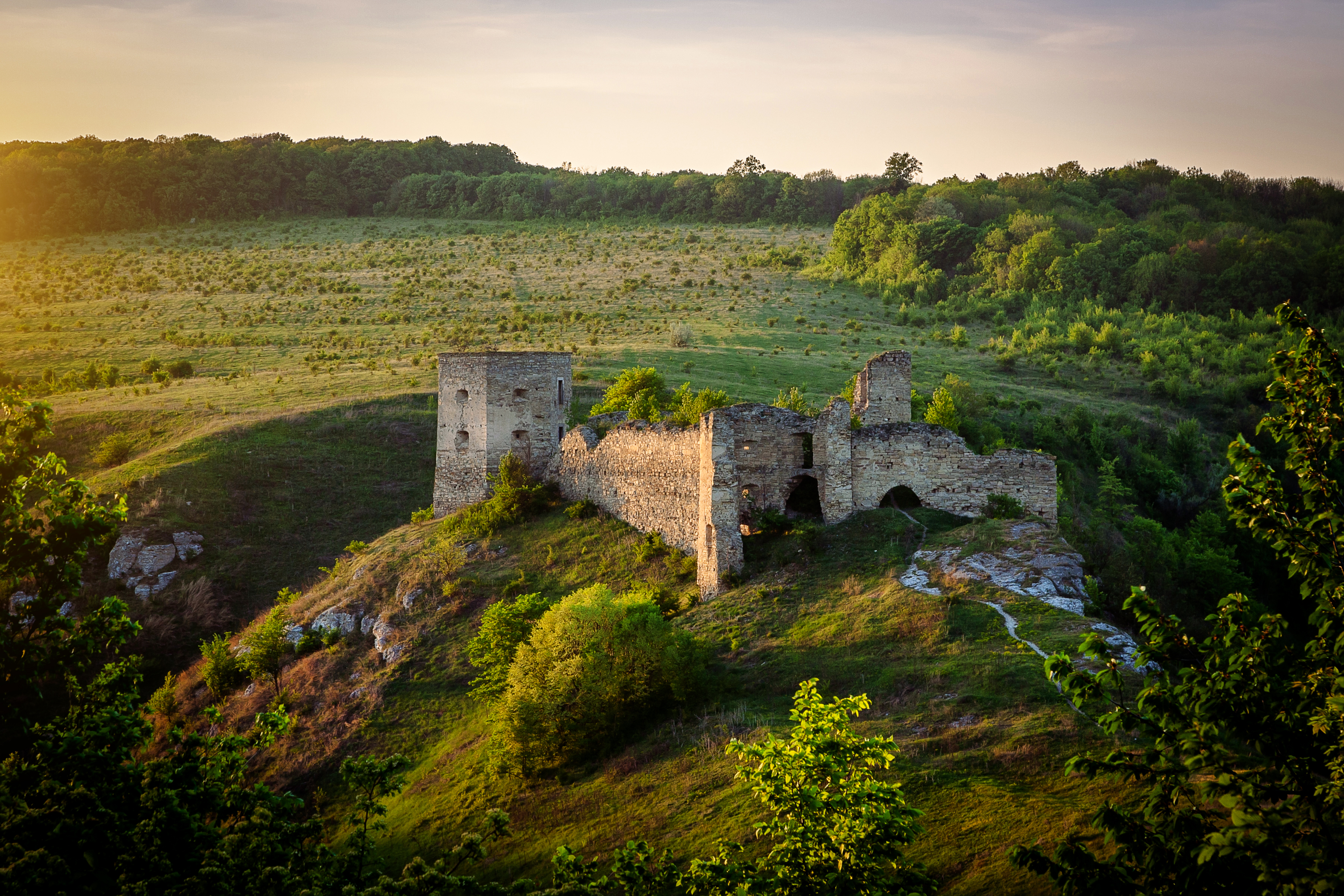
- Castle in Kudryntsi

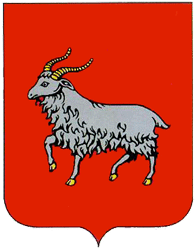
- Coat of arms

- Location in Ternopil Oblast
- Coordinates: 48°36′53″N 26°17′16″E
- Country: Ukraine
- Oblast: Ternopil Oblast
- Raion: Chortkiv Raion
- Hromada: Melnytsia-Podilska Hromada
- Time zone: UTC+2 (EET)
  - Summer (DST): UTC+3 (EEST)
- Postal code: 48750

Kudryntsi (Ukrainian: Кудринці; Polish: Kudryńce) is a village in Melnytsia-Podilska settlement hromada, Chortkiv Raion, Ternopil Oblast, Ukraine.

== History ==
The first written mention in the smoke register is in 1487.

In 1615, a descendant of Mykola Herburt, Jan Shchastnyi Herburt (1567–1616), built a stone castle on the high mountain of Striltsi.

== Religion ==
- Exaltation of the Holy Cross church

== Monuments ==
- Kudryntsi Castle
