= Vilkhovets, Chotrtkiv Raion, Ternopil Oblast =

Rural locality in Ternopil Oblast, Ukraine

Vilkhovets Вільховець
- Village
- Location in Ternopil Oblast
- Coordinates: 48°33′38″N 26°9′14″E
- Country: Ukraine
- Oblast: Ternopil Oblast
- Raion: Chortkiv Raion
- Hromada: Melnytsia-Podilska settlement hromada
- Time zone: UTC+2 (EET)
  - Summer (DST): UTC+3 (EEST)
- Postal code: 48754

Vilkhovets (Ukrainian: Вільховець) is a village in Melnytsia-Podilska settlement hromada, Chortkiv Raion, Ternopil Oblast, Ukraine.

== History ==
The first written mention is from 1403.

After the liquidation of the Borshchiv Raion on 19 July 2020, the village became part of the Chortkiv Raion.

== Religion ==
- Church of the Intercession (1938, built on the site of the old one, which was built in 1784).

== Sources ==
- (in Ukrainian) Уніят В., Вільховець // Ternopil Encyclopedic Dictionary: in 4 v. / editorial board: H. Yavorskyi and other, Ternopil: "Zbruch", 2004, V. 1: А—Й, S. 281. — ISBN 966-528-197-6.
- "Olchowiec 10.) O., wś, pow. borszczowski". Geographical Dictionary of the Kingdom of Poland (in Polish). 7. Warszawa: Kasa im. Józefa Mianowskiego. 1886. p. 452.
