= Perebykivtsi =

Village in Chernivtsi Oblast, Ukraine

Perebykivtsi Перебиківці Perebicăuți
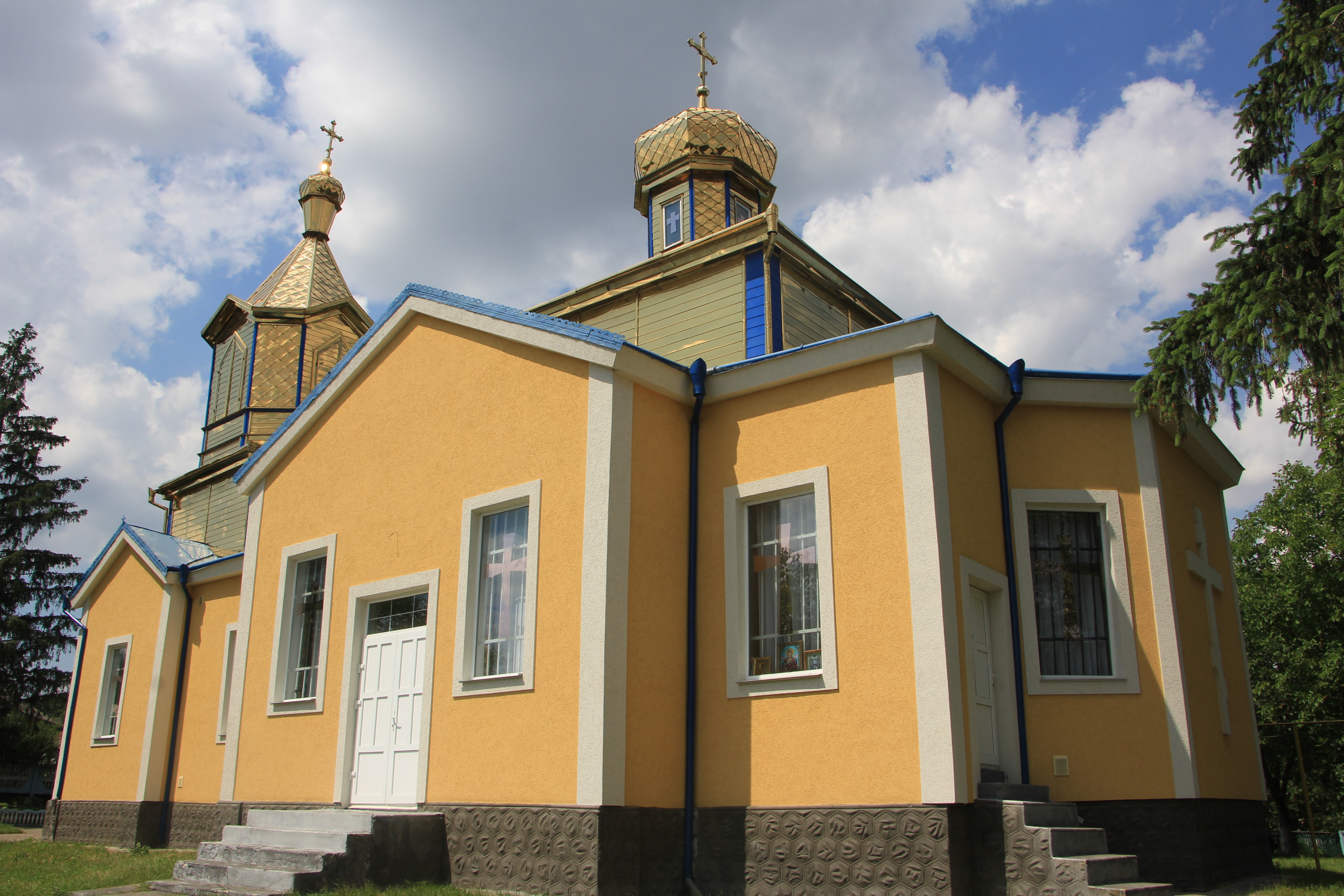
- Church of the Archangel St Michael (1917)
- Interactive map of Perebykivtsi
- Location of Perebykivtsi in Ukraine Perebykivtsi (Ukraine)
- Coordinates: 48°35′9.96″N 26°8′8.88″E
- Country: Ukraine
- Oblast: Chernivtsi Oblast
- Raion: Dniester Raion
- First mentioned: 1598
- Elevation: 162 m (531 ft)

Population (2019)
  - Total: 2,695
- Time zone: UTC+2 (EET)
  - Summer (DST): UTC+3 (EEST)
- Postal code: 60010
- Area code: +380 3731
- KOATUU: 7325086401

Perebykivtsi (Ukrainian: Перебиківці; Romanian: Perebicăuți) is a village in Dniester Raion, Chernivtsi Oblast, Ukraine. It belongs to Klishkivtsi rural hromada, one of the hromadas of Ukraine.

Until 18 July 2020, Perebykivtsi belonged to Khotyn Raion. The raion was abolished in July 2020 as part of the administrative reform of Ukraine, which reduced the number of raions of Chernivtsi Oblast to three. The area of Khotyn Raion was merged into Dniester Raion.
