= Bilivtsi, Ternopil Oblast =

Rural locality in Ternopil Oblast, Ukraine

Bilivtsi Білівці
- Village
- Location in Ternopil Oblast
- Coordinates: 48°30′55″N 26°21′56″E
- Country: Ukraine
- Oblast: Ternopil Oblast
- Raion: Chortkiv Raion
- Hromada: Melnytsia-Podilska settlement hromada
- Time zone: UTC+2 (EET)
  - Summer (DST): UTC+3 (EEST)
- Postal code: 48758

Bilivtsi (Ukrainian: Білівці) is a village in Melnytsia-Podilska settlement hromada, Chortkiv Raion, Ternopil Oblast, Ukraine.

== History ==
The first written mention is from 1515.

After the liquidation of the Borshchiv Raion on 19 July 2020, the village became part of the Chortkiv Raion.

== Religion ==
- Saint Michael church (1875, UGCC).

== Sources ==
- (in Ukrainian) Мельничук Б., Сергеєва Н., Білівці // Ternopil Encyclopedic Dictionary: in 4 v. / editorial board: H. Yavorskyi and other, Ternopil: "Zbruch", 2004, V. 1: А—Й, S. 133. — ISBN 966-528-197-6.
- "Bielowce". Geographical Dictionary of the Kingdom of Poland (in Polish). 1. Warszawa: Kasa im. Józefa Mianowskiego. 1880. p. 214.
- "Bielowce". Geographical Dictionary of the Kingdom of Poland (in Polish). p. 142.
