= Alexander Marmorek =

French bacteriologist and Zionist leader (1865–1923)

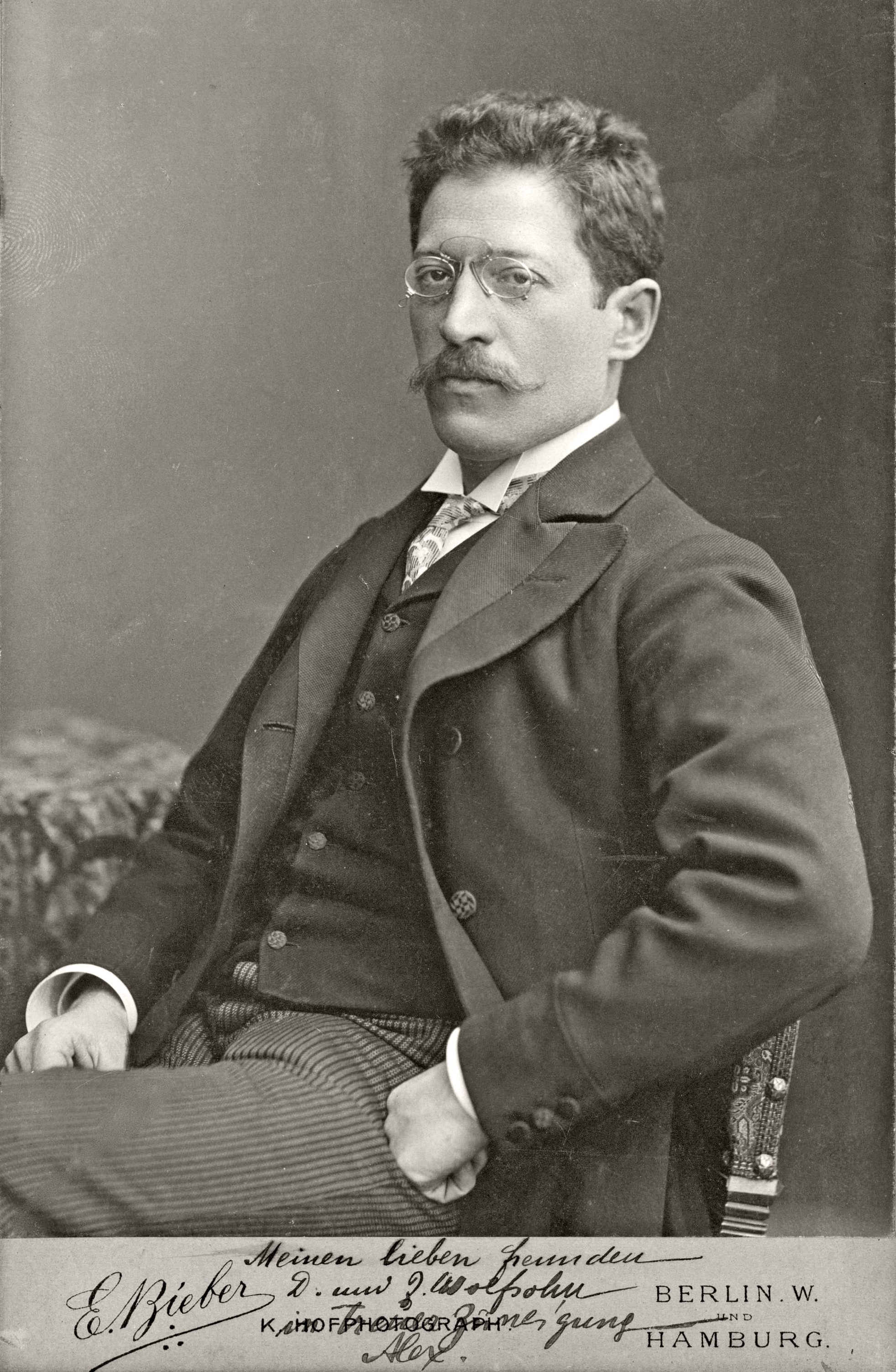
- Born: 19 February 1865; Mielnica, Galicia, Austria-Hungary
- Died: 12 July 1923 (aged 58); Paris, France

Academic work
- Discipline: Microbiology
- Sub-discipline: Bacteriology

Alexander Marmorek (Hebrew: אלכסנדר מרמורק; February 19, 1865 – July 12, 1923) was a Galician-born French bacteriologist and Zionist leader.

== Early life ==
Marmorek was born on February 19, 1865, in Mielnica, Galicia, Austria-Hungary, the son of physician Josef Marmorek and Friederike Jacobson. His brothers were architect and fellow Zionist leader Oskar Marmorek, lawyer Isidor Marmorek, and writer Schiller Marmorek.

Marmorek attended a gymnasium. He then went to the University of Vienna, graduating from there with an M.D. in 1887. He then went to Paris, France, and went to the Pasteur Institute as a student. He later became an assistant there.

== Career ==
In 1894, he wrote Versuch einer Theorie der Septischen Krankheiten in Vienna. Initially an obstetrician, he turned to bacteriology and first attracted Pasteur's attention with his investigations into the role lymphatic glands in the body's defense against bacteria. He was considered for the position of assistant at the University of Vienna's medical faculty, but was rejected because he was a Jew. He left for Paris in 1893, and he became research director (chef des travaux) of the Pasteur Institute laboratory.

Marmorek discovered an antidote for puerperal fever, antistreptococcus, early in his studies. In 1903, he addressed the Académie Nationale de Médecine and announced the discovery of the toxin of the tubercle-bacillus and of the antituberculosis vaccine. His discovery was debated in expert circles before it was accepted as a successful cure if taken up to a certain stage of the disease. He also initiated a serum study that led to later treatments for typhus and diabetes. In 1911, his anti-consumption cure was used on the Russian Minister of Foreign Affairs Sergey Sazonov, for which Sazanov sent a letter thanking Marmorek. When World War I began in 1914, he volunteered his services for the French Army. But due to his nationality, he was made a prisoner of war and detained for two months, at which point he was released and went to Vienna. He spent the war serving as a physician in Eastern Europe. After the war, he returned to France and continued his research, especially on typhus and diabetes.

Marmorek was among the earliest modern Zionists; as a student he was a member of the Ḳadimah, the first students' Zionist society in Vienna. An ardent Zionist, he was head of the French Zionist Federation, the founder of Jewish Popular University in Paris, and a founder of the Paris Zionist monthly Echo Sioniste. He was an elected member of the Zionist General Council of the first eleven World Zionist Congress, from 1897 to 1913. He and his brothers Oscar and Isidor were in a circle of Theodor Herzl's closest friends, and following Herzl's death remained an adherent of Herzl's Political Zionism. When the Practical Zionists took over the movement's leadership in 1911, he and Max Nordau were the foremost spokesmen of the opposition. After World War I, he opposed Chaim Weizmann's policies and refused to participate in the 12th Zionist Congress in 1921. He emphasized in articles and speeches that Mandatory Palestine was not the fulfillment of Herzl's ideas of a Jewish state.

In 1899, Marmorek received a Knight's Cross of the Order of Franz Joseph. In 1900, he was appointed a Chevalier of the Legion of Honour. In 1910, he married Rachel Steinberg, a doctor who served as director of the orthopedic department in Paris' largest children's hospital.

== Death and legacy ==
Marmorek died on July 12, 1923 at his home. No eulogy was delivered at his funeral. Félix Mesnil of the Pasteur Institute, Leo Motzkin of the World Zionist Organization, M. Sliosberg, Hillel Zlatopolski, M. Allienkoff, M. Fischer of Holland and M. Ornstein of Belgium were among those who attended the funeral. He was buried in Cimetière parisien de Bagneux, although in 1954 French Zionists approached the Israeli government have his remains reburied in Israel.

In 1930, a Yemenite settlement was established one and a half kilometers from Rehovot by the Jewish National Fund and named after Marmorek.
