= Boryshkivtsi, Ternopil Oblast =

Rural locality in Ternopil Oblast, Ukraine

Boryshkivtsi Боришківці
- Village
- Location in Ternopil Oblast
- Coordinates: 48°33′5″N 26°21′30″E
- Country: Ukraine
- Oblast: Ternopil Oblast
- Raion: Chortkiv Raion
- Hromada: Melnytsia-Podilska settlement hromada
- Time zone: UTC+2 (EET)
  - Summer (DST): UTC+3 (EEST)
- Postal code: 48758

Boryshkivtsi (Ukrainian: Боришківці) is a village in Melnytsia-Podilska settlement hromada, Chortkiv Raion, Ternopil Oblast, Ukraine.

== History ==
The village was founded in 1431 and is known from written sources from the 18th century.

After the liquidation of the Borshchiv Raion on 19 July 2020, the village became part of the Chortkiv Raion.

== Religion ==
- two churches of St. Demetrius (1926, brick, OCU; UGCC).

== Sources ==
- (in Ukrainian) Ониськів, М., Боришківці // Ternopil Encyclopedic Dictionary: in 4 v. / editorial board: H. Yavorskyi and other, Ternopil: "Zbruch", 2004, V. 1: А—Й, S. 171. — ISBN 966-528-197-6.
- "Boryszkowce, wś, pow. borszczowski". Geographical Dictionary of the Kingdom of Poland (in Polish). 1. Warszawa: Kasa im. Józefa Mianowskiego. 1880. p. 338.
