= Church of Saint Simeon =

Church of Saint Simeon may refer to:

- Church of Saint Simeon Stylites, a 5th century church northwest of Aleppo, Syria
- Church of St. Symeon, Mytilene, an 18th century church on Lesbos, Greece
- Church of St. Simeon the Canaanite, a 9th/10th century church in Abkhazia/Georgia
- Church of Saint Simeon, Zadar, Croatia, the location of the Chest of Saint Simeon
- Simeon Stylites church, Dubivka, Ternopil Oblast, Ukraine

== See also ==
- St. Simeon's and St. Anne's Cathedral Church, Tallinn, Estonia
- St. Simeon and St. Anne's Cathedral, Jelgava, Latvia
- St. Simeon of the Wonderful Mountain Church, Dresden, Germany
