= House of Dubikowski =

Ruthenian noble family

Polish medieval CoA Ostoja.

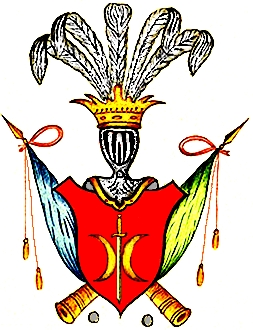
Dubikowski (Dubiejkowski) family Ostoja CoA. (LVIA, 391. Ap.6, Sv.609).

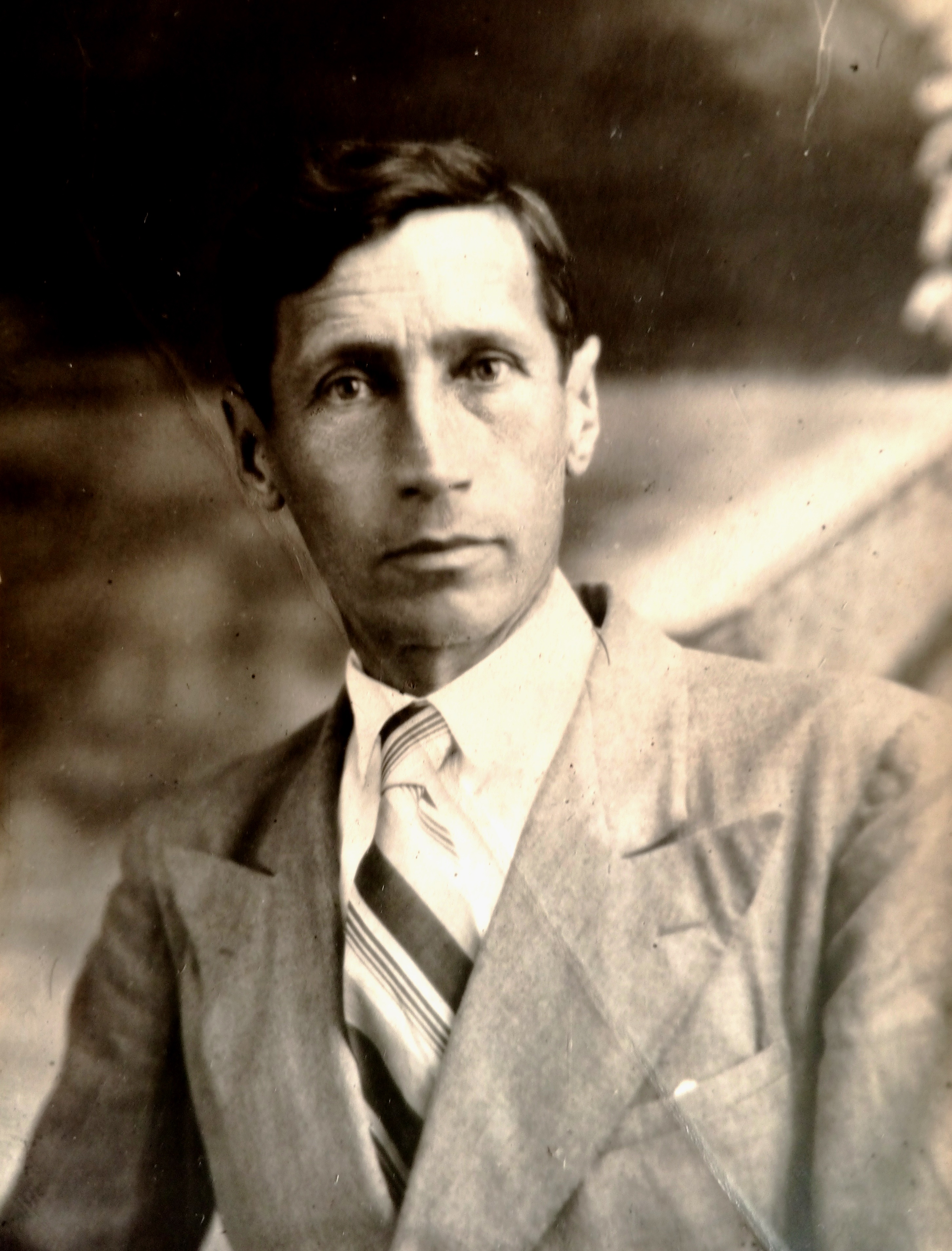
Faust Dubikowski (1902–1982) – chief veterinarian of the Horodotsky district of the Lviv region (1946–1963), a military doctor of the 3rd rank (reserve captain).

The House of Dubikowski – is an ancient Ruthenian (Polish-Lithuanian) noble family with the coat of arms of Ostoja, belonging to the heraldic Clan Ostoja (Moscics). The date when the Dubikowski family joined the heraldic Clan of Ostoja is unknown. This could have happened in the 15th century.

== Families origin and prehistory ==
According to the family book, the ancestors of the Dubikowski (Dubiejkowski) family dedicated themselves to military service, knighthood on the coast of Prussia and priesthood in the Sacred grove at the evergreen oak on the Dubissa River near the ancient capital of Samogitia/Zemaitija Ariogala. According to family tradition, the legendary ancestor of the Dubikowski family was Oleg the Wise. Until the end of the 15th century, the family was known as Vedun (Witan, rus. Вещий, Ведун) family, which means a sorcerer, priest, magus, wise man, hierophant. The first known representatives of the family who used the Ostoja CoA were two brothers Martin and Matvej Vedun (Witan), who for their services to the fatherland were awarded for the reign of the last appanage prince Mstislavsky in the early 1500s.

== The estates belonging to the family ==
Listed below are the most important lands belonging to the Dubikowski of the Ostoja CoA.

More important lands and estates: tract Pavlovskoe (Branikozhi) near Novogrudok; estate Dubejkovo near Mstislavl, estates near Smolensk: Poretskoye, Stankovo, Korenkovo and Folvark Kovalev; Verzhbolovo and Osovets, Usha Lyavshovskaya, the land of Belakovshchina (later Baidukovskaya), the land around Kustovnitsa, Korytno (Lihachi), and Zaluzhye in the Oshmiany region, the land in Zapatashnya, the estates Berezhanka, Domaninka, Kulikovo near Kremenets, Berdniki near Fastov.

== Family representatives ==
- Martin and Matvej Vedun (Witan) (b.~1480) – for their services to the fatherland, they were awarded estates near Mstislavl in the early 1500s during the reign of the appanage Prince Mikhail Ivanovich Zaslavsky (Mstislavsky) (d. ca. 1534).
- Samuel Dubikowski (~1570–1660) – for his chivalrous bravery received lands in the tract Pavlovskoe (Branikozhi) near Novogrudok from Sigismund III Vasa in 1592.
- Boleslaw Dubikowski (d. after 1688) – Smolensk's Deputy cup-bearer (Podchashiy) in the mid- 1600s. His wife Anna Skopowna was a daughter of ruler of Samogitia / Zhemaytia) Hans Skopovny. They owned estate Kovalev in Minsk district. Hans Skopovny was the son of the Royal secretary, Skerstomon and Tendziagilski (Samogitia land, Taurage County) ruler in 1527–1529, Stanislav Skop from Dovsprung dynasty and his wife Princess Helena Andreevna Sangushko (1490–1561).
- Joannes Dubikowski (d. after 1634) – a nobleman, participated in the trial of the city Chelm court in 1634.
- Jan Dubikowski (d. after 1662) – soldier of the regiment of Capt. Włodimier Dagbog Kaminski, standard-bearer (cornet, 'khorunzhy') of Mścisłavl. His wife was Konstancia Miladowska, daughter of Treasurer of Orsha in 1656 Mikolaj Kazimierz Miladowski. They owned estates in the Smolensk Province Stankowo and Korenkovo.
- Katerina Dubikowska (d. I half of the 1700s) – in the late 1600s was the wife of the Polotsk guard Michael Surin (his own CoA – derived from the CoA Massalski). Michael Surin was the son of Elias Surin, colonel of the Lithuanian army and deputy starost of Mstislavl. They owned many estates in the Kiev land and Mogilev land including Hostomel. Previously, the Surins owned the Chernobyl Castie from 1548 to 1550.
- Mikhal Dubikowski (d. 1729) – a comrade of the armored regiment (heavy noble cavalry – 'hussariya'); he received from the king John III (Jan Sobieski) the rank of the Pinsk bridge guard (Mostovnichiy) in 1692. He owned several estates in the Mozyr district including the estates of Verzhbolovo and Osovets.
- Lauren Dubikowski (d. 1754) – received the rank of Novogrudok cornet 'khorunzhy' from Hetman and Prince Mikhail Kazimir Radzivil in 1751. He owned the estates of Korytno and Zaluzhnoye in the Oshmiany region.
- Jan Dubikowski (d. after 1788) – a deputy at the Seimik of Minsk in 1787.
- Felician Dubikowski – warden (overseer) of town Zudr (deputy mayor) in Mozyr district.
- Mikołaj Dubikowski (b. 1802) – the supervisor and teacher of German at the Kanev Imperial College (1830).
- Michal Dubikowski (b. 1793) – the Rittmeister (Captain) of Rechitsa (Gomel region) in the middle-to-late 1800s.
- Grzegorz Dubikowski (b. 1777) – the lancer regiment of the 1811.
- Jean Dubikowski (d. after 1815) – Chevalier of the 17th regiment of the Polish cavalry (lancers of Brigadier general Count Michal Tyszkiewicz) as part of the army of the Grand Duchy of Warsaw in 1812–1815.
- Felician Dubikowski (b. 1796) – participant of the 1830–1831 uprising.
- Jozef Dubikowski (b. 1824) – graduated from the Chernigov Provincial Gymnasium (1840–1843), titular councilor, physician of the Galician battalion of the Jaeger regiment (1854–1855), a collegiate assessor in Kremenets (1870–1876). Together with his wife Apolonia Radzyminska (CoA Lis) owned the estates Berezhanka, Domaninka, and Kulikovo near Kremenets.
- Jan Dubikowski (b. 1748) – owner, together with his wife Agata Oranska (CoA Kosciesza Oransky), of the estate Berdniki near Fastov in the Kyiv province,. Married in 1770. Son Pavel (1778–1832).
- Faust Dubikowski (1902–1982) – chief veterinarian of Horodocki region of Lviv district (1946–1963), military doctor of the 3rd rank (reserve captain). Faust invented a medicinal serum for pigs and horses. He was awarded by medals: For the victory over Germany, For the capture of Budapest, For the victory over Japan. Son of August.
- Taisia Slawinska (Dubikowska) (1911–1994) – came from an ancient noble family of the Slawinski (CoA Leliva). She was the chief zootechnician, a deputy of the Horodocki region council. Taisia was the niece of Maksim Slawinski (1868–1945), a famous diplomat, translator, ethnographer, poet and writer. In 1906 M. Slawinski was a deputy of the first Duma of the Russian Empire, briefly served as a rector of the KPI, represented Ukraine in the interim government of Kerensky, was a representative of Ukraine to the Don Army, from 1919 headed a diplomatic mission from the UNR in Prague.
- Arnold Dubikowski (1938–2024) – submariner-saboteur (P. Sudoplatov school), personal guard of Marshal Zhukov. Served in the USSR and Libya, colonel in the reserve.
- Leonid Dubikowski (1944–2012) – Doctor of technical sciences, scientist, public person, chorus man. Leonid had about 70 scientific works, including 30 scientific inventions. He worked in the system of Ukrainian SSR Academy of sciences: Institute of Cybernetics, Institute for Problems of Materials Science, Institute for Metal Physics.
- Tamara Kukhta (Dubikowska) (b. 1944) – Doctor of Physical and Mathematical Sciences, scientist. She worked at the named by Glushkov Institute of Cybernetics. Her great-great-grandfather was Kuncewicz Gorgoniucz from an ancient noble family (CoA‘Lebedz’). Also Tamara's great-grandfather was Timofey Nikolaevich of the ancient Martynov family. His father, Nikolai Alekseevich Martynov a retired Major general (CoA derived from the CoA Lebedz), was the governor of Kamchatka during the Crimean War, and after in Poland he was the military chief of the Petrokov Province. Martynov's ancestors were related to the Paleologues, direct descendants of the last emperor of Byzantium, in the line of one of the brothers of Sophia Paleolog (wife of Vasili II and grandmother of Ivan the Terrible).
- Ari Ros AsUr KAN (Stanislav Dubikowski) – the Head of the Great Eurasia (Rus-Orda) global project. Reserve Major, Arabists, Chorus man, PhD, Director of the Institute for Social and Economic Development. Author of about 35 scientific papers. Author of the monograph "The End of Epoch: The Fatal Choice of Humanity" (2019), which was published in Russian, English and German. Author of the fundamental work "Palimpsest of the Gods: The Secret Revealed" (2020) (Russian). Researcher, collector and compiler of genealogy, author of a history book "The Story of One Kin" (2024, prebook) (Russian and English edition).

== See also ==
- Ostoya.org (official site)
- Ostoja CoA
- Clan Ostoja (Moscics)
- Hans Scopowny

== Bibliography ==
- Ari Ros AsUr KAN. The Story of One Kin. Kiev 2024, 89 s.
- Herbarz Szlachty Białoruskiej. T. 5. D, J.S.Hlinski [i in.]; red.nauk.A.Rachuba. – Minsk; Belarus, 2018. – 947 s. [16] ark.il.
- Szlachta WKL. J.Lyczkowski. (Rody ktore otrzymaly nobilitacju do roku 1795). Herbarz szlachty białoruskiej. Tom 5
- Rody rycerskie Wielkiego Księstwa Litewskiego, T. 3 (E-K). Jan Ciechanowicz. Fosze, 2001, s. 203
- Rody rycerskie Wielkiego Księstwa Litewskiego. T. 2 (A-D). Jan Ciechanowicz. Fosze, 2001, 403 s..
- Miesie̜cznik heraldyczny, Volumes 16–18. Nakł. Oddziału Warszawskiego Polskiego Towarzystwa Heraldycznego, 1937, s. 68, 117.
- Starodawne prawa polskiego pomniki z ksiąg rękopiśmiennych dotąd nieużytych główniej zaś z ksiąg dawnych sądowych ziemskich i grodzkich ziemi krakowskiej, wyd. A. Z. Helcel, Kraków 1870.
- Joseph Tyszkiewicz (hrabia.). Histoire du 17me Régt. de Cavalerie Polonaise (Lanciers du Cte. Michel Tyszkiewicz), 1812–1815. Published by W.L. Anczyc, 1904, s. 68.
- S. Dubikowski. Palimpsest of the Gods. Kiev, 2020, 276 s.
- Gorbachova V.V. Uczestnicy powstania 1830–1831 na Białorusi. Słownik bibliograficzny / V.V. Gorbaczowa. – Mińsk; BDU, 2004. S.134.
- Akty izdavaemye Vilenskou kommissieiu dlia razbora drevnikh aktov, Т. 23, s.86.
