= Tallinn Cathedral =

Tallinn Cathedral may refer to:

- St. Mary's Cathedral, Tallinn, (also known as "Dome Church"), Estonian Evangelical Lutheran
- Alexander Nevsky Cathedral, Tallinn, Estonian Orthodox Church of the Moscow Patriarchate
- St. Peter and St. Paul's Cathedral, Tallinn, Roman Catholic
- St. Simeon's and St. Anne's Cathedral Church, Tallinn, Estonian Apostolic Orthodox Church

== See also ==
- List of cathedrals in Estonia
