= Zbryzh =

Zbryzh (Ukrainian: Збриж) may refer to the following populated places in Ukraine:

- Zbryzh, Khmelnytskyi Oblast
- Zbryzh, Ternopil Oblast
