= Ivankiv, Ternopil Oblast =

Rural locality in Ternopil Oblast, Ukraine

Ivankiv Іванків
- Location in Ternopil Oblast
- Coordinates: 48°49′23″N 26°9′50″E
- Country: Ukraine
- Oblast: Ternopil Oblast
- Raion: Chortkiv Raion
- Hromada: Skala-Podilska settlement hromada
- Time zone: UTC+2 (EET)
  - Summer (DST): UTC+3 (EEST)
- Postal code: 48723

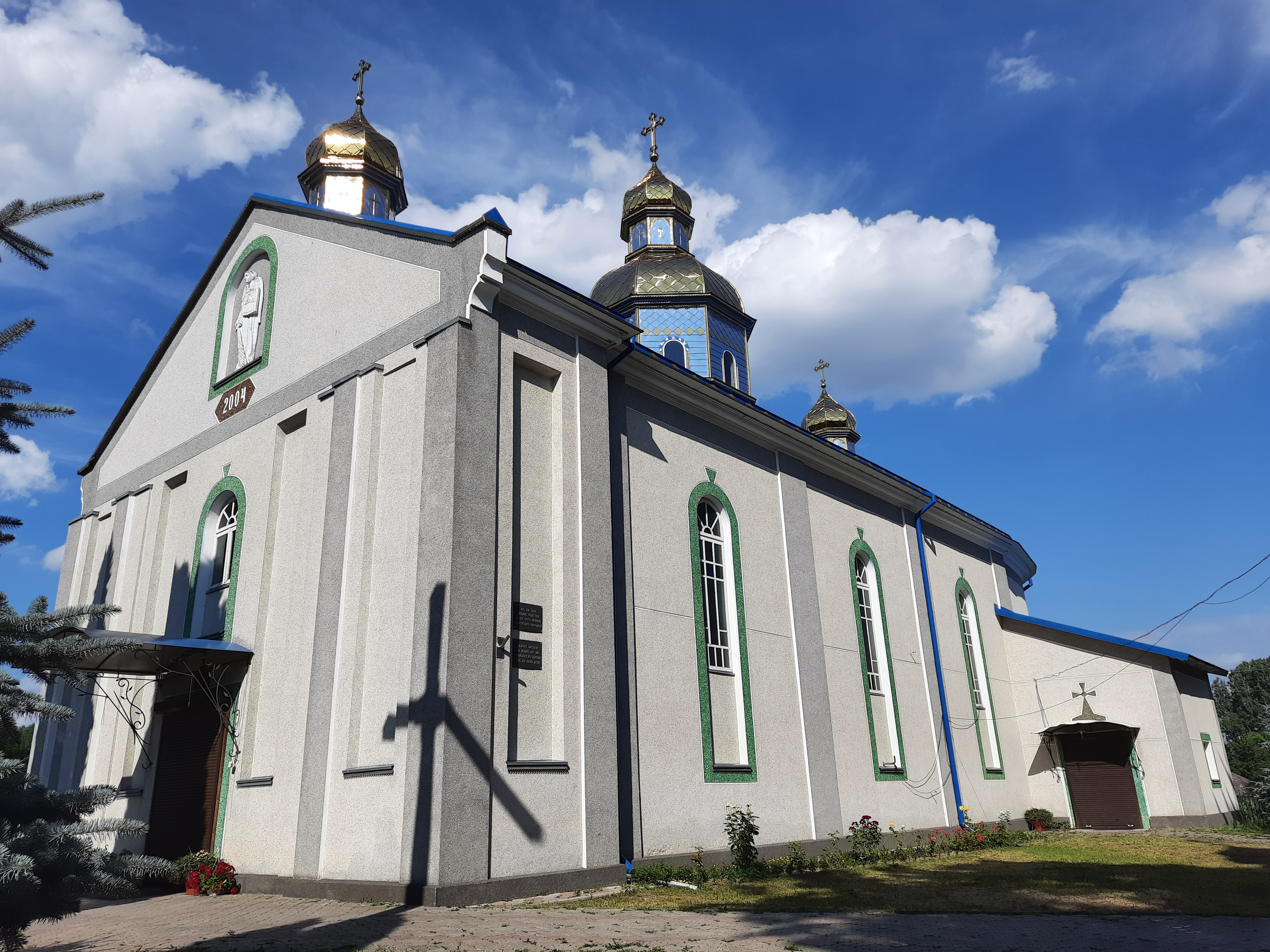
Church of Archangel Michael (1847, restored in 1907)

Ivankiv (Ukrainian: Іванків) is a village in Skala-Podilska settlement hromada, Chortkiv Raion, Ternopil Oblast, Ukraine.

== History ==
It is known from 1576 as a hamlet (according to other sources – 1583).

After the liquidation of the Borshchiv Raion on 19 July 2020, the village became part of the Chortkiv Raion.

== Religion ==
- Saint Michael church (1847, restored in 1907) with a wooden bell tower (17th century)

== Sources ==
- (in Ukrainian) Лашта, В., Іванків // Ternopil Encyclopedic Dictionary: in 4 v. / editorial board: H. Yavorskyi and other, Ternopil: "Zbruch", 2004, V. 1: А—Й, 696 s. — ISBN 966-528-197-6.
- "Iwanków, pow. borszczowski". Geographical Dictionary of the Kingdom of Poland (in Polish). 3. Warszawa: Kasa im. Józefa Mianowskiego. 1882. p. 315.
