= Hans Skopowny =

Ruler of Samogitia

Flag and CoA Samogitia (Zemaitia)

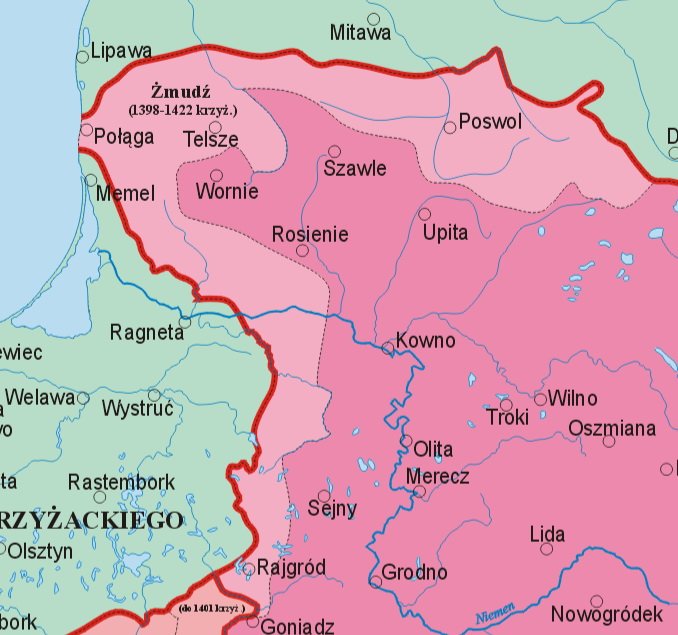
Samogitia (Zemaitia) 1386-1434 AD

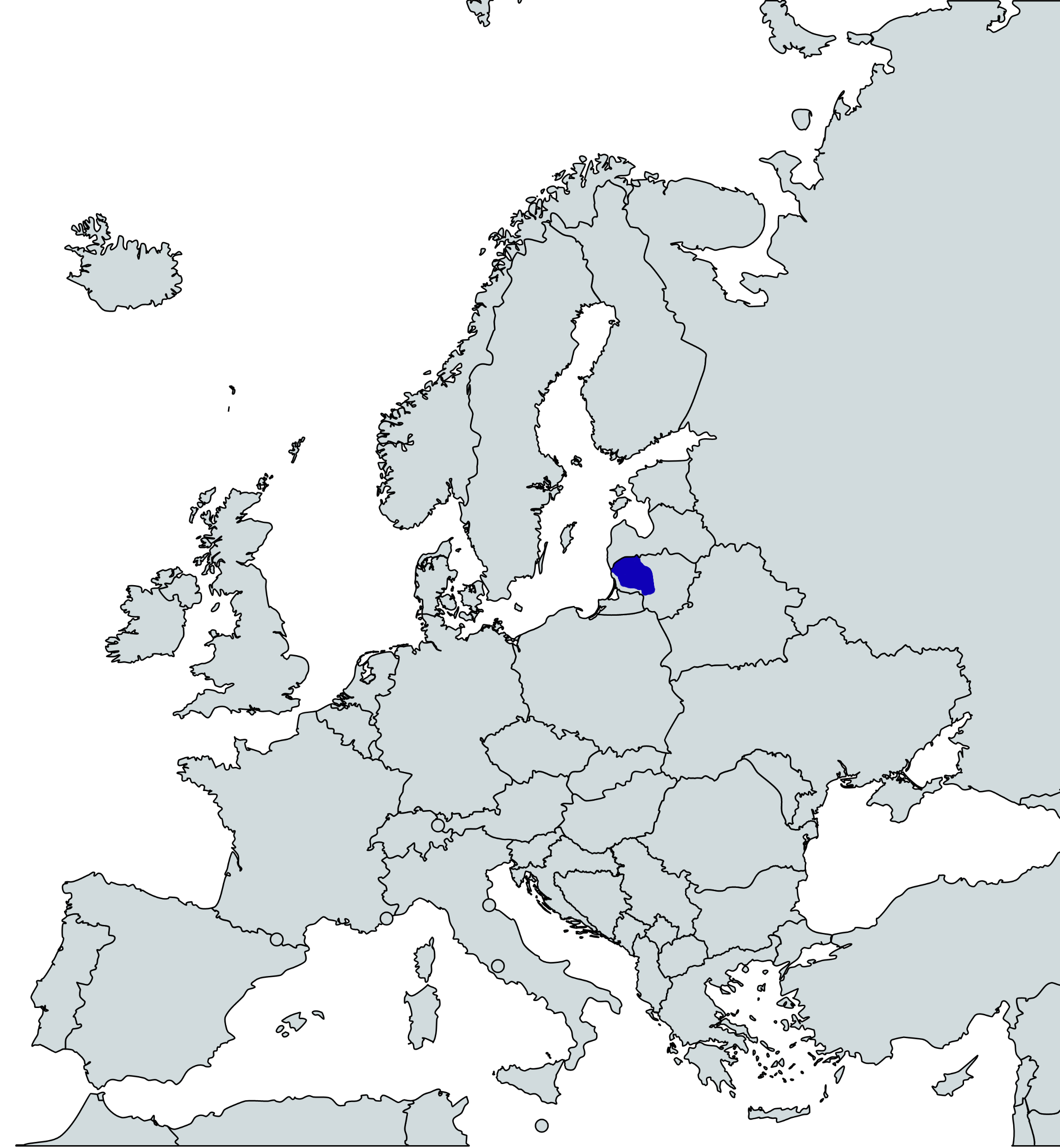
Location of Samogitia/Zemaitia

Hans Skopovny (Johan Skop) (born ~ 1535) – ruler (tiun) of Samogitia in 1567.

== Biography ==
Hans was the son of Stanislav Skop (Skopov) (1492-1554) and Princess Helena Andreevna Sangushko (1494–1561). Stanislav Skop (Trąby) was in 1527-1529 a Royal secretary and Skirsnemunė and Tendziagilski (Samogitia, Tauragė County) ruler (tiun, derzhavtsa). Stanislav Skop was the grandson of Skop (died before 1500) from the old princely dynasty of Dausprungas.

For Princess Helena Andreevna Sangushko this was the second marriage. Her first husband was Prince Peter Timofeevich Massalsky. The parents of Princess Helena Andreevna were Prince Andrei Alexandrovich Sangushko (1454–1534), CoA Pogon and Princess Ksenia-Maria Ivanovna Ostrozhskaya (b. 1458).

The daughter of Hans was Anna Skopovna, who together with her husband Boleslaw Dubikowski (CoA Ostoja), was a Smolensk's Deputy Cup-bearers in the mid-1600s.They owned estate (folvark) Kovalev in Minsk district.
