= Dubivka, Ternopil Oblast =

Rural locality in Ternopil Oblast, Ukraine

Dubivka Дубівка
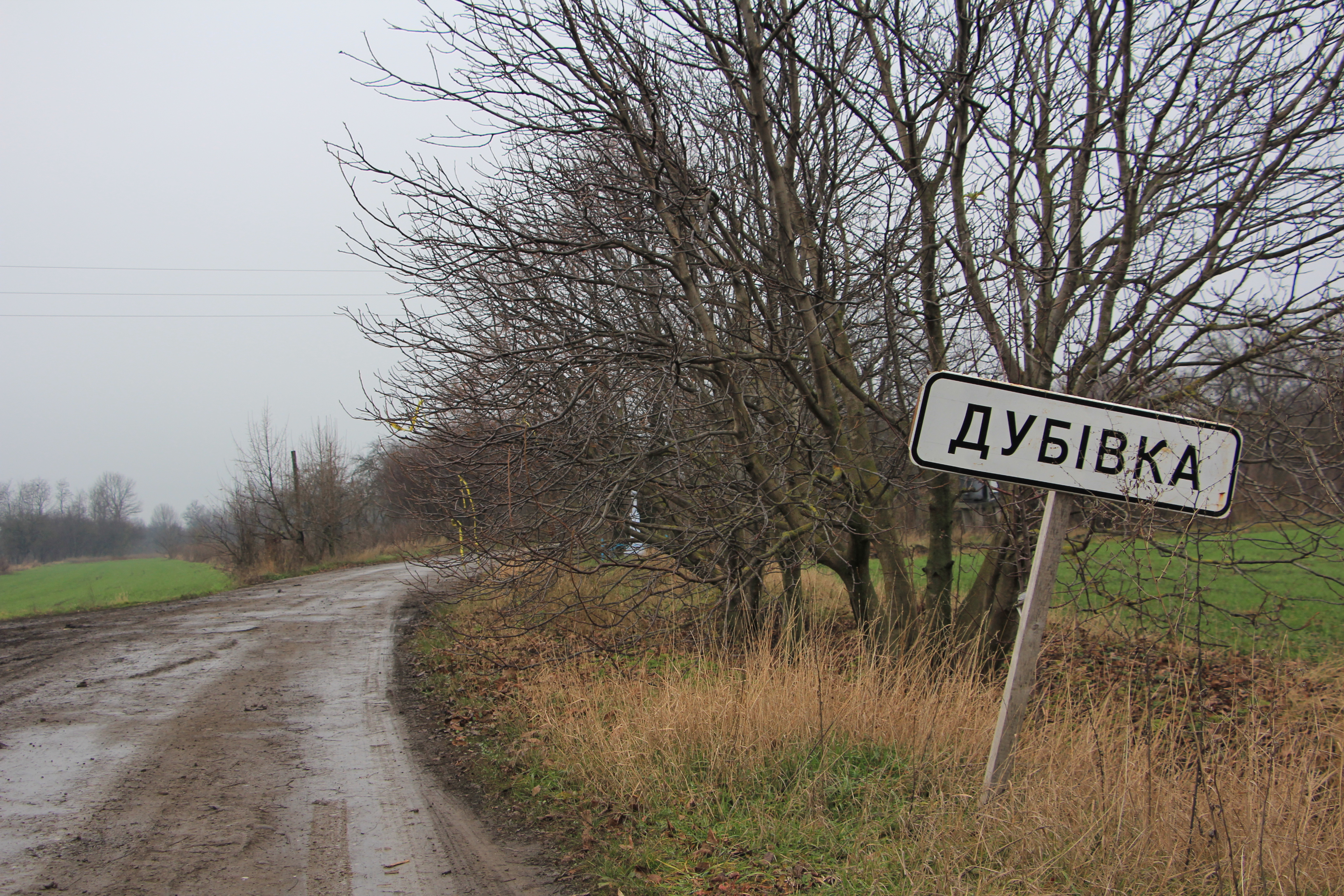
- Road sign at the entrance to Dubivka village

- Location in Ternopil Oblast
- Coordinates: 48°55′47″N 26°7′19″E
- Country: Ukraine
- Oblast: Ternopil Oblast
- Raion: Chortkiv Raion
- Hromada: Skala-Podilska Hromada
- Time zone: UTC+2 (EET)
  - Summer (DST): UTC+3 (EEST)
- Postal code: 48718

Dubivka (Ukrainian: Дубівка) is a village in Skala-Podilska settlement hromada, Chortkiv Raion, Ternopil Oblast, Ukraine.

== History ==
In the 1880s, the landowner Jan Yukhnovych owned 114 morgues of arable land, 18 meadows and vegetable gardens; the peasants owned 160 morgues of arable land, 13 meadows and vegetable gardens.

== Religion ==
- Simeon Stylites church (wooden, transported in 1905 from Tsyhany, Chortkiv Raion)
