= Hushtyn =

Rural locality in Ternopil Oblast, Ukraine

Hushtyn Гуштин
- Church of the Nativity of the Virgin Mary, 2014

- Location in Ternopil Oblast
- Coordinates: 48°53′42″N 26°7′45″E
- Country: Ukraine
- Oblast: Ternopil Oblast
- Raion: Chortkiv Raion
- Hromada: Skala-Podilska settlement hromada
- Time zone: UTC+2 (EET)
  - Summer (DST): UTC+3 (EEST)
- Postal code: 48714

Hushtyn (Ukrainian: Гуштин) is a village in Skala-Podilska settlement hromada, Chortkiv Raion, Ternopil Oblast, Ukraine.

== History ==
During the National Liberation Revolution of the Ukrainian people of 1648–1676, a Cossack detachment of Maksym Kryvonis passed through the village, heading for the cities of Zbarazh and Zboriv.

After the liquidation of the Borshchiv Raion on 19 July 2020, the village became part of the Chortkiv Raion.

== Religion ==
- Church of the Blessed Virgin Mary (early 20th century, wooden)

== Sources ==
- (in Ukrainian) Котик М., Лашта, В., Гуштин // Ternopil Encyclopedic Dictionary: in 4 v. / editorial board: H. Yavorskyi and other, Ternopil: "Zbruch", 2004, V. 1: А—Й, S. 444. — ISBN 966-528-197-6.
- "Gusztyn". Geographical Dictionary of the Kingdom of Poland (in Polish). 2. Warszawa: Kasa im. Józefa Mianowskiego. 1881. p. 915.
