= Triitsia, Ternopil Oblast =

Rural locality in Ternopil Oblast, Ukraine

Triitsia Трійця
- Location in Ternopil Oblast
- Coordinates: 48°47′40″N 26°13′50″E
- Country: Ukraine
- Oblast: Ternopil Oblast
- Raion: Chortkiv Raion
- Hromada: Skala-Podilska settlement hromada
- Time zone: UTC+2 (EET)
  - Summer (DST): UTC+3 (EEST)
- Postal code: 48726

Triitsia (Ukrainian: Трійця) is a village in Skala-Podilska settlement hromada, Chortkiv Raion, Ternopil Oblast, Ukraine.

== History ==
Near the village, archaeological sites of the Holihrad culture were found.

After the liquidation of the Borshchiv Raion on 19 July 2020, the village became part of the Chortkiv Raion.

== Religion ==
- Church of St John the Baptist (1890, rebuilt from a church, brick, UGCC).

== Sources ==
- (in Ukrainian) Ханас, В., Трійця // Ternopil Encyclopedic Dictionary: in 4 v. / editorial board: H. Yavorskyi and other, Ternopil: "Zbruch", 2008, V. 3: П—Я, S. 470. — ISBN 978-966-528-279-2.
- "Trójca 1.), powiat borszczowski". Geographical Dictionary of the Kingdom of Poland (in Polish). 12. Warszawa: Kasa im. Józefa Mianowskiego. 1892. p. 483.
