= Hushtynka =

Rural locality in Ternopil Oblast, Ukraine

Hushtynka Гуштинка
- Location in Ternopil Oblast
- Coordinates: 48°48′53″N 26°11′41″E
- Country: Ukraine
- Oblast: Ternopil Oblast
- Raion: Chortkiv Raion
- Hromada: Skala-Podilska settlement hromada
- Time zone: UTC+2 (EET)
  - Summer (DST): UTC+3 (EEST)
- Postal code: 48726

Hushtynka (Ukrainian: Гуштинка) is a village in Skala-Podilska settlement hromada, Chortkiv Raion, Ternopil Oblast, Ukraine.

== History ==
Near the village, archaeological sites with cultural material from the Trypillian culture, Bronze Age, and Early Iron Age have been discovered.

The first written mention of Hushtynka dates from 1711.

After the liquidation of the Borshchiv Raion on 19 July 2020, the village became part of the Chortkiv Raion.

== Sources ==
- (in Ukrainian) Бігус, М., Гуштинка // Ternopil Encyclopedic Dictionary: in 4 v. / editorial board: H. Yavorskyi and other, Ternopil: "Zbruch", 2004, V. 1: А—Й, 696 s. — ISBN 966-528-197-6.
- "Gusztynek, pow. borszczowski". Geographical Dictionary of the Kingdom of Poland (in Polish). 2. Warszawa: Kasa im. Józefa Mianowskiego. 1881. p. 915.
