= Nyvra =

Rural locality in Ternopil Oblast, Ukraine

Nyvra Нивра
- Location in Ternopil Oblast
- Coordinates: 48°43′4″N 26°13′7″E
- Country: Ukraine
- Oblast: Ternopil Oblast
- Raion: Chortkiv Raion
- Hromada: Skala-Podilska settlement hromada
- Time zone: UTC+2 (EET)
  - Summer (DST): UTC+3 (EEST)
- Postal code: 48740

Nyvra (Ukrainian: Нивра) is a village in Skala-Podilska settlement hromada, Chortkiv Raion, Ternopil Oblast, Ukraine.

== History ==
The first written mention is from 1500.

After the liquidation of the Borshchiv Raion on 19 July 2020, the village became part of the Chortkiv Raion.

== Religion ==
- two churches of Saint Michael (1718, brick, OCU; 1937, converted from a Roman Catholic church, brick, UGCC).

== Sources ==
- (in Ukrainian) Волощук В., Уніят, В., Нивра // Ternopil Encyclopedic Dictionary: in 4 v. / editorial board: H. Yavorskyi and other, Ternopil: "Zbruch", 2005, V. 2: К—О, S. 627—628. — ISBN 966-528-199-2.
- "Niwra". Geographical Dictionary of the Kingdom of Poland (in Polish). 7. Warszawa: Kasa im. Józefa Mianowskiego. 1886. p. 165.
