= Simeon Stylites Church, Dubivka, Ternopil Oblast =

Greek Catholic church in Dubivka, Ukraine

Simeon Stylites Church
- Церква преподобного Семиона Стовпника
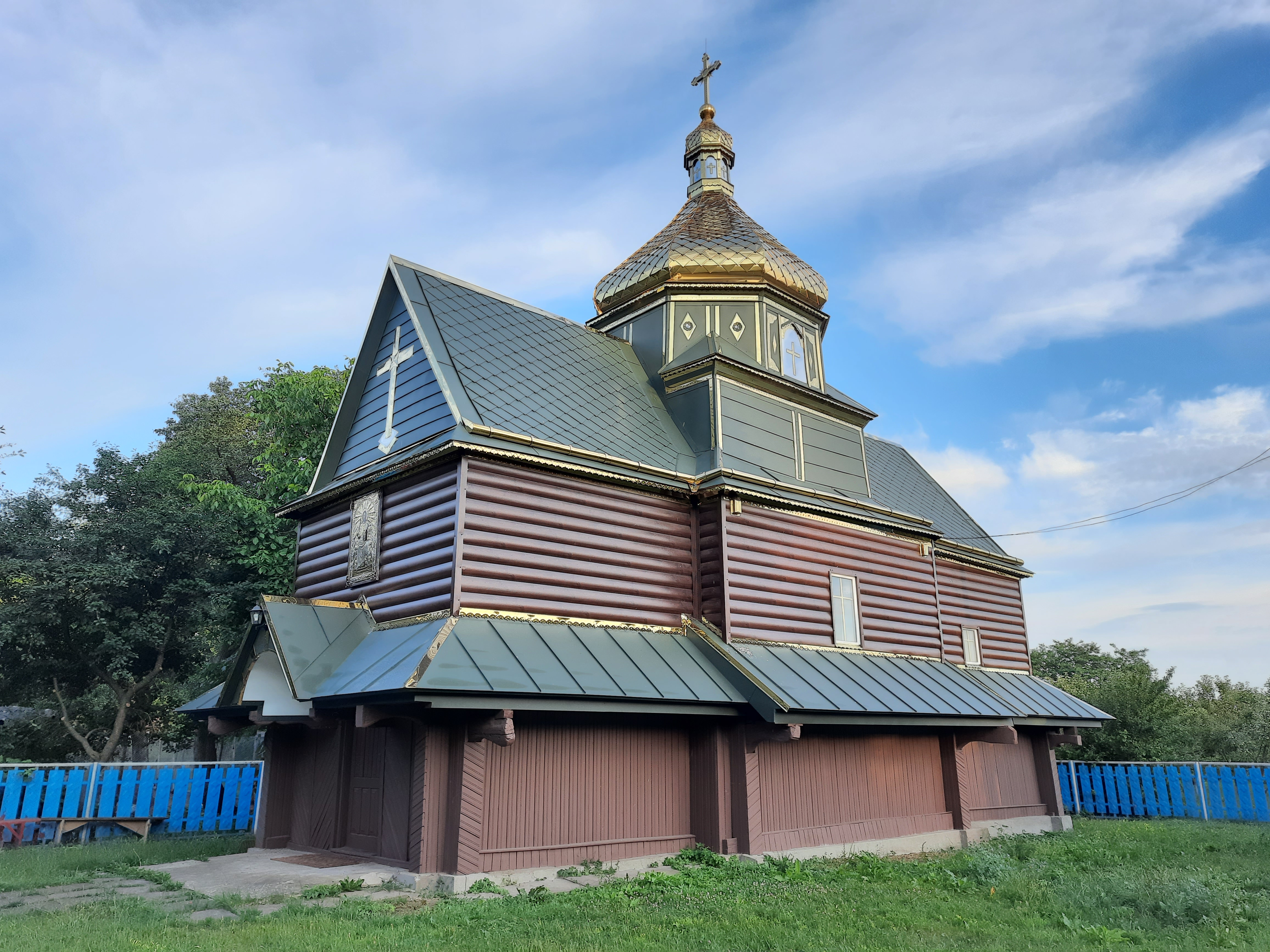

- Location within Ternopil Oblast

Religion
- Affiliation: Ukrainian Greek Catholic Church

Location
- Location: Dubivka
- Coordinates: 48°55′55″N 26°07′10″E

Simeon Stylites Church (Ukrainian: Церква преподобного Семиона Стовпника) is a Greek Catholic parish church (UGCC) in Dubivka of the Skala-Podilska settlement hromada of the Chortkiv Raion of the Ternopil Oblast, and an architectural monument of local importance.

== History ==
According to legend, the church in the village of Dubivka was built from wooden logs that were initially used for a church in Skala-Podilska, and then in Tsyhany. It was under the protection of Saint Nicholas the Wonderworker. In 1895, the prominent Ukrainian poet Ivan Franko read the liturgical book "Apostol" in this church and sang with the choir.

When a new stone church was consecrated in Tsyhany in 1905, the wooden one was dismantled and moved to Dubivka. The main benefactor was Semen Velychko, who donated land and made a significant contribution. In gratitude, on 14 September 1909, after the construction was completed, the church was consecrated on the feast of Saint Simeon the Pillar.

The priest traveled from the village of Bosyry to conduct services. Father Severyn Matkovskyi made a significant contribution to the development of the parish. During the World War II, a shell hit the sacristy, but the fire, miraculously, did not cause much damage.

Until 1946, the parish and the church belonged to the UGCC, and from 1946 to 1957, they belonged to the Russian Orthodox Church.

From 1957 to 1990, the church was closed by state authorities.

In 1990, the parish and the church returned to the UGCC.

On 31 October 2021, the restored church and the new stone bell tower were consecrated with the participation of the clergy. The donors were the villagers and Vasyl Hradovyi, the director of PAP "Dzvin". The restoration work was managed by Oleh Hundzyk, and former villagers Stepan Dytko and Lesia Kolomyia donated a bell.

== Priests ==
- at. Saveryn Matkovskyi (1909–1932)
- at. Volodymyr Kovalskyi (until 1957)
- at. Yosyp Antkiv (1990–1999)
- at. Oleh Sushelnytskyi (since 14 October 1999)

== Sources ==
- (in Ukrainian) Г. Івахів, Н. Мизак, Дубівка // Ternopil Oblast. History of cities and villages: in 3 v. / Ternopil: "Terno-graph", 2014, V. 1: А—В, S. 501—503. — ISBN 978-966-457-228-3.
