= Saint Anthony Church, Losiach =

Church in Losiach, Ukraine

Saint Anthony Church
- Костел Святого Антонія
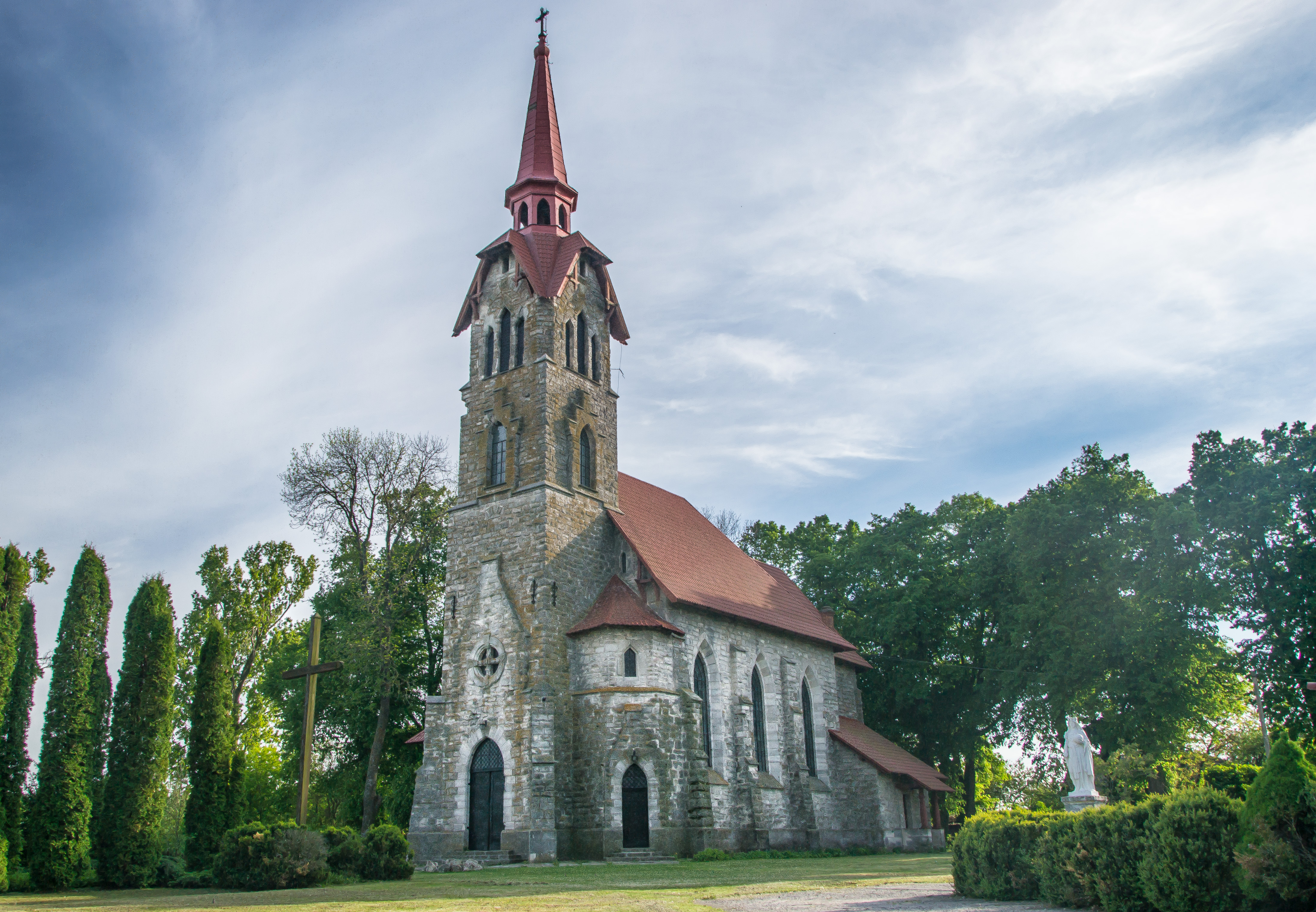

- Location within Ternopil Oblast

Location
- Location: Losiach
- Interactive map of Saint Anthony Church
- Coordinates: 48°54′27″N 26°05′19″E

Architecture
- Completed: 1889

Saint Anthony Church (Ukrainian: Костел Святого Антонія) is a Roman Catholic parish church in Losiach, Ternopil Oblast. An architectural monument of local importance.

== History ==
The construction of the church was completed in 1889 at the expense of Countess Maria Gołuchowski.

The parish was established in 1909. In 1912, the parish priest was Kazimierz Halicki, who was ordained in 1903 in Lviv. He served until his death in 1953. The church was consecrated in 1932 by Archbishop Bolesław Twardowski.

In 1960, when there were only six active churches left in the Ternopil Oblast, the parish had 117 parishioners, and in 1962, 110. As it was the smallest of the active parishes, the regional representative proposed that it be removed from the register. Until 1963, the parish priest was Józef Adamczyk, who was also the Roman Catholic parish priest in Borshchiv and Rydoduby. After his death, Masses were celebrated only a few times a year. The faithful gathered for prayers on their own. Finally, in 1974, on the grounds of missing documentation and the lack of a permanent parish priest, the parish was removed from the register. The church was converted into a warehouse for agricultural machinery. It was returned to the faithful in 1990. In 2006, the parish had 62 members.

== Description ==
The church was built of hewn stone and is distinguished by its buttressed walls and high red-tiled roof. The facade is decorated with a massive quadrangular tower. The interior contains an altar that was originally a side altar in the Roman Catholic church in Borshchiv.

== Priests ==
- Kazimierz Halicki (1912–1953)
- Józef Adamczyk
- Józef Czarnik (1991–2010)
- Włodzimierz Strogusz (2010–2017)
- Wiktor Gołub (2017–at present)
