= Pidpylypia, Ternopil Oblast =

Rural locality in Ternopil Oblast, Ukraine

Pidpylypia Підпилип'я
- Location in Ternopil Oblast
- Coordinates: 48°46′9″N 26°14′12″E
- Country: Ukraine
- Oblast: Ternopil Oblast
- Raion: Chortkiv Raion
- Hromada: Skala-Podilska settlement hromada
- Time zone: UTC+2 (EET)
  - Summer (DST): UTC+3 (EEST)
- Postal code: 48726

Pidpylypia (Ukrainian: Підпилип'я) is a village in Skala-Podilska settlement hromada, Chortkiv Raion, Ternopil Oblast, Ukraine.

== History ==
The first written mention is from 1493.

After the liquidation of the Borshchiv Raion on 19 July 2020, the village became part of the Chortkiv Raion.

== Religion ==
- Saint Anthony church (1927, brick, OCU).

== Sources ==
- (in Ukrainian) Бондар А., Уніят В., Підпилип'я // Ternopil Encyclopedic Dictionary: in 4 v. / editorial board: H. Yavorskyi and other, Ternopil: "Zbruch", 2008, V. 3: П—Я, S. 85. — ISBN 978-966-528-279-2.
- "Podfilipie, wś, powiat borszczowski, nad Zbruczem". Geographical Dictionary of the Kingdom of Poland (in Polish). 8. Warszawa: Kasa im. Józefa Mianowskiego. 1887. p. 376.
