= Zaluchchia, Ternopil Oblast =

Rural locality in Ternopil Oblast, Ukraine

Zaluchchia Залуччя
- Location in Ternopil Oblast
- Coordinates: 48°44′30″N 26°13′56″E
- Country: Ukraine
- Oblast: Ternopil Oblast
- Raion: Chortkiv Raion
- Hromada: Skala-Podilska settlement hromada
- Time zone: UTC+2 (EET)
  - Summer (DST): UTC+3 (EEST)
- Postal code: 48740

Zaluchchia (Ukrainian: Залуччя) is a village in Skala-Podilska settlement hromada, Chortkiv Raion, Ternopil Oblast, Ukraine.

== History ==
The first written mention is from 1494.

After the liquidation of the Borshchiv Raion on 19 July 2020, the village became part of the Chortkiv Raion.

== Religion ==
- Saint Michael church (1709, brick, UGCC).

== Sources ==
- (in Ukrainian) Бігус М., Карпович, В., Залуччя // Ternopil Encyclopedic Dictionary: in 4 v. / editorial board: H. Yavorskyi and other, Ternopil: "Zbruch", 2004, V. 1: А—Й, S. 613. — ISBN 966-528-197-6.
- "Załucze (1), wś, pow. borszczowski". Geographical Dictionary of the Kingdom of Poland (in Polish). 14. Warszawa: Kasa im. Józefa Mianowskiego. 1895. p. 357.
