= Turylche =

Rural locality in Ternopil Oblast, Ukraine

Turylche Турильче
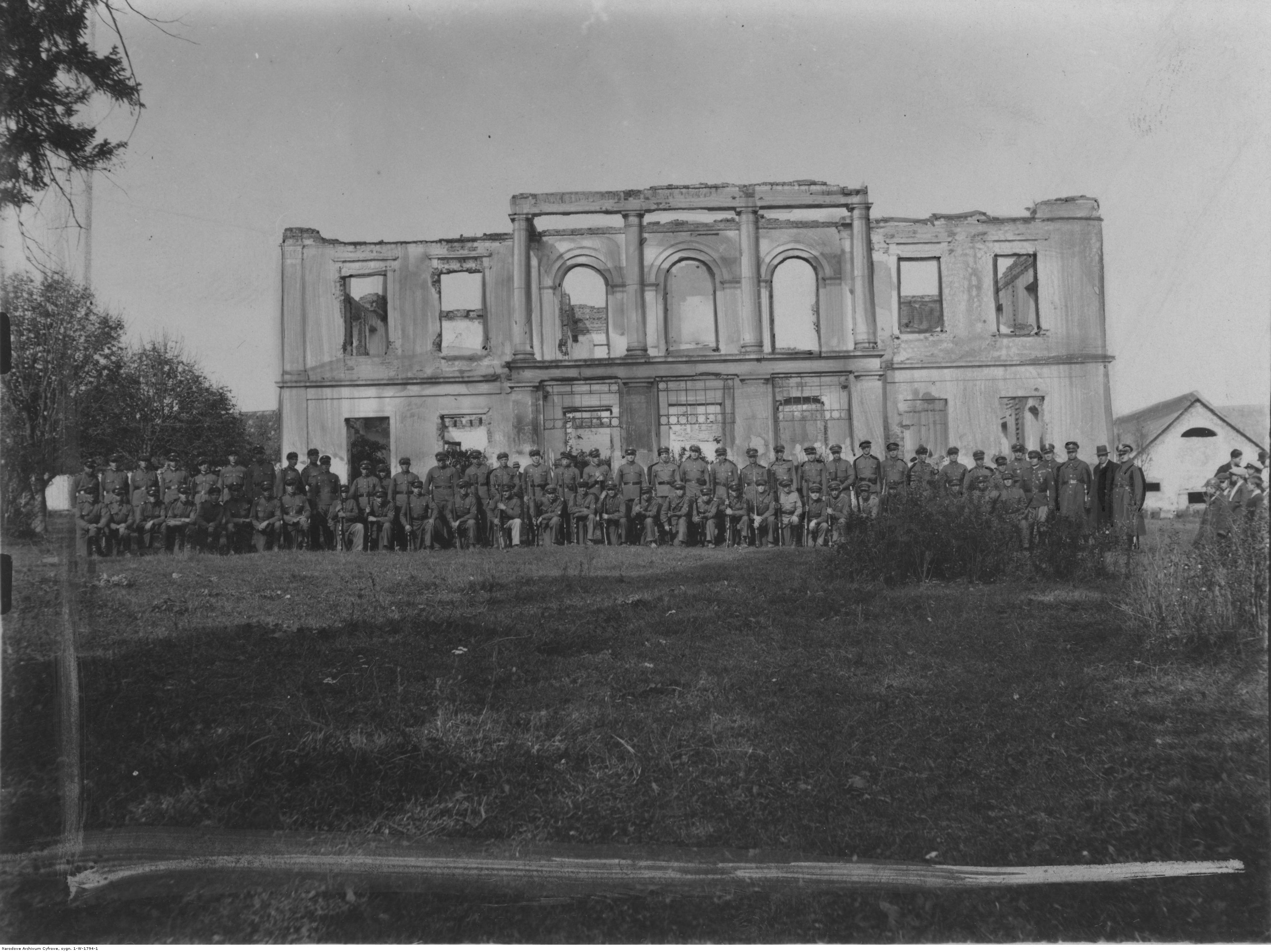
- Celebrations of the 10th anniversary of the Border Protection Corps in the KOP company stationed in Turylcz. Group photograph of the company of shooters against the background of the ruins of the castle in Turylcz; 1934 Illustrated Courier Courier -

- Location in Ternopil Oblast
- Coordinates: 48°46′32″N 26°12′7″E
- Country: Ukraine
- Oblast: Ternopil Oblast
- Raion: Chortkiv Raion
- Hromada: Skala-Podilska settlement hromada
- Time zone: UTC+2 (EET)
  - Summer (DST): UTC+3 (EEST)
- Postal code: 48726

Turylche (Ukrainian: Турильче) is a village in Skala-Podilska settlement hromada, Chortkiv Raion, Ternopil Oblast, Ukraine.

== History ==
The first written mention is from 1462.

After the liquidation of the Borshchiv Raion on 19 July 2020, the village became part of the Chortkiv Raion.

== Religion ==
- two churches of the Nativity of the Blessed Virgin Mary (1871, brick, OCU; UGCC);
- Roman Catholic Church (1871).

== Sources ==
- (in Ukrainian) Новосядла Н., Уніят, В., Турильче // Ternopil Encyclopedic Dictionary: in 4 v. / editorial board: H. Yavorskyi and other, Ternopil: "Zbruch", 2008, V. 3: П—Я, S. 477. — ISBN 978-966-528-279-2.
- "Turylcze". Geographical Dictionary of the Kingdom of Poland (in Polish). 12. Warszawa: Kasa im. Józefa Mianowskiego. 1892. p. 659.
