= Losiach =

Rural locality in Ternopil Oblast, Ukraine

Losiach Лосяч
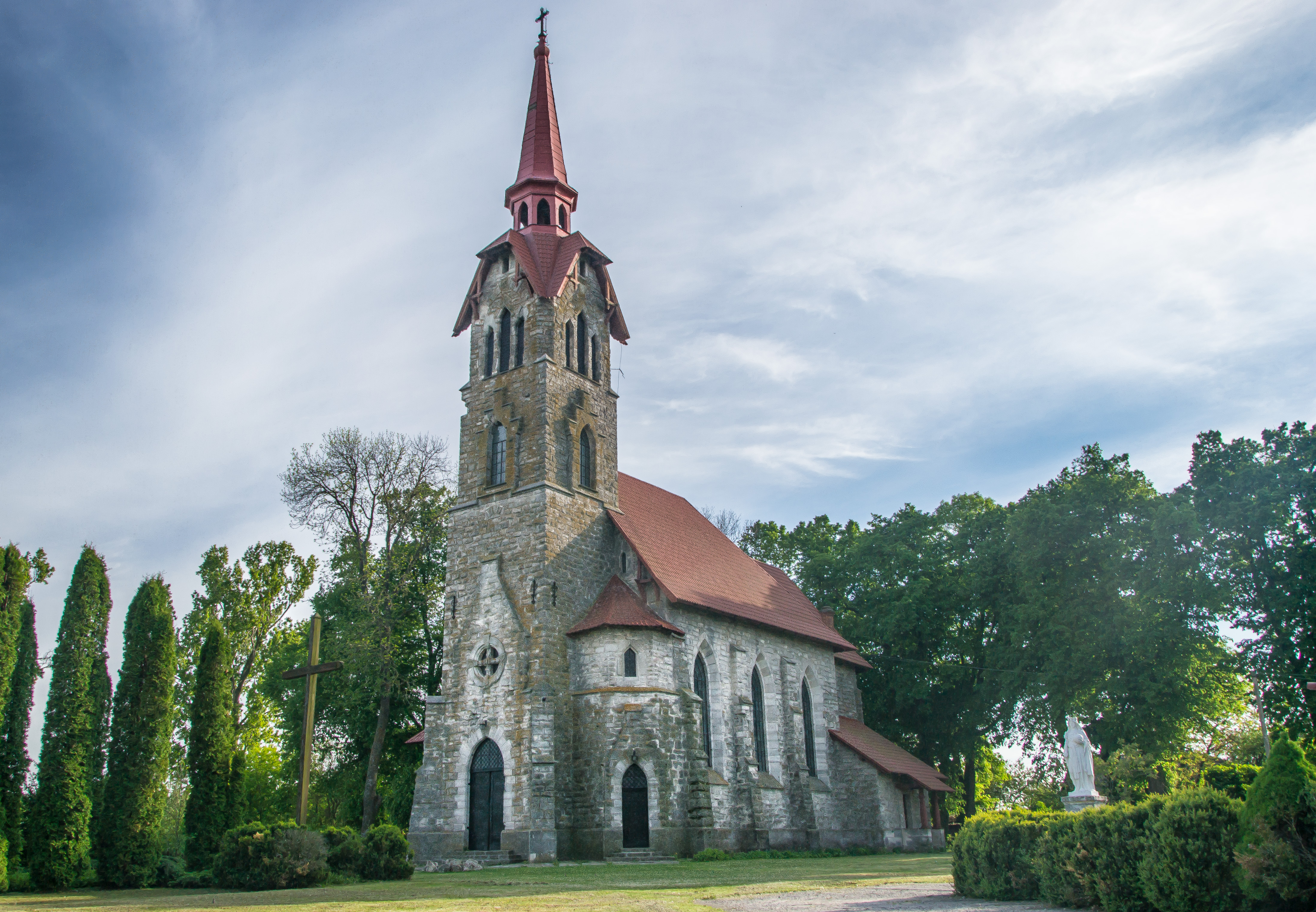
- Roman Catholic Church of St. Anthony

- Location in Ternopil Oblast
- Coordinates: 48°54′55″N 26°4′46″E
- Country: Ukraine
- Oblast: Ternopil Oblast
- Raion: Chortkiv Raion
- Hromada: Skala-Podilska settlement hromada
- Time zone: UTC+2 (EET)
  - Summer (DST): UTC+3 (EEST)
- Postal code: 48710

Losiach (Ukrainian: Лосяч) is a village in Skala-Podilska settlement hromada, Chortkiv Raion, Ternopil Oblast, Ukraine.

== History ==
Near the village, archaeological monuments of ancient Rus' culture were discovered, in particular, in 1877, archaeologist Adam Kirkor, who found a human skeleton with a bronze ring on his finger under a large stone slab.

The village has been known from 1540.

After the liquidation of the Borshchiv Raion on 19 July 2020, the village became part of the Chortkiv Raion.

== Religion ==
- two stone churches of the Exaltation of the Holy Cross (1903, OCU; 2007, UGCC)
- Saint Anthony Church (1872, RCC)

== Sources ==
- (in Ukrainian) Бігус М., Шишкевич, Г., Лосяч // Ternopil Encyclopedic Dictionary: in 4 v. / editorial board: H. Yavorskyi and other, Ternopil: "Zbruch", 2005, V. 2: К—О, S. 393. — ISBN 966-528-199-2.
- "Łosiacz, wś w pow. borszczowskim". Geographical Dictionary of the Kingdom of Poland (in Polish). 5. Warszawa: Kasa im. Józefa Mianowskiego. 1884. p. 731.
