= Berezhanka, Chortkiv Raion, Ternopil Oblast =

Rural locality in Ternopil Oblast, Ukraine

Berezhanka Бережанка
- Location in Ternopil Oblast
- Coordinates: 48°48′59″N 26°14′06″E
- Country: Ukraine
- Oblast: Ternopil Oblast
- Raion: Chortkiv Raion
- Hromada: Skala-Podilska settlement hromada
- Time zone: UTC+2 (EET)
  - Summer (DST): UTC+3 (EEST)
- Postal code: 48726

Berezhanka (Ukrainian: Бережанка) is a village in Skala-Podilska settlement hromada, Chortkiv Raion, Ternopil Oblast, Ukraine.

== History ==
The village is known from 1548.

After the liquidation of the Borshchiv Raion on 19 July 2020, the village became part of the Chortkiv Raion.

== Religion ==
- Church of the Intercession (1927, OCU, brick),
- Church of the Holy Trinity (1930s, RCC, restored in the 1990s).

== Sources ==
- (in Ukrainian) Ханас, В., Бережанка // Ternopil Encyclopedic Dictionary: in 4 v. / editorial board: H. Yavorskyi and other, Ternopil: "Zbruch", 2004, V. 1: А—Й, S. 105. — ISBN 966-528-197-6.
- "Bereżanka, wś, pow. borszczowski". Geographical Dictionary of the Kingdom of Poland (in Polish). 1. Warszawa: Kasa im. Józefa Mianowskiego. 1880. p. 149.
