= Skala-Podilska settlement hromada =

Hromada in Ternopil Oblast, Ukraine

Skala-Podilska settlement hromada Скала-Подільська селищна громада
- hromada
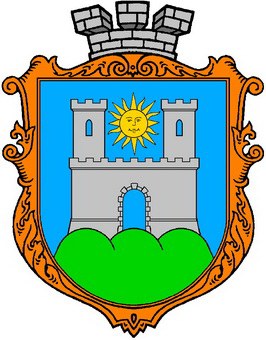
- Seal

- Location within Ternopil Oblast Location within Ukraine
- Coordinates: 48°51′06″N 26°12′04″E
- Country: Ukraine
- Oblast: Ternopil Oblast
- Raion: Chortkiv Raion
- Administrative center: Skala-Podilska

Government
  - Hromada head: Ihor Loboda

Area
  - Total: 184.9 km^{2} (71.4 sq mi)

Population (2022)
  - Total: 10,062
- Urban-type settlement: 1
- Villages: 14
- Website: skalapodilska-gromada.gov.ua

Skala-Podilska settlement hromada (Ukrainian: Скала-Подільська селищна територіальна громада, romanized: Skala-Podilska selyshchna terytorialna hromada is a hromada in Ukraine, in Chortkiv Raion of Ternopil Oblast. The administrative center is the urban-type settlement of Skala-Podilska. Its population is 10,062 (2022 estimate)

It was formed on 17 July 2015 by amalgamation of Skala-Podilsk town council and Hushtyn, Ivankiv, Losyas, Nyvra, Turylche village councils of Borshchiv Raion.

== Settlements ==
The hromada consists of 1 urban-type settlement (Skala-Podilska) and 14 villages:

- Berezhanka
- Burdiakivtsi
- Verbivka
- Hushtyn
- Hushtynka
- Dubivka
- Zaluchchia
- Zbryzh
- Ivankiv
- Losiach
- Nyvra
- Pidpylypia
- Triitsia
- Turylche
