= Zbryzh, Ternopil Oblast =

Rural locality in Ternopil Oblast, Ukraine

Zbryzh Збриж
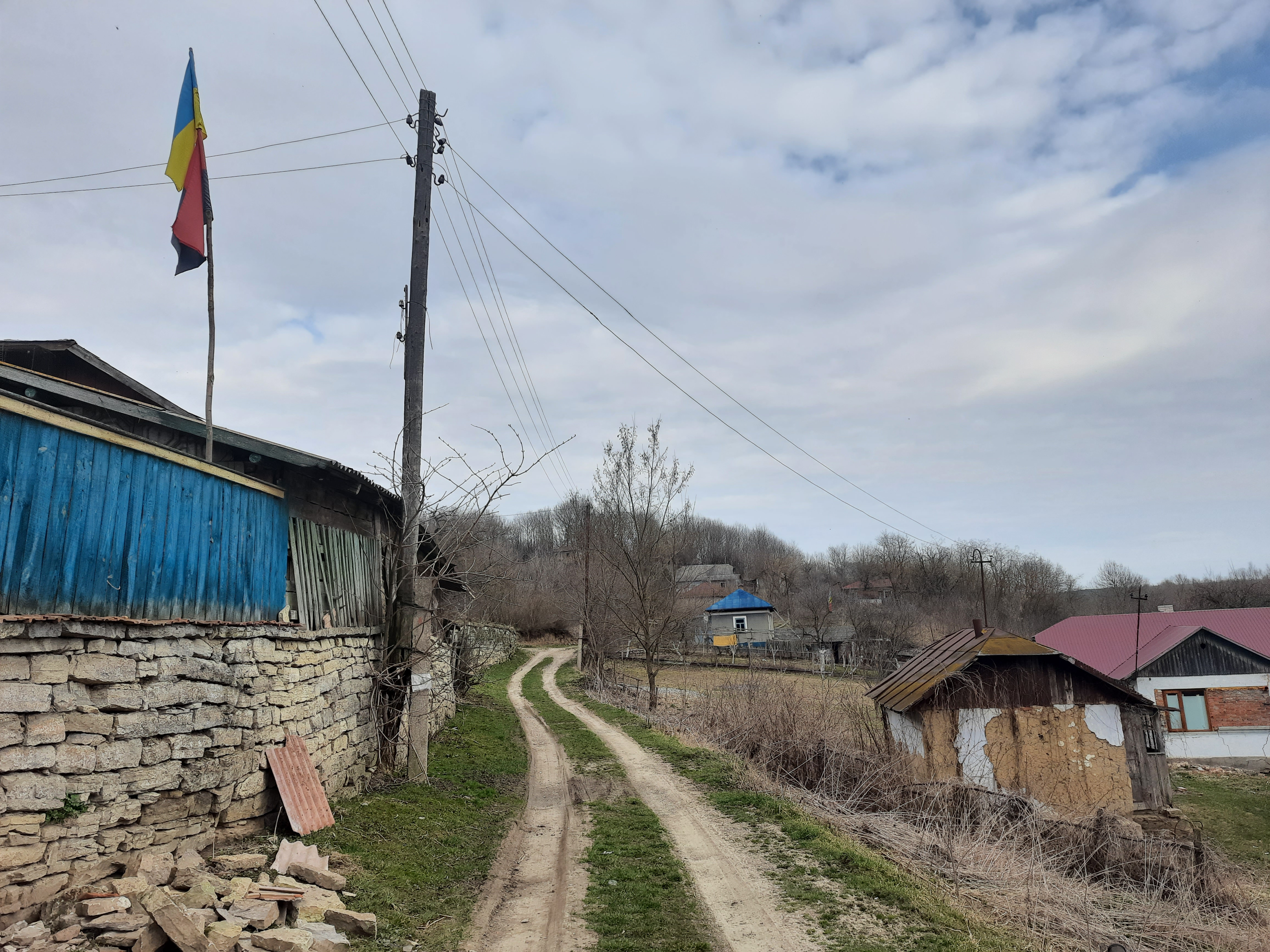
- Village street

- Location in Ternopil Oblast
- Coordinates: 48°54′32″N 26°10′59″E
- Country: Ukraine
- Oblast: Ternopil Oblast
- Raion: Chortkiv Raion
- Hromada: Skala-Podilska settlement hromada
- Time zone: UTC+2 (EET)
  - Summer (DST): UTC+3 (EEST)
- Postal code: 48715

Zbryzh (Ukrainian: Збриж) is a village in Skala-Podilska settlement hromada, Chortkiv Raion, Ternopil Oblast, Ukraine.

== History ==
The first written mention dates back to 1646. On 27 July 1672, the German traveler and diplomat Ulrich von Werdum visited the townlet and wrote about it in his diary.

In the 18th century it was a village again.

After the liquidation of the Borshchiv Raion on 19 July 2020, the village became part of the Chortkiv Raion.

== Sources ==
- (in Ukrainian) Лашта, В., Збриж // Ternopil Encyclopedic Dictionary: in 4 v. / editorial board: H. Yavorskyi and other, Ternopil: "Zbruch", 2004, V. 1: А—Й, S. 640. — ISBN 966-528-197-6.
- "Zbrzyź". Geographical Dictionary of the Kingdom of Poland (in Polish). 14. Warszawa: Kasa im. Józefa Mianowskiego. 1895. p. 5323.
