= St. Simeon's and St. Anne's Cathedral Church, Tallinn =

Church building in Tallinn, Estonia

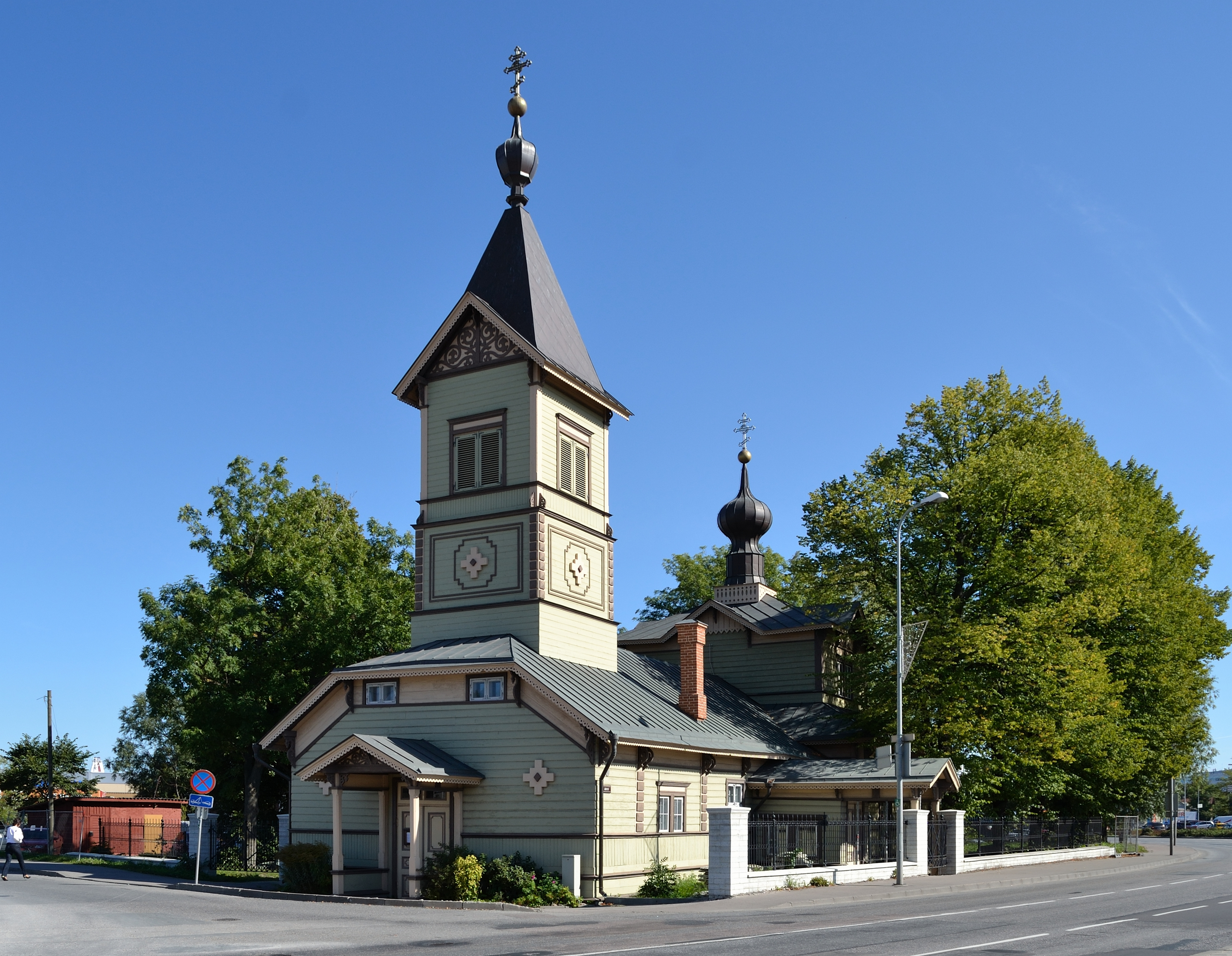
- St. Simeon's and St. Anne's Cathedral Church
- St. Simeon's and St. Anne's Cathedral Church, Tallinn
- 59°26′24″N 24°45′37″E

St. Simeon's and St. Anne's Cathedral Church (Estonian: Tallinna Püha Siimeoni ja Naisprohvet Hanna kirik, lit. 'Church of St. Simeon and the Prophetess Anna in Tallinn') is an Eastern Orthodox church in Tallinn, Estonia. Construction of the original church on the site began in c. 1752, and it was consecrated in 1755. It was remodelled and extended in the 1870s. After being decommissioned in 1963 in the antireligion-era of Soviet control, it was used for various purposes while not under church authority. The fabric of the building was greatly altered during this period. In 1999, the process of returning the property to the Eastern Orthodox Church began, and since then it has been used by a congregation of the autonomous Estonian Orthodox Church (EAOK). Now a constituent parish and cathedral church of the EAOK archdiocese of Tallinn, it was extensively restored early in the 21st century. The church is dedicated to the saints Simeon the God-receiver and Anna the Prophetess, both New Testament figures who appear in the Gospel of Luke.

== History ==
The church represents historicism style.

First certain proofs about Simenon congregation and its church building goes back to the beginning of 18th century. There are no descriptions about how this church building looked like. In 1870s, the original church building was rebuilt.

Before 1919, the church was occupied by Russian navy congregation. After that, the church has been belonged to a congregation of the autonomous Estonian Orthodox Church.

The church is chosen one of the Estonian cultural monuments being an architectural monument.

== Gallery ==
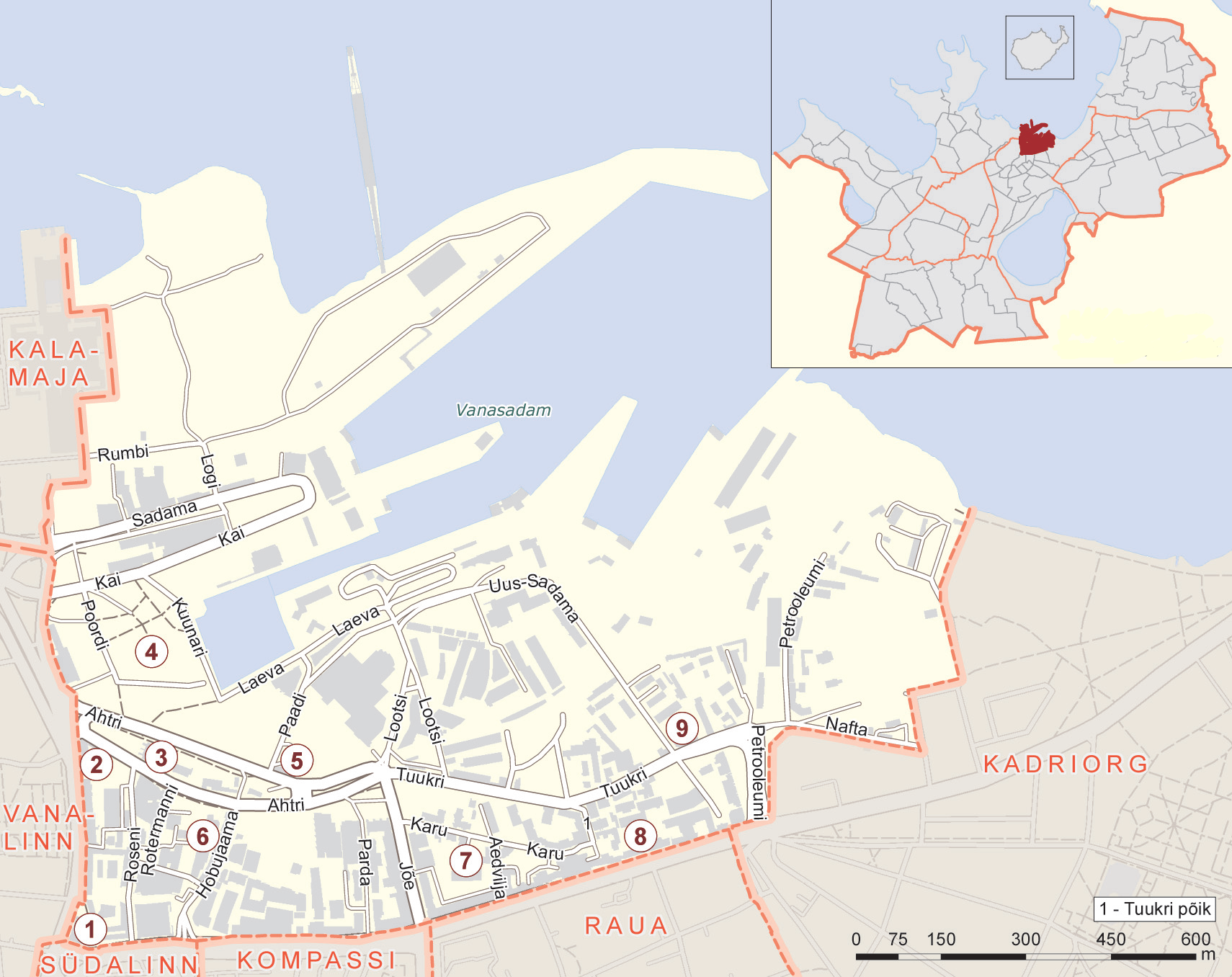
Location of church on Tallinn waterfront indicated on map as '5', at the junction of Ahtri and Paadi Streets

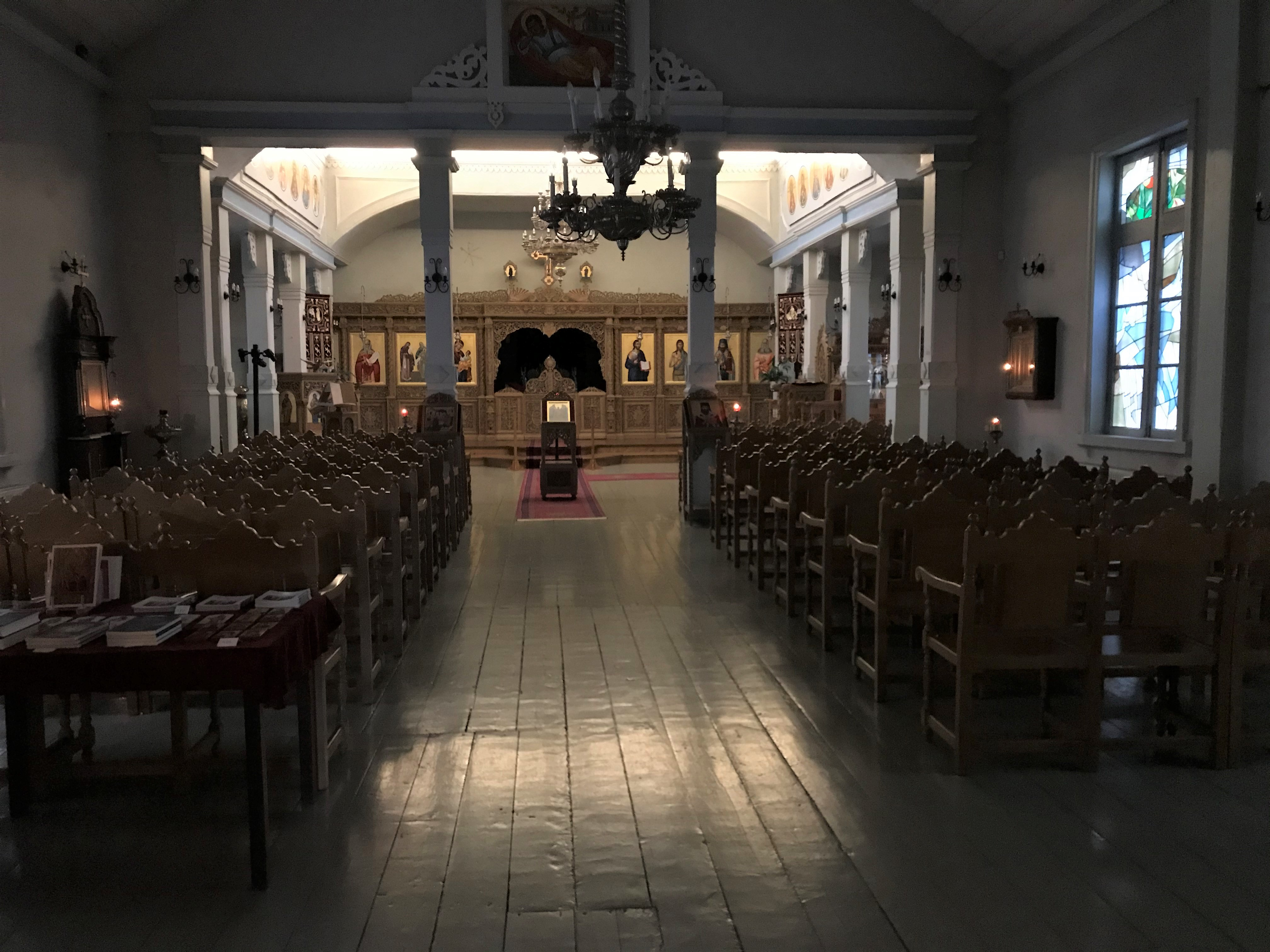
Interior view looking towards the sanctuary

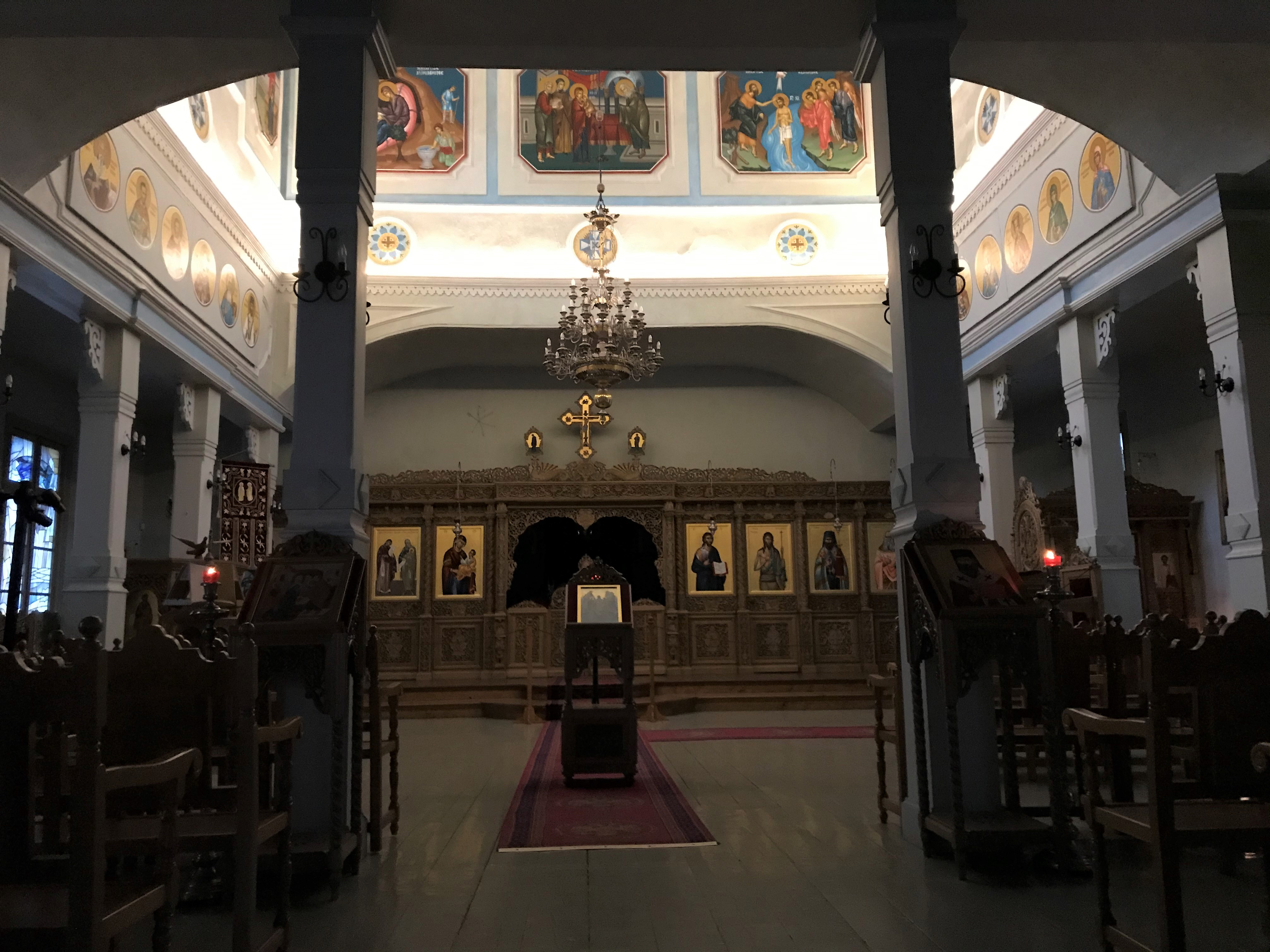
Interior view from the nave

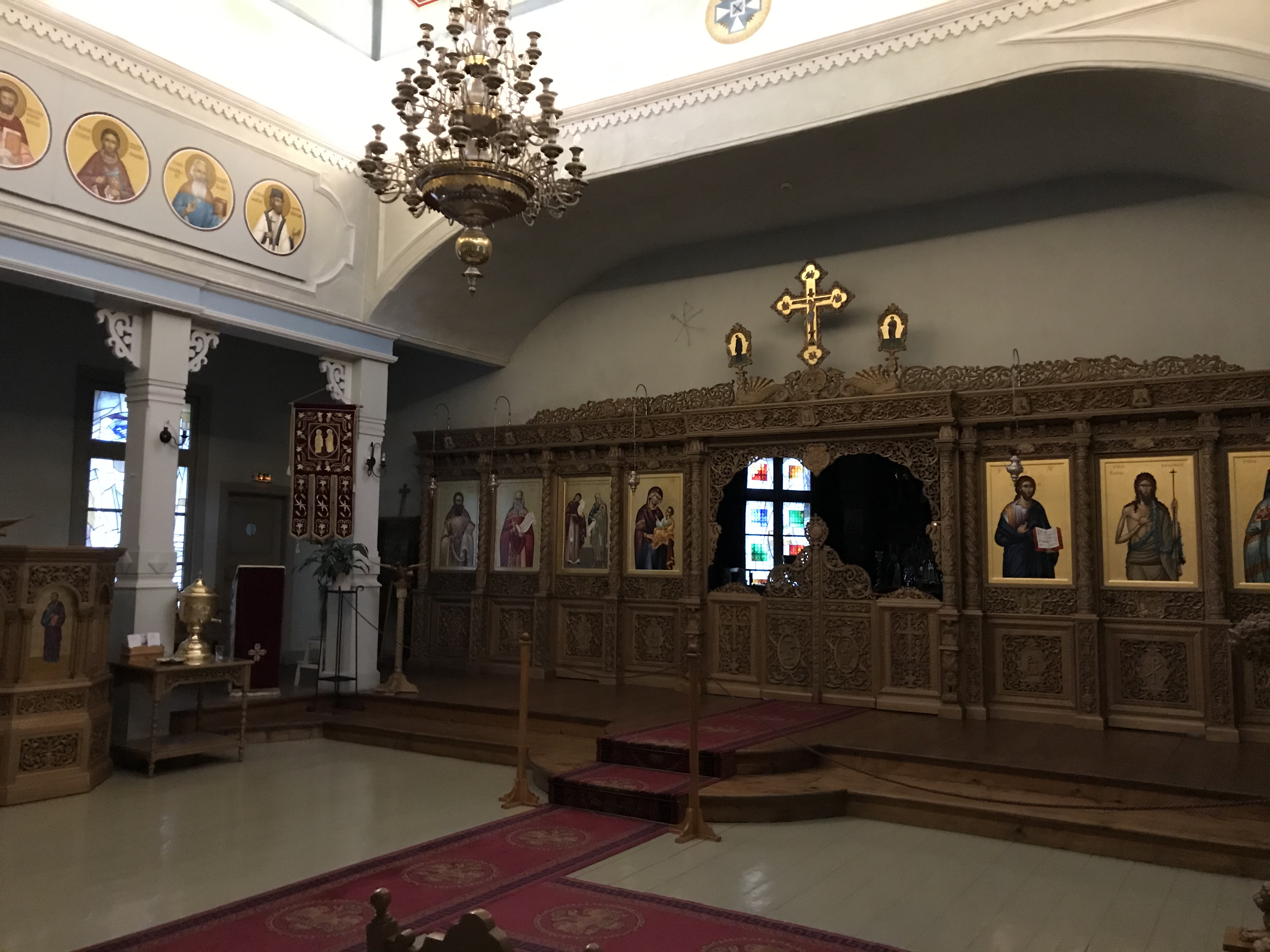
Interior view showing the iconostasis

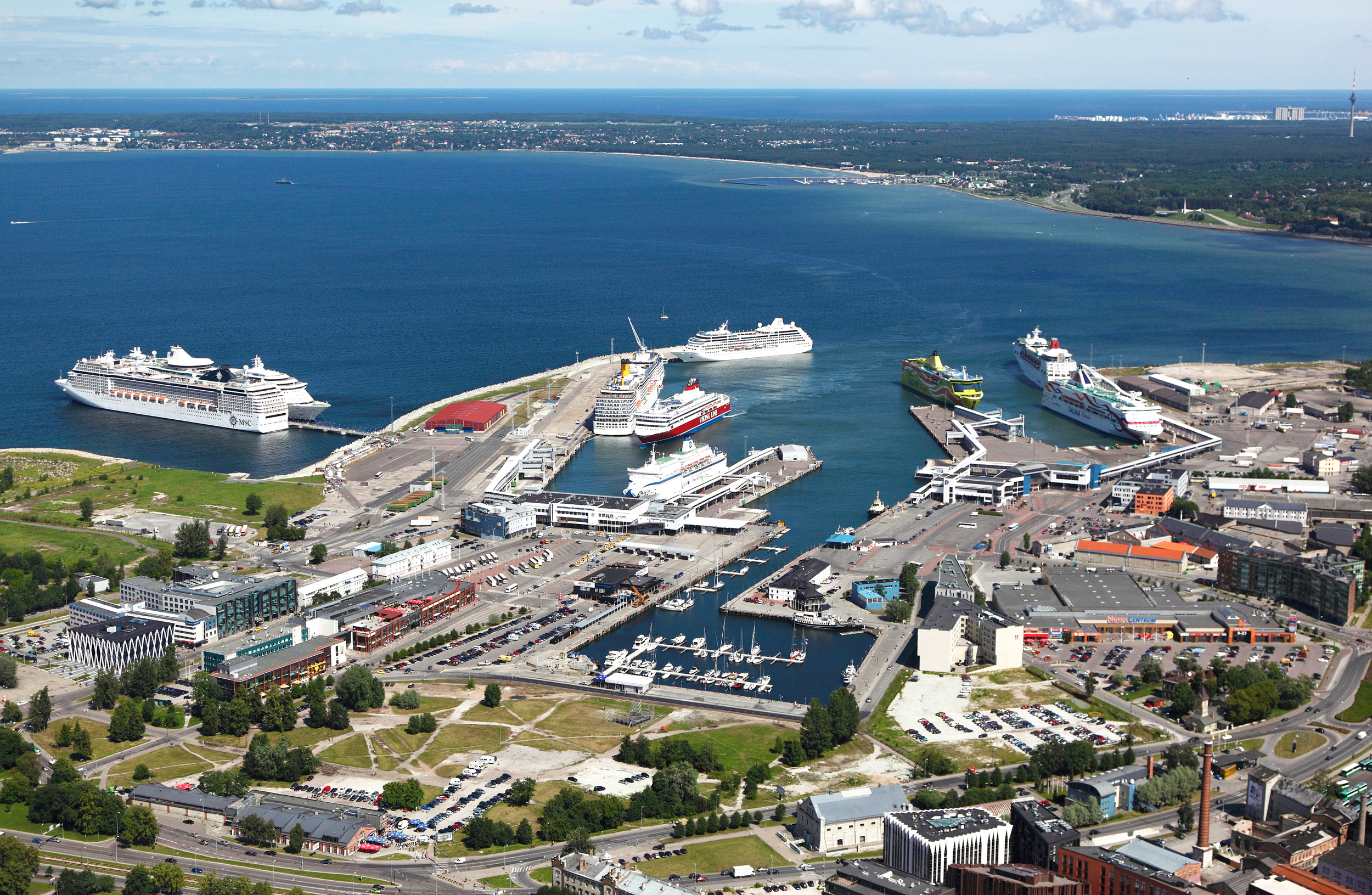
A view of Tallinn's Old City Harbour; Church of St. Simeon's and St. Anne's (dark grey roof) is seen to the right of centre, close to Admiralty Basin – the small-boat marina – and between two carpark areas
