= Soviet annexation of Eastern Galicia and Volhynia =

World War II event

Soviet annexation of Polish lands in 1939 (shown in red), superimposed on a modern map of Ukraine

On the basis of a secret clause of the Molotov–Ribbentrop Pact, the Soviet Union invaded Poland on September 17, 1939, capturing the eastern provinces of the Second Polish Republic. Lwów (present-day Lviv), the capital of the Lwów Voivodeship and the principal city and cultural center of the region of Galicia, was captured and occupied by September 22, 1939 along with other provincial capitals, including Tarnopol, Brześć, Stanisławów, Łuck, and Wilno to the north. The eastern provinces of interwar Poland were inhabited by an ethnically mixed population, with ethnic Poles as well as Polish Jews dominant in the cities, and ethnic Ukrainians dominating the countryside and overall. These lands now form the backbone of modern Western Ukraine and Western Belarus.

The addition of these territories, along with other posterior territorial gains from Romania, resulted in the Ukrainian Soviet Socialist Republic gaining 131,000 square kilometres (50,600 sq mi) in area, and increasing its population by over seven million people from 1938 to 1941. Eastern Galicia and Volhynia were the regions that contributed the most to this. Some other Polish territory also invaded by the Soviet Union was given to Soviet Belarus.

== History ==
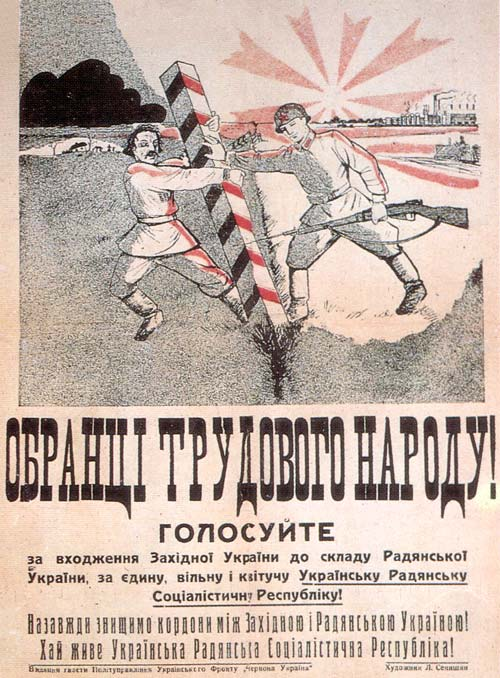
Propaganda poster from the 1939 Soviet invasion of Poland. The Ukrainian text reads: "Let's forever eliminate the border between Western and Soviet Ukraine. Long Live the Ukrainian Soviet Socialist Republic!"

On September 17, 1939 the Red Army entered Polish territory, acting on the basis of a secret clause of the Molotov–Ribbentrop Pact between the Soviet Union and Nazi Germany. The Soviet Union would later deny the existence of this secret protocol, claiming that it was never allied with the German Reich, and acted independently to protect the Ukrainian and White Ruthenian (modern Belarusian) minorities in the disintegrating Polish state. Composed of mostly ethnic Ukrainian Soviet troops under the command of Marshal Semyon Timoshenko, the Soviet forces occupied the eastern areas of Poland within 12 days, capturing the regions of Galicia and Volhynia with little Polish opposition, and occupying the principal city, Lwów, by September 22.

According to Volodymyr Kubiyovych, Soviet troops were greeted with genuine joy by the Ukrainian villagers due to the Polish government's discrimination against the Ukrainian minority in previous years. Not all Ukrainians trusted the Soviet regime, however, mainly due to its role in the Ukrainian Famine of 1932–1933. In practice, the poor generally welcomed the Soviets, while the elites tended to join the opposition, despite supporting the unification of Ukraine.

Immediately after entering Poland's territory, the Soviet army helped to set up "provisional administrations" in the cities and "peasant committees" in the villages in order to organize one-list elections to the new "People's Assembly of Western Ukraine". The elections were designed to give the annexation an appearance of validity, but in practice voters often were only presented with a single candidate, usually a local communist or someone sent to western Ukraine from Soviet Ukraine, for each position of deputy; the Communist Party commissars then provided the assembly with resolutions that would push through nationalization of banks and heavy industry and transfers of land to peasant communities. Elections took place on October 22, 1939; the official numbers reported participation of 93 percent of the electorate, 91 percent of whom supported the appointed candidates. Based on these results, the People's Assembly of Western Ukraine, headed by Kyryl Studynsky (a prominent academic and figure in the Christian Social Movement), consisted of 1,484 deputies. They met in Lwów on October 26–28, where they were addressed by Nikita Khrushchev and other representatives of the Ukrainian Soviet Socialist Republic. The assembly voted unanimously to thank Stalin for liberation and sent a delegation headed by Studynsky to Moscow to ask for formal inclusion of the territories into the Ukrainian SSR. The Supreme Soviet voted to do so on November 1, 1939, and on November 15 a law was passed officially making the former eastern Polish territories a part of the Ukrainian SSR.

== Soviet policies in the newly annexed territories ==
=== Law and order ===
A week after the start of World War II, on 8 September 1939, Lavrentiy Beria issued an order, according to which Narkom of the NKVD in the Ukrainian SSR Ivan Serov had to organize the NKVD operational groups (opergroups). They were tasked among other functions with the clearing of "liberated" regions from the "anti-Soviet elements". Despite that, to assist, the NKVD special groups out of the Kiev Special Military District (from July 1939 to June 1941 Kiev Military District had status "special") were allocated several additional battalions of 300 warriors each, Serov asked Beria to allow him to create new groups and increase staff of "punishers". The First Secretary of the Central Committee of the Communist Party (Bolsheviks) of Ukraine Nikita Khrushchev asked the chief of the Special Department of the Ukrainian Front Anatoliy Mikheyev, a 28 year old major, "What kind of a job is it when no one is executed?"

On 14 December 1939, the Politburo of the Central Committee of the Communist Party (Bolsheviks) of Ukraine adopted a resolution "On the payment of pensions to pensioners of the former Western Ukraine (О выплате пенсий пенсионерам бывшей Западной Украины)" which in the first months in Lviv alone left over 4,300 residents without pensions (those included former police servicemembers, civil officials, judges, "cult servants"). The majority of those pensioners lived the rest of their lives in shelters for the infirm and disabled.

For the Red Army and its servicemembers, law and order in occupied Lviv was a merely a formality. Pogroms, rape, robberies, and unreasonable executions became an everyday occurrence. The military shot prisoners as well as civilians. Looting spread. The unlawful incidents became so big a problem that the 6th Army prosecutor Nechyporenko was forced to write a personal letter to Stalin asking to intervene and stop the atrocities. Special brutality was noted against priests and bishops; in particular, the Chekists (members of Cheka) made bishop Symon walk naked on the streets of Kremenets towards a local prison hitting him with rifle stocks on the way.

=== Government and administration ===
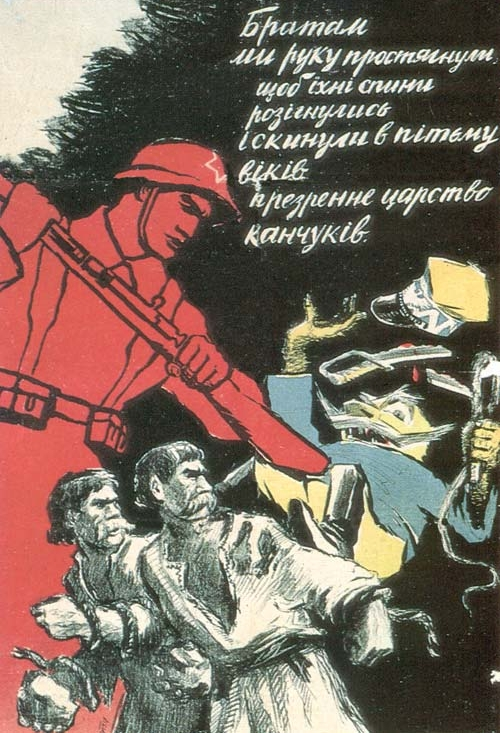
Soviet propaganda poster depicting the 1939 Red Army advance into eastern Poland. Soldier knocking off caricature of a Polish general from the backs of peasants armed with boulders

The lands annexed by the Soviet Union were administratively reorganized into six oblasts similar to those in the rest of the Soviet Union (Drohobych Oblast, Lviv Oblast, Rivne Oblast, Stanislav (later Ivano-Frankivsk) Oblast, Tarnopil Oblast and Volyn Oblast). The civilian administration in those regions annexed from Poland was organized by December 1939 and was drawn mostly from newcomers from eastern Ukraine and Russia; only 20% of government employees were from the local population. It was falsely assumed by many Ukrainians that a disproportionate number of people working for the Soviet administration came from within the Jewish community. The reason for this belief was that most of the previous Polish administrators were deported, and the local Ukrainian intelligentsia who could have taken their place were generally deemed to be too nationalistic for such work by the Soviets. In reality, most positions were staffed by ethnic Ukrainians from the Soviet Union. Nevertheless, in the eyes of many Ukrainians the Jews came to be associated with Soviet rule, which contributed to rising anti-Jewish sentiments. The Polish language was eliminated from public life, and Ukrainian became the language of the government and the courts. All Polish institutions were abolished, and all Polish officials, civil servants, and police were deported to Siberia or Central Asia.

Ukrainian organizations not controlled by the Soviets were limited or abolished. Hundreds of credit unions and cooperatives that had served the Ukrainian people between the wars were shut down. All local Ukrainian political parties were abolished, and between 20,000 and 30,000 Ukrainian activists fled to German-occupied territory; most of those who did not escape were arrested. For example, Dr. Dmytro Levitsky, former head of the moderate Ukrainian political party Ukrainian National Democratic Alliance (UNDO) that had dominated Ukrainian political life between the world wars and chief of the Ukrainian delegation in the pre-war Polish parliament, was arrested alongside many of his colleagues, deported to Moscow, and never heard from again. The elimination of the individuals, organizations and parties that represented moderate or liberal political tendencies left the extremist Organization of Ukrainian Nationalists, which operated in the underground, as the only political party with a significant organizational presence left in western Ukraine.

=== Education and healthcare ===
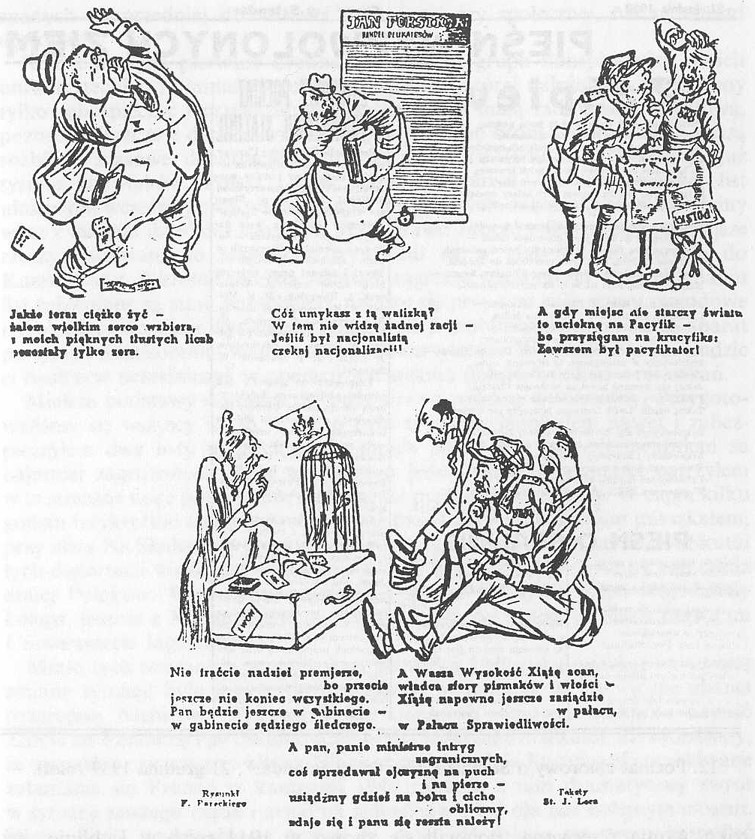
Pro-Soviet caricatures published in Polish in Lviv in September 1940, ridiculing "enemies of the state" – Polish businessmen, army officers and aristocracy.

Due to the sensitive location of western Ukraine along the border with German-held territory, the Soviet administration made attempts, initially, to gain the loyalty and respect of the Ukrainian population. Healthcare, especially in the villages, was improved dramatically. Between the two world wars, Poland had drastically reduced the number of Ukrainian-language schools. Many of these were now reopened and, although Russian became a mandatory foreign-language course, the schools were taught in Ukrainian. Ukrainian was reintroduced in the University of Lviv (where the Polish government had banished it during the interwar years), which became thoroughly Ukrainized and renamed after Ukrainian writer Ivan Franko. The Soviet authorities established a branch of the Ukrainian Academy of Sciences in Lviv, and some leading non-Communist Ukrainian scholars were invited to staff these institutions. University students from Eastern Ukraine were brought to Lviv and western Ukrainian students, professors, and other cultural figures were sent on Soviet-funded trips to Kiev. An unintended result of such exchanges was that the Galician youth were disagreeably surprised by the material poverty and widespread use of Russian in Soviet Ukraine, while the incoming students to western Ukraine became exposed to and sometimes came to adopt the typical form of Ukrainian nationalism dominant in the west. In contrast to the dramatic expansion of educational opportunities within the Soviet system, non-Soviet controlled educational institutions such as the popular Prosvita society reading rooms, the Shevchenko Scientific Society, libraries and community theaters, and the Russophile Stauropegion Institute were closed or abolished.

=== Land reform ===
In the annexed territories, over 50 percent of the land had belonged to Polish landlords while approximately 75% of the Ukrainian peasants owned less than two hectares of land per household. Starting in 1939, lands not owned by the peasants were seized and slightly less than half of them were distributed to landless peasants free of charge; the rest were given to new collective farms. The Soviet authorities then began taking land from the peasants themselves and turning it over to collective farms, which affected 13% of western Ukrainian farmland by 1941. This caused the peasants to turn against the Soviet regime.

=== Religious persecution ===
Metropolitan Andrey Sheptytsky, head of the Ukrainian Greek Catholic Church

At the time of the Soviet annexation of Eastern Galicia and Volhynia, the Ukrainian Greek Catholic Church had approximately 2,190 parishes, three theological seminaries, 29 monasteries, 120 convents and 3.5 million faithful. Its leader, Andrey Sheptytsky, was seen as a "father figure" by most western Ukrainians. The married Western Ukrainian Clergy and their children formed a caste that had a high degree of influence within Ukrainian society. Using his moral influence, Sheptytsky persuaded all but approximately 100 of the Ukrainian Catholic priests in western Ukrainian to stay with their flock in western Ukraine rather than flee from the Soviet regime. Due to its immense popularity, as well as that of Sheptytsky, among the western Ukrainian people, the Soviet Union did not attempt to abolish the Ukrainian Greek Catholic Church nor persecute its leader at that time. Instead, it sought to limit the Church's influence by banishing its presence from schools, preventing it from printing (20 Ukrainian Catholic journals or newspapers were shut down), confiscating lands from which it derived income, closing monasteries and seminaries, levying high taxes, and introducing anti-religious propaganda into schools and the media. The Soviets also attempted to undermine the Church from within. A prominent Lviv priest and close confidante of Andrey Sheptytsky, Havriil Kostelnyk, who had been the principal critic of the Vatican's Latinization policies and spokesperson for the "Easternizing" trend within the Ukrainian Catholic Church, was asked to organize a "National" Greek Catholic Church, with Soviet support, that would be independent of the Vatican and which would split the faithful in western Ukraine. At this time, he refused to cooperate, even after the autumn of 1940 when the Soviets arrested his youngest son in order to blackmail him. After Sheptytksy's death, however, Kostelnyk would play a significant role in the destruction of the Ukrainian Greek Catholic Church. Arrests, though not of a mass nature, were used in order to terrify the religious leaders. For example, in June 1940, the superior of the Studite convent in Lviv, Olena Viter, was imprisoned and tortured in order to "confess" that Sheptytsky was a member of the Organization of Ukrainian Nationalists and that she was supplying him with weapons. She refused to do so. By the summer of 1941, in Western Ukraine, 11 or 12 Greek Catholic priests were murdered or went missing, and fifty-three were imprisoned or deported.

Despite the various restrictions, the Ukrainian Greek Catholic Church was left as the only remaining independent Ukrainian institution that operated openly in Ukrainian territory. Church attendance soared, and contemporary accounts described churches never having been as full as they became under Soviet rule, with long lines forming in front of confessional booths. The western Ukrainian people attempted to protect their Church from Soviet restrictions. Peasants, even among the poorest ones, were reluctant to accept land taken from the Church and offered to them, and as late as in May 1940, some villages had not yet expropriated church lands, while others distributed much of it to priests' families. Priests made homeless were taken in by parishioners. Children, who no longer learned religion in school, started obtaining religious instruction privately.

The Ukrainian Autocephalous Orthodox Church in Volhynia faced similar restrictions to those of the Ukrainian Greek Catholic Church; moreover it underwent pressure to subordinate itself to the Moscow Patriarch. Many Orthodox priests fled the Soviet regime, resulting in a large number of newly consecrated priests who were not necessarily fit for their duties, weakening and demoralizing the Church somewhat. The Orthodox hierarchs in western Ukraine were left alone, however.

=== Deportations and demographic changes ===
Initially, the Soviet authorities deported primarily political figures as well as all Polish officials, civil servants, police, and Polish citizens who had fled from the Germans. The exact number of Poles deported to Siberia or Central Asia between 1939 and 1941 remains unknown, and has been estimated at from under 500,000 to over 1,500,000. Additionally, tens of thousands of German-speaking people from Volhynia were also moved to German-controlled territory.

In April 1940 the Soviet authorities in the annexed territories began to extend their repressive measures towards the general Ukrainian population. This coincided with the removal of Soviet troops of ethnic Ukrainian origin, who had become too friendly with local Ukrainians, and their replacement by soldiers from Central Asia. The Soviet authorities began arresting and deporting anyone suspected of disloyalty to the Soviet regime. In villages, people were denounced by their neighbors, some of whom were Communist sympathizers while others were opportunists. Deportations became indiscriminate, and people and their families were deported for "crimes" such as having relatives or visiting abroad, or visiting friends while the friends were arrested. Because many of those making denunciations were perceived to be Jews, anti-Jewish sentiments among the Ukrainian population increased. Ultimately, between 1939 and the beginning of Operation Barbarossa approximately 500,000 Ukrainians would be deported to Siberia and central Asia. 100,000 Jews fleeing Nazi terror in German-occupied Poland arrived in the territories newly annexed by the USSR.

== Aftermath ==
Following the Soviet annexation of Eastern Galicia and Volhynia, the Ukrainian SSR would gain more land following the Soviet occupation of Bessarabia and Northern Bukovina. Due to it, Ukraine gained Northern Bukovina, Northern Bessarabia, Budjak (Southern Bessarabia) and the Hertsa region from Romania. However, the Moldavian Autonomous Soviet Socialist Republic (Moldavian ASSR) within Ukraine was abolished and half of it (Transnistria) was given to the newly created Moldavian Soviet Socialist Republic (Moldavian SSR), which emerged from the rest of Bessarabia.

On June 22, 1941 Operation Barbarossa began, and western Ukraine was captured within weeks. Prior to retreating, the Soviet authorities, unwilling to evacuate prisoners, chose to kill all inmates whether or not they had committed major or minor crimes and whether or not they were held for political reasons. Estimates of the number of people killed vary from 15,000 to 40,000. Due to the brutality of the Soviet administration, many Ukrainians initially welcomed the German invasion. On June 30, 1941, Ukrainian nationalist commandos under German command captured Lviv which had been evacuated by Soviet forces and declared an independent state allied with Nazi Germany. This movement was quashed by the Germans, who split up western Ukraine. Galicia, which had once been part of Austria, was made part of the General Government together with occupied Poland, while Volhynia was split off and attached to the Reichskommissariat Ukraine. Romania also regained its former lands and expanded further into Ukrainian territory, including the important city of Odessa, through the formation of the Transnistria Governorate, not formally annexed by Romania but administrated by it. All of these regions would be captured and reintegrated into Soviet Ukraine in 1944.

The Ukrainian SSR's borders would change during the rest of World War II and shortly after it. It was given Carpathian Ruthenia from Czechoslovakia and some Danubian islands and the Snake Island in the Black Sea from Romania but lost Zakerzonia to Soviet-occupied Poland. The same thing would happen with the Belastok Region of Soviet Belarus. The 1954 transfer of Crimea from the Russian SFSR to the Ukrainian SSR would ultimately consolidate the legally and internationally recognized borders of Ukraine as they are today.

== Importance for the Ukrainian and Belarusian statehood ==
The Soviet annexation of some 51.6% of the territory of the Second Polish Republic, where about 13,200,000 people lived in 1939 including Poles and Jews, was an important event in the history of contemporary Ukraine and Belarus, because it brought within Ukrainian and Belarusian SSR new territories inhabited in part by ethnic Ukrainian and Belarusian people, and thus unified previously separated branches of these nations. The postwar population transfers imposed by Joseph Stalin, and the mass killings of the Holocaust, solidified the mono-ethnic character of these lands by nearly a complete eradication of the Polish and Jewish presence there. Ukraine and Belarus achieved independence in 1991 after the fall of the Soviet Union and became sovereign nation states delineated by 50-year-old borders of the former republics. "The process of amalgamation", wrote Orest Subtelny, a Canadian historian of Ukrainian descent, "was not only a major aspect of the post-war period, but an event of epochal significance in the history of Ukraine."

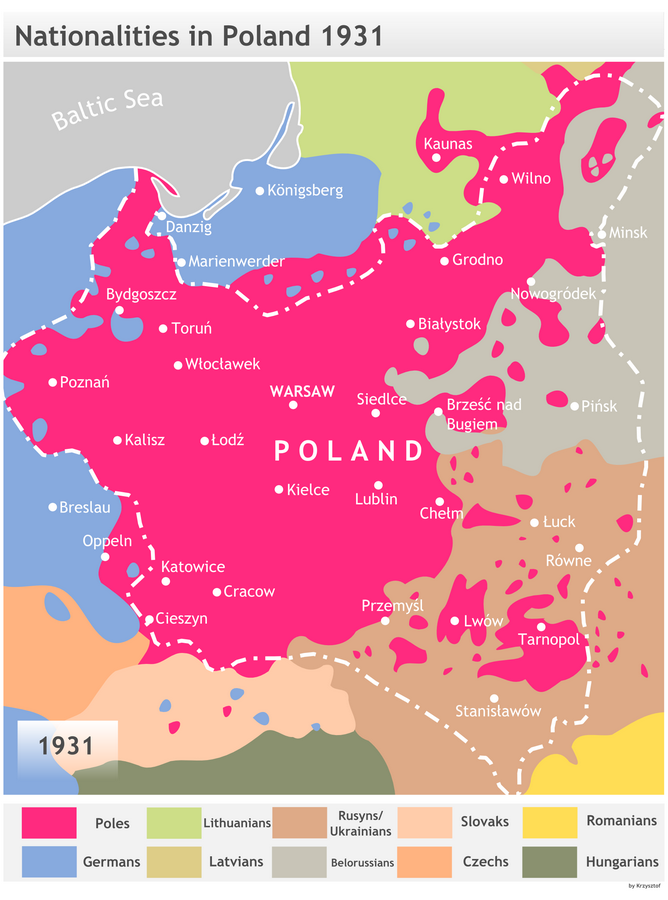
Nationalities in Second Polish Republic ca. 1931

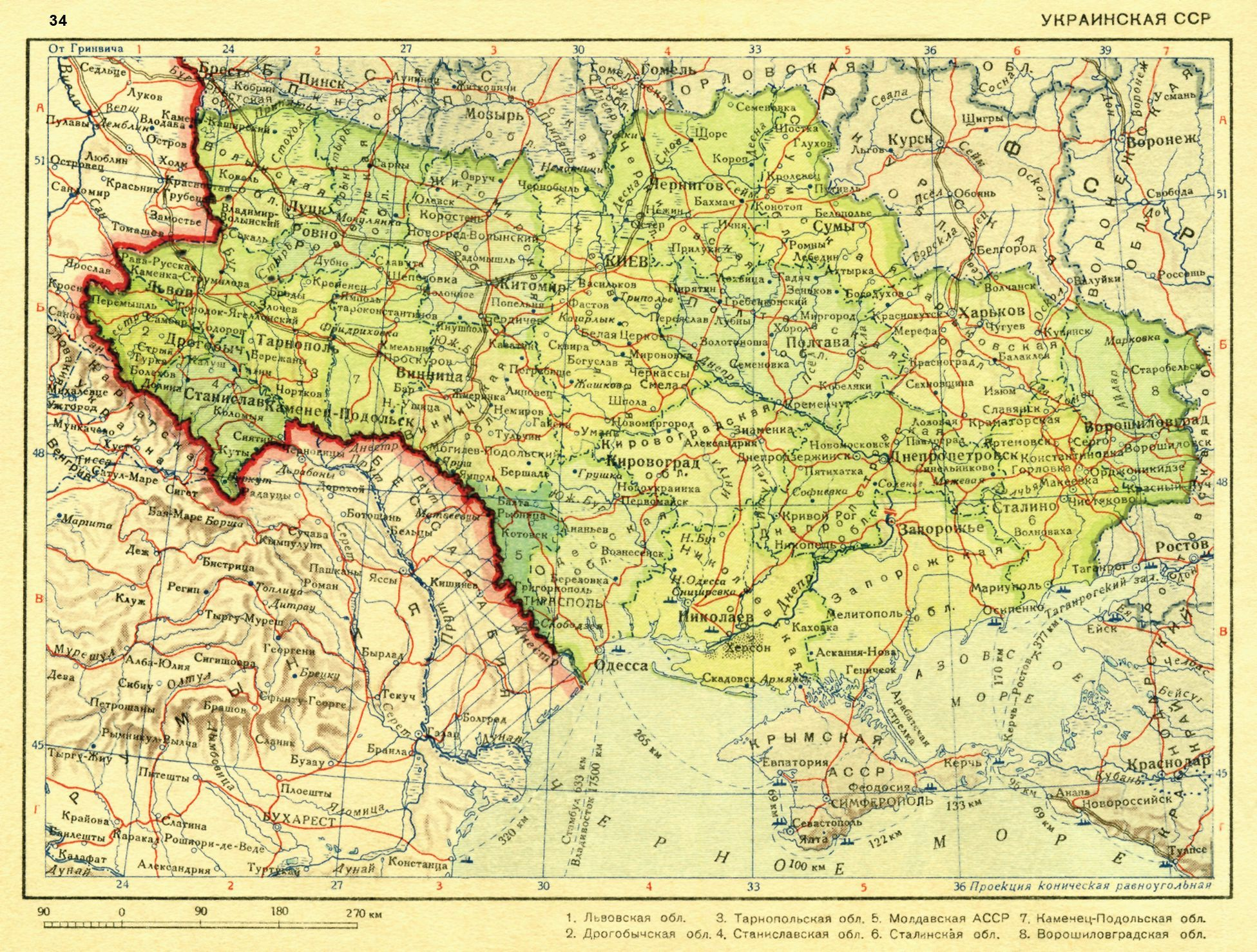
Ukrainian SSR in 1939 after the Soviet annexation of Eastern Galicia and Volhynia. Bessarabia, then part of Romania, is shaded as it was claimed by Ukraine's Moldavian Autonomous Soviet Socialist Republic.

== See also ==
- Russian occupation of Eastern Galicia, 1914–1915
