= Narodovtsi =

19th-century Ukrainian political movement

Narodovtsi (Ukrainian: Народовці; Ukrainian pronunciation: [nɐroˈdɔu̯t͡sʲi], literally translated as "populists"), also known in historiography as Western Ukrainian Populists was a cultural and political movement of Ukrainian intelligentsia, which emerged during the early 1860s in Austrian Galicia as a reaction to the growth of Moscophile sympathies among the conservative camp of the national movement. The Narodovtsi movement was based on the idea of national autonomy and unity with ethnic Ukrainians living in the Russian Empire, as well as promotion of literature and schooling in the Ukrainian vernacular. In contrast to representatives of the older conservative generation, which had been dominated by higher priesthood and state bureaucrats, followers of the Narodovtsi movement were mostly students, minor clergymen and secular intellectuals. Unlike their Russophile rivals, they enjoyed no support from foreign governments, which contributed to a more democratic character of the movement. Narodovtsi played a major role in the development of Ukrainian press, as well as in the nation's scientific and public life, with members of the movement being among the founders of Prosvita, Shevchenko Scientific Society and Dilo newspaper.

== History ==
=== Emergence and early activities ===
The movement of Narodovtsi emerged under the influence of Ukrainian national democratic traditions embodied by the Brotherhood of Saints Cyril and Methodius, Ruthenian Triad and the Supreme Ruthenian Council, which existed during the 1830s and 1840s and literary works of whose activists and followers, such as Taras Shevchenko, Markiyan Shashkevych, Panteleimon Kulish, Mykola Kostomarov, Marko Vovchok and Yuriy Fedkovych, produced a major effect on the movement's members. Narodovtsi were also significantly influenced by the ideas of the Khlopomany movement. Their first activities were concentrated around the publication of magazines and establishment of ties with the Hromada movement in Dnieper Ukraine, which inspired the creation of similar communities by students in Berezhany, Stanislaviv, Sambir and Ternopil. Among notable early members of the Narodovtsi movement were Stepan Kachala, Kornylo Ustiyanovych and Sydir Vorobkevych.

Following the bans on Ukrainian publications in the Russian Empire, a number of Ukrainian authors moved their publishing activities to Galicia, which had a beneficial effect on the literary and scientific spheres in the region. Benefitting from the new Austrian constitution, Narodovtsi activists established a number of societies, including the first Ukrainian stationary theatre in 1864, the Prosvita educational society in 1868, and the Shevchenko Scientific Society in 1873. These institutions contributed to the spread of education and national ideas among the popular masses. A major influence on the movement was made by the publications of Mykhailo Drahomanov. At the same time, the majority of Narodovtsi rejected Drahomanov's socialist and anticlerical views. Their initial concentration on the cultural sphere precluded them from addressing social issues and engaging in political affairs.

=== Entry into politics and split ===
Following the defeat of Ruthenian representatives during the 1879 elections to the Imperial Council, Narodovtsi finally emerged as a political force, establishing their own newspapers Batkivshchyna ("Fatherland") and Dilo ("Deed"). Notable activists of the movement during that time included Oleksander Barvinsky and Anatole Vakhnianyn. In 1885 Narodovtsi broke up their relations with the Russophile camp and organized their own political organization - Narodna Rada ("People's Council"). During that period, the movement became less radical, gradually adopting conservative, loyalist and clerical positions. This resulted in the emergence of a new radical current among Narodovtsi, which followed the philosophy of Drahomanov and was represented, among others, by Ivan Franko and future members of the National Democratic Party.

The failure of the "New Era" agreement with Polish ruling elites of Galicia in 1894 led to the split of Narodovtsi movement into several political parties: Ruthenian-Ukrainian Radical Party, Ukrainian National Democratic Party, Ukrainian Social Democratic Party and the Christian Social Party. In Bukovina and Transcarpathia the Narodovtsi movement preserved its unity for a longer time, inspiring the national cultural revival and influencing the political views of local politicians, most notably Avgustyn Voloshyn.

== See also ==
- National Democracy (Ukraine)

== Sources ==
- Encyclopedia of Ukraine
- Subtelny, Orest (2009). Ukraine: A History, Fourth Edition. University of Toronto Press. ISBN 978-1-4426-9728-7.
