= Omelan Pleszkewycz =

Ukrainian activist (1908–2007)

- Омелян Плешкевич
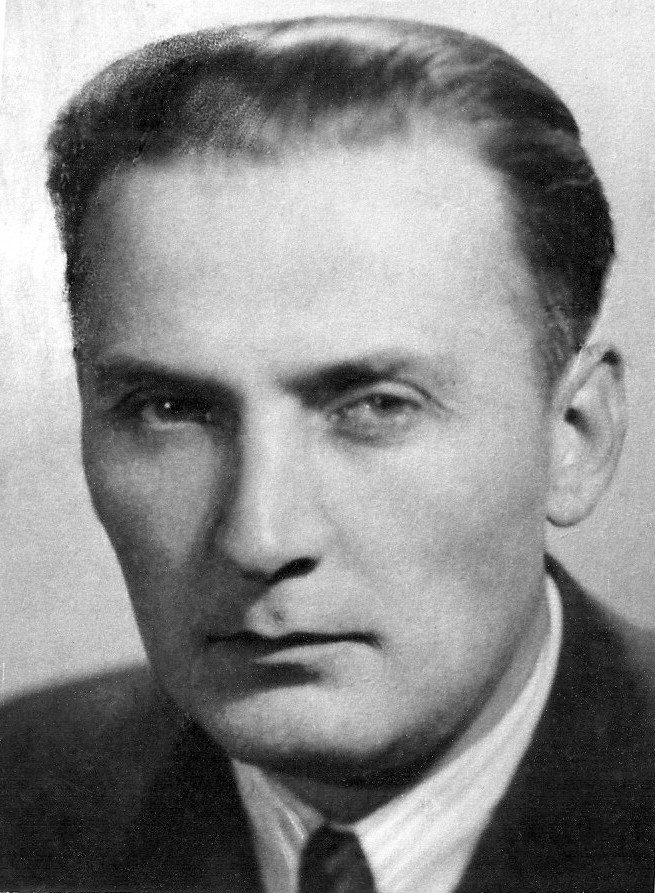
- Born: January 20, 1908; Boratyn, Austria-Hungary (now Ukraine)
- Died: May 30, 2007 (aged 99); Chicago, Illinois
- Occupation: Community leader

Emil Omelan Pleszkewycz (Note: Ukrainian: Омелян Іванович Плешкевич, romanized: Omelian Ivanovych Pleshkevych) (January 20, 1908 – May 30, 2007, also spelled Pleshkewych and Pleshkevich) was a Ukrainian-American community leader and major figure in the Ukrainian cooperative movement, who co-founded the Selfreliance Ukrainian American Credit Union in Chicago and who served as president of the World Council of Ukrainian Credit Unions from 1977 to 1987.

== Biography ==
=== Background ===
Omelan Pleszkewycz was born in 1908 in Boratyn near Sokal in Austria-Hungary. After World War I this area became part of Poland. The Pleszkewycz family in western Ukraine are descended from an officer in Ivan Mazepa's army who escaped into what is now western Ukraine following the defeat of Ivan Mazepa at the Battle of Poltava in 1709. Omelan Pleszkewycz's father, Iwan Pleszkewycz, and grandfather Petro Pleszkewycz were Ukrainian Catholic priests. His grandfather's uncle, Symon Pleszkewycz, was a close friend of Markiyan Shashkevych (initiator of the revival of the Ukrainian language in western Ukraine) and was the first priest to ever give a sermon in the Ukrainian language in St. George's Cathedral, the mother church of the Ukrainian Greek Catholic Church ( Eastern Rite Catholic). Omelan's grandmother, Antonina Vakhnianyna, was the sister of Anatole Vakhnianyn, founder of Prosvita. Omelan was also a nephew of Kazimierz Świtalski, Prime Minister of Poland (1929).

Omelan Pleszkewycz's father was arrested by the Austrian authorities during World War I on suspicion of Russian sympathies and during the Polish–Ukrainian War by the Polish authorities in May 1919, when he was imprisoned for several months in Lviv's infamous Brygidki prison. In addition to serving as a parish priest, in the 1920s Omelan Pleszkewycz's father was an active community organizer, founding a cooperative credit union, a Prosvita reading room to foster literacy among the people, a Ukrainian language children's school, and other Ukrainian organizations in his town.

=== Activities in Europe ===
Omelan Pleszkewycz graduated from a gymnasium in Sokal in 1927 and in 1931 completed a degree in higher economics at Lviv. He then worked for Maslosojuz, a large dairy cooperative, in Stryi. In 1934 he passed examinations in Warsaw as an auditor and received a mandate by the Polish government to serve as a comptroller of large financial institutions and trade institutions in Polish-controlled western Ukraine. At this time he also served as comptroller for dairy cooperatives.

During the German occupation, from 1941 to 1944 he served the Ukrainian cooperatives and credit unions in the Ternopil region as a comptroller.

Omelan Pleszkewycz spoke Ukrainian, English, German, Polish and Russian. After World War II he fled Ukraine to Austria, and lived in Vienna from 1945 until 1946. While there, he studied at the Vienna University of Economics and Business in foreign trade. In 1946 he moved to Germany, where he served as the director of a refugee camp outside of Munich for displaced persons run by the United Nations. While doing so he founded a credit union/cooperative there.

=== Activities in America ===
In 1949 Omelan Pleszkewycz emigrated from Germany to America, where he initially worked as a laborer for Ryerson Steel in Chicago.

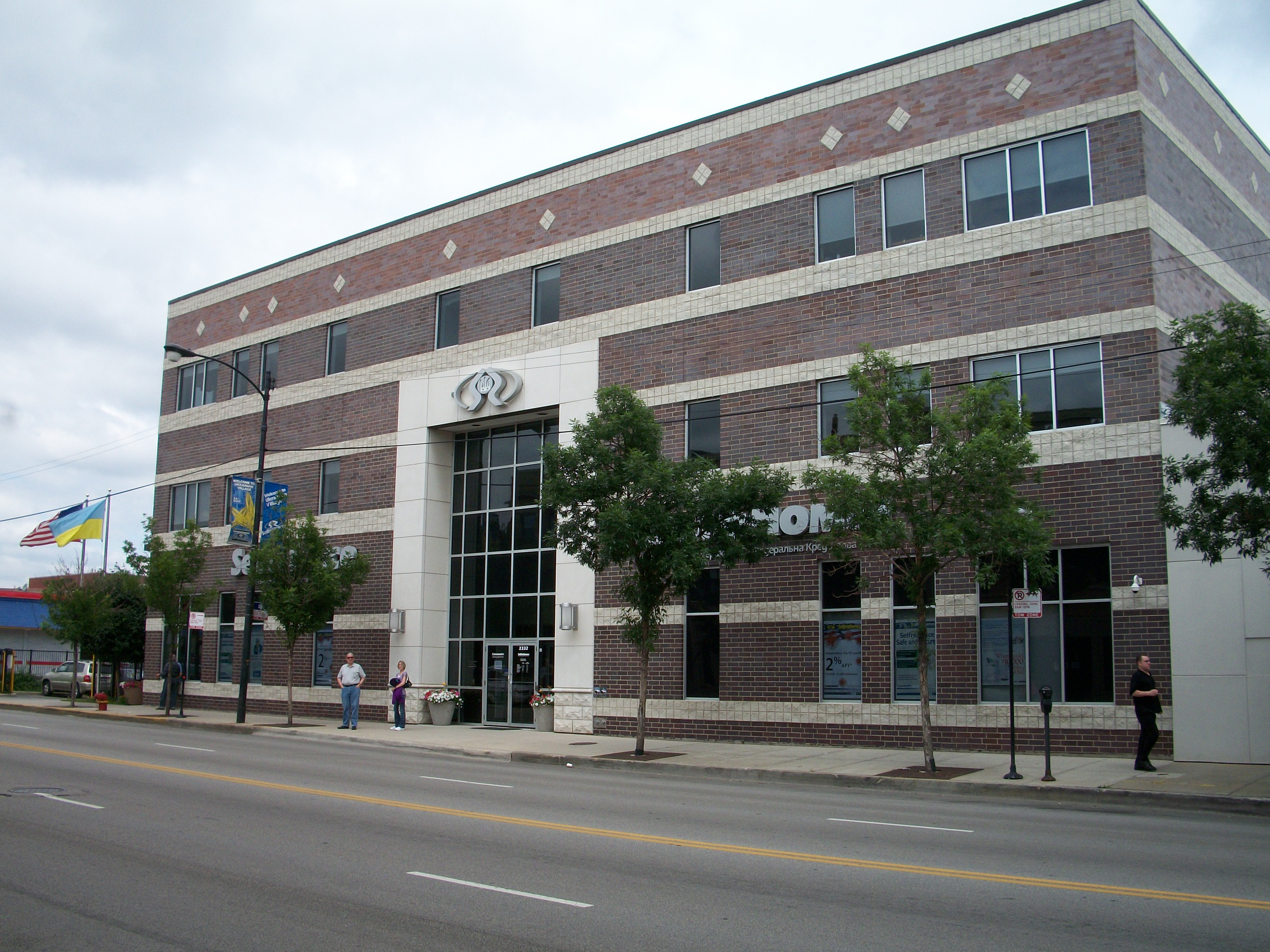
Selfreliance Ukrainian American Credit Union main branch, on Chicago Avenue in Ukrainian Village, Chicago

Omelan Pleszkewycz co-founded the Selfreliance Ukrainian American Credit Union in 1951, using approximately $500 in assets pooled by other Ukrainian refugees, with the goal of providing financial services to people who did not know the languages, laws or local customs and who would have had difficulty obtaining loans from outside the Ukrainian community. For the first two years the credit union operated out of a desk at a local Ukrainian community center, and its founders worked on a voluntary basis. Omelan Pleszkewycz was responsible for overseeing the credit union's daily operations and for keeping complete and accurate records. He became its first salaried employee in 1953. He served as the treasurer and chief executive officer of this credit union from 1951 until his retirement in 1978. In providing mortgages to over 1200 Ukrainians families buying homes and to dozens of Ukrainian businesses in the 1950s and 1960s, the Selfreliance Ukrainian American Credit Union played a significant role in preserving the Ukrainian identity of the Ukrainian Village neighborhood in Chicago. In 1969, Omelan Pleszkewycz became head of the Cooperative division within the Ukrainian World Congress. Pleszkewycz was honored as "Ukrainian Man of the Year" in 1974. After his retirement from the posts of treasurer and chief executive officer of the Selfreliance Ukrainian American Credit Union in 1978, he remained on the staff as honorary president and consultant and continued working at the credit union five days per week until 2004, when he was 96 years old. This credit union grew to become the seventh largest in the state of Illinois with assets of over $450 million at the time of his death.

From 1977 until 1987 Omelan Pleszkewycz was president of the World Council of Ukrainian Credit Unions, an umbrella organization of Ukrainian credit unions in the United States, Canada and Australia. In 1988 these credit unions collectively held 1.267 billion dollars in assets.

Omelan Pleszkewycz married Emilia (Romanowska) in 1937. At the time of his death he had two children, Alexander and Bohdan, six grandchildren and four great-grandchildren.

== Honors ==
In 2000, he was inducted into the Illinois Credit Union Hall of Fame.

He was named honorary treasurer of Cook County, Illinois by Cook County Treasurer Maria Pappas in 2003.
