= Eastern Catholic clergy in Ukraine =

Priestly hereditary dynasty

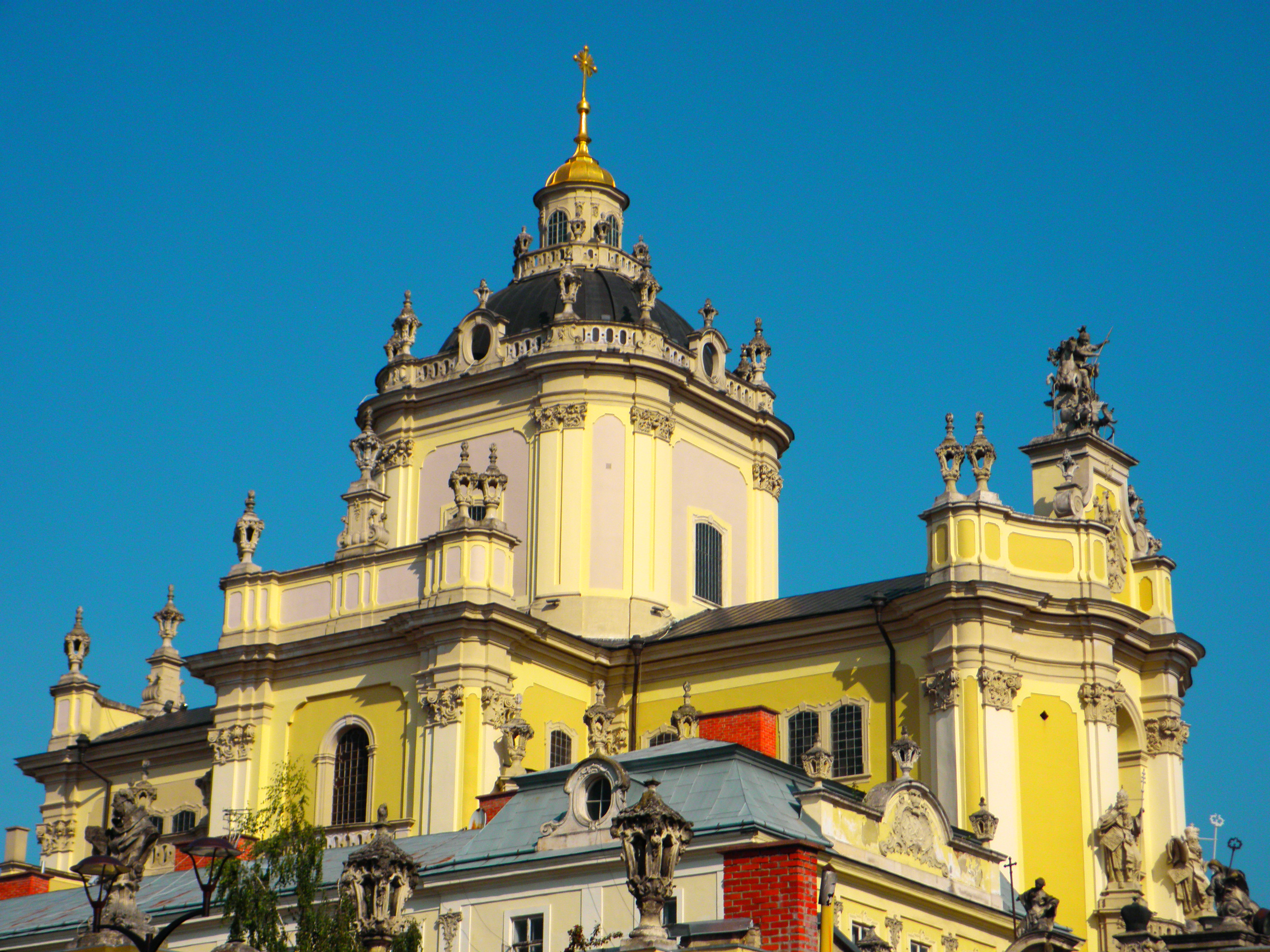
St. George's Cathedral, Lviv: The cathedral also holds a predominant position in Ukrainian religious and cultural terms.

The Eastern Catholic clergy of the Ukrainian Greek Catholic Church formed a tight-knit hereditary social caste that dominated Ukrainian society in Western Ukraine, from the late eighteenth until the mid-twentieth centuries, following reforms instituted by Emperor Joseph II, Sovereign of the Kingdom of Galicia and Lodomeria. Because, like their Eastern Orthodox brethren, married men in the Ukrainian Catholic Church could become priests (although they could not become Bishops unless they were widowers), they were able to establish "priestly dynasties", often associated with specific regions, for many generations. Numbering approximately 2,000-2,500 by the 19th century, priestly families tended to marry within their group, constituting a tight-knit hereditary caste. In the absence of a significant culturally and politically active native nobility (although there was considerable overlap, with more than half of the clerical families also being of petty noble origin), and enjoying a virtual monopoly on education and wealth within western Ukrainian society, the clergy came to form that group's native aristocracy. The clergy adopted Austria's role for them as bringers of culture and education to the Ukrainian countryside. Most Ukrainian social and political movements in Austrian-controlled territory emerged or were highly influenced by the clergy themselves or by their children. This influence was so great that western Ukrainians were accused by their Polish rivals of wanting to create a theocracy in western Ukraine. The central role played by the Ukrainian clergy or their children in western Ukrainian society would weaken somewhat at the end of the nineteenth century but would continue until the Soviet Union forcibly dissolved the Ukrainian Greek Catholic Church in Ukrainian territories in the mid-twentieth century (in the so-called Council of Lviv in 1946).

== Background and origins ==
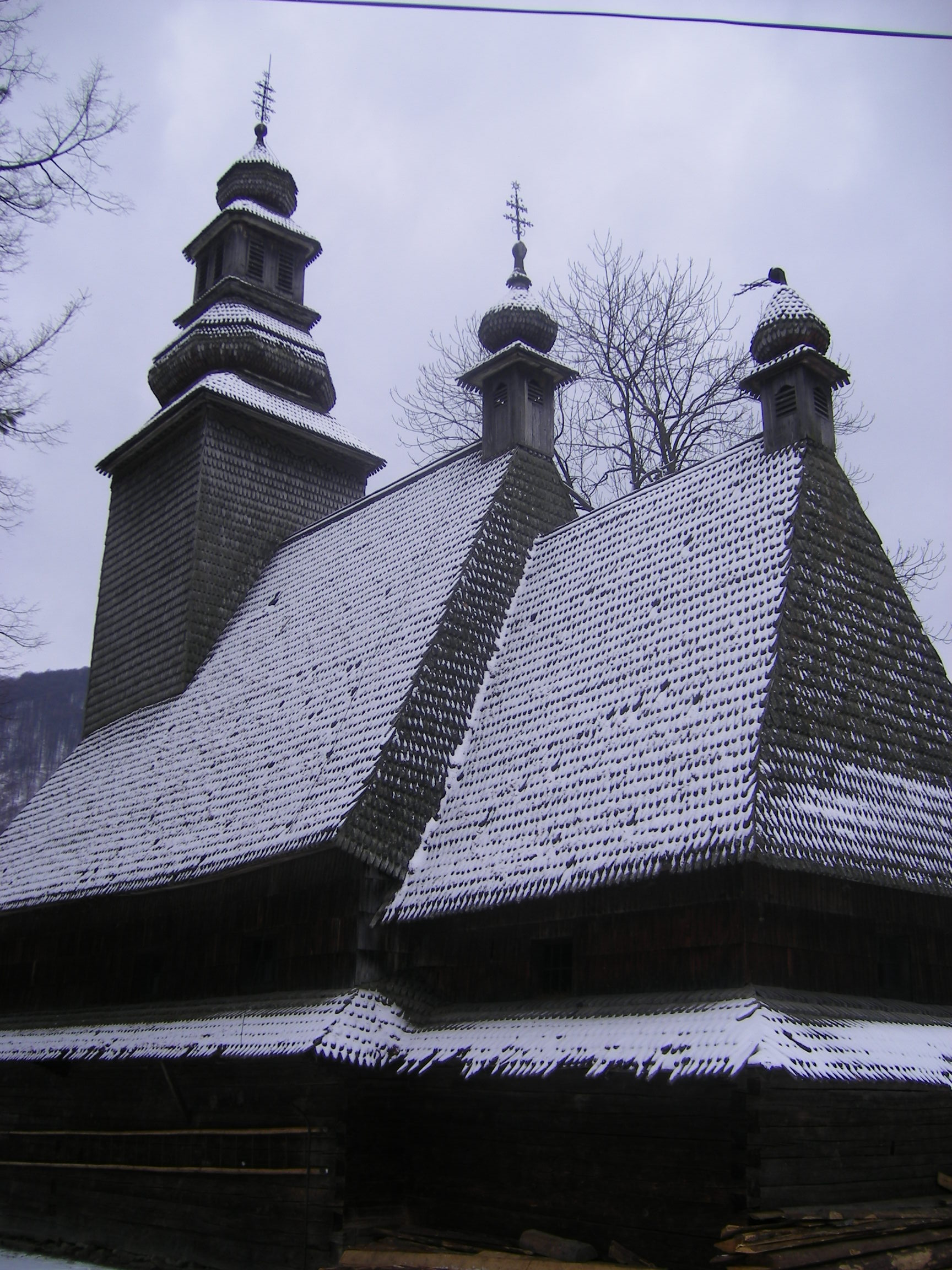
Traditional wooden Ukrainian Catholic Church in Kolochava

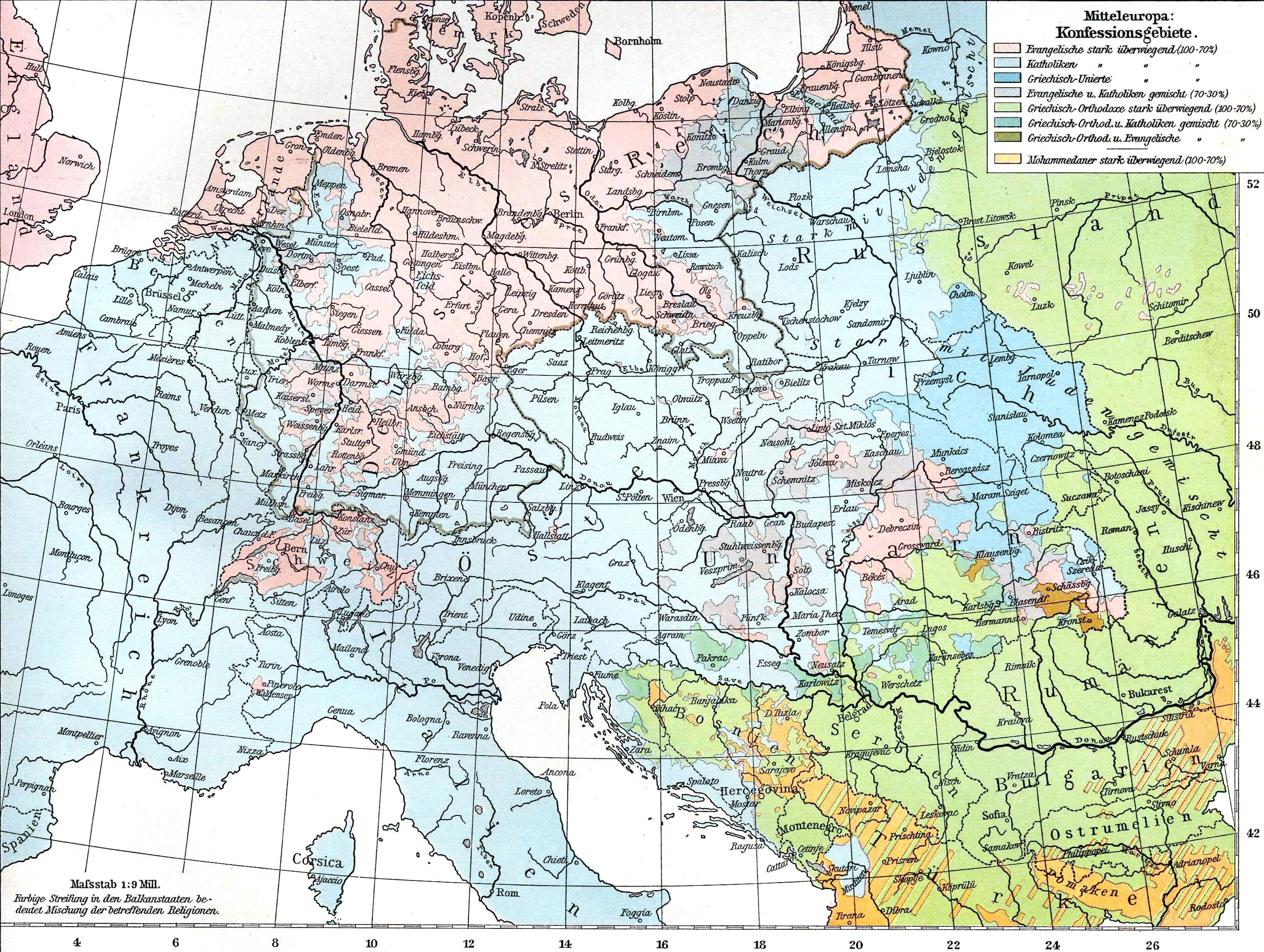
East Catholic regions in Europe (1901) including the Romanian Greek Catholic Church

In 988, the East Slavic state of Kyivan Rus' was converted to the Eastern form of Christianity at the behest of Volodymyr I of Kyiv. After the East-West Schism between the Roman and Byzantine Churches, the form of Christianity that Kyivan Rus' followed became known (in English) as the Eastern Orthodox Church. The westernmost part of Kyivan Rus' formed the independent Kingdom of Galicia–Volhynia, which Poland conquered in 1349. Over the following centuries, most of the native landowning nobility adopted the dominant Polish nationality and Roman Catholic religion. Only the poorer nobles, who were descended from a mixture of poor boyar families, druzhina (free warriors serving the princes) and free peasants, retained their East Slavic identity. Many priestly families had origins among those poor nobles. and in some particular regions, such as the area between Lviv and the Carpathian Mountains, almost all of the priestly families were of poor noble origins. Such people identified themselves primarily as priests, rather than nobles. Thus, the local native society was composed principally of priests and peasants. In an attempt to limit Polish pressure, the Union of Brest (1595/1596) saw the creation of the Uniate Church (later the Ukrainian Greek Catholic Church) in the former parts of Kyivan Rus' under Polish rule. Like other Eastern Catholic Churches, the Uniate Church maintained the liturgical, theological and devotional traditions such as a married priesthood of the Orthodox Church despite its new allegiance to Rome.

== History ==
The centuries of Polish rule were characterized by a steady erosion of the economic and social status of most of the local Galician clergy. Prior to the Habsburg reforms, a very small number of Greek Catholic clergy, often Polonized nobility, were linked to the Basilian order. The Order was independent of the Greek Catholic hierarchy and continued to enjoy certain wealth and privileges which it did not share with the rest of the Church. In striking contrast, the Galician priests who were not of noble origin, although not serfs, were frequently forced to work for the Polish nobles and treated little better than peasants by them, and these priests' sons who did not follow their fathers' vocation were often placed under the same feudal obligations as were hereditary serfs. Such circumstances fostered a sense of solidarity and closeness between the priests and the peasants. There were cases of Ukrainian priests or their sons participating in or leading armed insurrections against Polish nobility. The situation changed when the region of Galicia was annexed by Austria in 1772.

Travelling the lands newly acquired from Poland in 1772, Austrian emperor Joseph II decided that the Greek Catholic clergy would be ideal vehicles for bringing about enlightened reform among the Ukrainian population. With this in mind he undertook major reforms designed to increase the status and educational level of the Ukrainian clergy in order to enable them to play the role he assigned for them. The Greek Catholic Church and its clergy was raised in status in order to make it legally equal in all respects to its Roman Catholic counterpart. The previously independent Basilian Order was subordinated to the Greek Catholic hierarchy. Ukrainian Catholic priests were granted stipends by the Austrian government, liberating them economically from the Polish nobles who were now prevented by the Austrians from interfering with them. Ukrainian priests were also allotted larger tracts of land that further contributed to an improvement in their financial situation. Whereas previously the Ukrainian priests had typically been taught by their fathers, the Austrians opened seminaries specifically for Ukrainian Catholic students in Vienna (1774) and Lviv (1783) that provided subsequent generations of priests with University-level education and a strong exposure to Western culture. The sons of priests who served in the bishop's administration were given the same rights to state offices as had the sons of nobles. As a result of the Austrian reforms of the late 18th century, the Ukrainian Catholic priests thus became the first large educated social class within the Ukrainian population in Galicia.

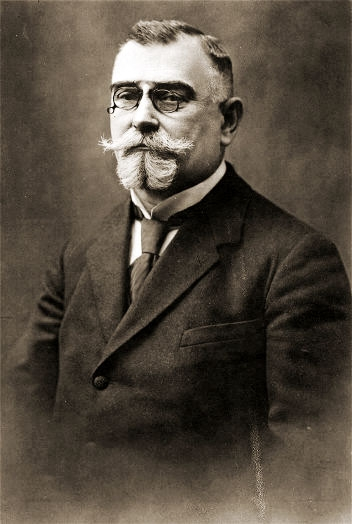
Kost Levytsky, a priest's son, would become the major political figure in western Ukraine in the late 19th and early 20th centuries

The Austrian reforms granting education, land, and government salaries set the stage for the clergy's dominant position in western Ukrainian society for several generations. Both significant Ukrainian social movements, that of the Russophiles who sought to unite Ukraine with Russia and of the Ukrainianophiles, who supported Ukrainian independence, were dominated by members of the clergy. The Supreme Ruthenian Council which represented the Ukrainian people in dealing with the Austrian authorities, consisted primarily of clergy and met in the consistory of St. George's Cathedral, the "mother church" of the Ukrainian Catholic Church. The first non-clerical secular intelligentsia to emerge among western Ukrainians (lawyers, writers, doctors) were typically the children of priests, which served to perpetuate clerical influence among western Ukrainians. Because priests served as the only conduit between the cities and the peasants of the villages, urban Ukrainian intellectuals seeking to reach the peasants were forced by circumstances to work through the priests. They thus tended to be deferential to them and sought to avoid antagonizing the clergy.

The situation changed somewhat by the late nineteenth century. The clergy's colossal efforts to educate the peasants resulted in the relative loss of priestly power. New members of the intelligentsia arose from the peasantry, some of whom objected to what they considered to be the priestly patronizing attitudes towards peasants as childlike or drunkards needing to be taught and led. Simultaneously, urban intellectuals no longer had to go through priests in order to spread their ideas among a newly literate peasantry. The Radical movement appeared in Western Ukraine in the 1870s. Its political party, founded in 1890, was explicitly anti-clerical and sought to limit the clergy's influence. The Radicals helped to spread discontent against the status quo by criticizing sacramental fees that were considered to be too high for the poor peasants, publicizing disputes over land rights between the Church and the peasantry, and attacking priests' authority on moral matters. Often having to wait until the priests had taught the peasants how to read, the Radicals took over many of the reading clubs that the priests had founded and turned them into sources of anti-clerical agitation. In the words of one church leader speaking about reading clubs, "instead of national love they have awakened in our peasant self-love and arrogance." The Radicals' anti-clerical efforts helped to curb the clergy's power. For example, father M. Sichynsy, who had been elected to the Galician Diet in 1883, lost an election to the Reichsrat in 1889 to a Polish candidate, count Borkowski in part because of conflicts between the priest and local peasants over land usage. While the clergy dominated the ethnic Ukrainian parliamentary delegations in the 1860s and 1870s, of the 28 Ukrainian members of Austria's parliament in 1909-1911 only four were clerics. Despite such changes, the largest and most popular western Ukrainian political party from the late nineteenth until through the mid twentieth century continued to be the Ukrainian National Democratic Party, founded and led by the priest's son Kost Levytsky. Nearly sixty percent of the members of the Ukrainian National Council, the legislative body of the Western Ukrainian People's Republic that ruled western Ukraine from 1918 to 1919, came from priestly families. The head of the Ukrainian Catholic Church, Andrey Sheptytsky, would be seen as a "father figure" for most western Ukrainians until his death in the 1940s.

== Impact on society and culture ==
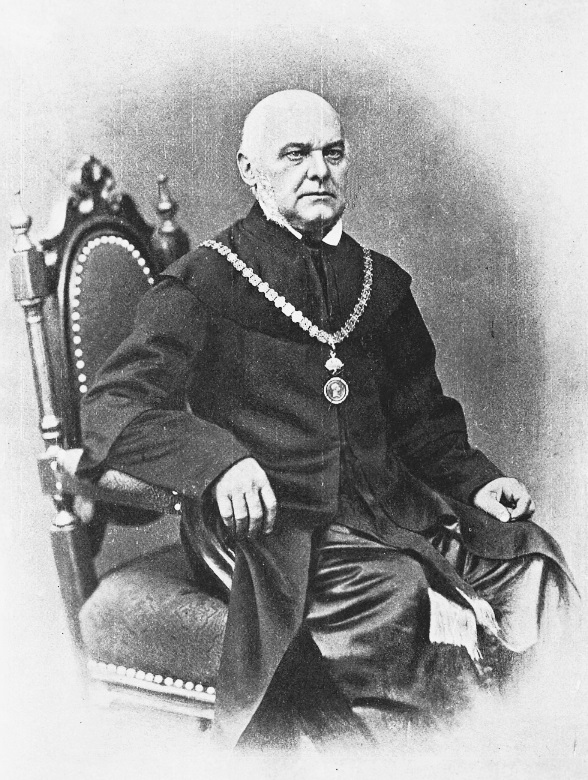
Yakiv Holovatsky, priest, President of Lviv University, one of the first publishers in the Ukrainian language who later became a major Russophile leader

Scholar Jean-Paul Himka has characterized the Galician clergy as having "an Orthodox face, Roman Catholic citizenship and an enlightened Austrian soul." This Austrianism manifested itself not only in loyalty to the Habsburg dynasty but also in following the role ascribed to them by the Austrian emperor as Enlighteners and educators of the Ukrainian community. Priests were heavily involved in spreading literacy in western Ukraine. The first West Ukrainian grammar of the Ukrainian language was published by a priest who also translated Goethe and Schiller into Ukrainian. Two thirds of the participants of a Congress of scholars called in 1848 to standardize the Ukrainian language and introduce educational reforms were members of the clergy. Priests actively supported the first Ukrainian newspaper, Zorya Halytska ("Galician Star"), either reading it aloud to illiterate peasants or having their cantors do so. Between 1842 and 1856 approximately 1,000 parish schools were established in the Lviv eparchy. Of 43 Ukrainian-language books published in Galicia between 1837 and 1850, 40 were written by members of the clergy. Ukrainian author Ivan Belei remarked that "Galician Rus may be the only place in the whole world where neither literature nor politics is possible without priestly support."

In 1831 seminarians were required by the head of the Church to take classes in agronomy because they were expected to introduce modern farming methods to the peasants. Many priests used their lands as "model farms," cultivating new varieties of grains or other plants. In one region, for example, priests planted the first apricot orchards. Some priests even taught agricultural methods from the pulpit.

Priests also founded temperance societies, reading clubs, and were significant figures in the Ukrainian cooperative movement. As an example of priests' impact in one community, in the village of Lanivtsi in southern Galicia, the local priestly dynasty established the community's credit union, local reading club, and child-care facilities.

The role of the clergy had a profound impact on the Ukrainian national movement. In contrast to the Polish intelligentsia, which largely derived from the lower nobility, the western Ukrainian intelligentsia largely derived from the clergy. Studying in Vienna, Ukrainian seminarians came into contact with the West at the time when Romantic nationalism and the virtues of the "People" had come to dominate modern thought in central Europe. The Ukrainian seminarians established contact with Czech students who were undertaking an extensive revival of their national culture and came to imitate their efforts.

Most of the leaders of the Ukrainian Women's Union (Soyuz Ukrainok) were the wives and daughters of priests.

The historical background of the Galician clergy contributed to a strong hostility and rivalry towards Poles, as well as a fierce sense of loyalty to Austria and the Habsburg dynasty by most Galician clerics. These attitudes were transmitted to their parishioners and thus reflected in Ukrainian society as a whole, earning western Ukrainians the nickname "Tyroleans of the East" for their loyalty to Austria. In the words of Ukrainian Catholic pilgrims visiting the tombs of the first two Austrian rulers to rule Ukraine, "lost deep in thought, we gazed at the coffins of Maria Theresa and her son Joseph, whose names are written in golden letters in our people's history."

== Daily life ==
=== Education ===
Prior to the annexation of Galicia by Austria, Ukrainian priests had typically been taught by their fathers, and their rudimentary education had been largely limited to the liturgy, basic knowledge of the Church Slavonic language and basic literacy. After the social and educational reforms that began with Austrian rule in the late 18th century, priests' children (typically future priests) attended elementary school in a small city not far from the village where their father had a parish and gymnasium in a larger city. The Austrians opened seminaries specifically for Ukrainian Catholic students in Vienna (1774) and Lviv (1783). All priests obtained four years of university-level education in one of these seminaries. They were required to study the three languages of Galicia: Ukrainian, Polish, and German; as well as Latin and Church Slavonic. Some priests knew other languages. Priests were expected to continue to educate themselves after they had been ordained. Exposure of seminarians to educated city girls in Vienna or Lviv led the seminarians to look down upon the manners of dress of rustic village girls. This led to the informal requirement that their potential brides (daughters of other priests) ought to be educated and conversant in fashionable literature, to be fluent in a foreign language, and to be able to play a musical instrument.

The university-level education of Galician priests differentiated them from the more modestly-educated Orthodox priests of the neighboring Russian Empire and contributed to the difficulty in the Russian Orthodox Church's attempts to gain converts among western Ukrainians during World War I.

=== Family life ===
A Ukrainian Catholic priest, Ihnatiy Tsehelsky and his bride

The vast majority of clergy had families. In 1894, only 3 percent of Galician priests were celibate. Although seminarians spent the school year studying in the cities of Vienna or Lviv, they spent their summer vacations courting in various Ukrainian villages. Priests married prior to their ordination at about 26 years of age. Their brides were usually the daughters of other priests. After being ordained, the priests typically spent ten to twenty-five years in being transferred to different parishes before settling in one place as its pastor.

The family of the Ukrainian Catholic priest had three sources of income. A modest government salary was sufficient for household expenses and to pay for one son's education. Priests also made money from sizable farms (priests' landholdings were larger than those of peasants and typically varied in size from 12.5 to 50 hectares, compared to 2.8 hectares owned by the average peasant) and from sacramental fees for burials, weddings, christenings, etc. Due to their level of income the Ukrainian priests were typically the wealthiest Ukrainians in their villages. However, they often felt poor because their living expenses were much higher than those of peasants. Ukrainian priests were expected to educate all of their sons, a financial burden that drove some of them into debt. They were also expected to subscribe to various newspapers, to make charitable contributions and to dress and eat better than peasants. Priestly income also paid for their daughters' dowries, buying and repairing carriages, investments for the farm, and clothing for their wives to wear in society, often imported from Vienna or Paris.

Reflecting the clergy's role as community leaders and organizers, family life usually centred not on religion but on political and social questions. According to the memoirs of one priest's son, his own family and that of other priests were "honorable" but much more concerned about national than religious issues. Conversations centred on economic concerns, village affairs and politics, and in his and other priestly families, moral or religious matters were not discussed. Despite the role of the Ukrainian clergy within the Ukrainian national revival, the clergy's educational and social status resulted in the Polish language being the language of daily use by most clerical families until the end of the 19th century.

Priests' wives were also active in the community. They administered "folk medicine" in their communities and cultivated and administered herbs, grasses and other plants with supposed medicinal value.

John-Paul Himka described the lives of several priests. Amvrozii de Krushelnytsky (1841–1903), father of Ukrainian opera singer Solomiya Krushelnytska. The son of a priest of noble origins, he served in a parish that was endowed with 91.5 hectares of arable land, an orchard and beehives. He had six daughters and two sons and found it difficult to meet his financial obligations. He paid for tutors for all of his children but went into debt for many years in order to pay for his daughter Solomiya's conservatory. Krushelnytsky was fluent in several languages and enjoyed foreign literature (Goethe, Schiller, Shakespeare) and Ukrainian literature (Taras Shevchenko and Ivan Franko), and was able to visit his daughter in Milan in 1894 and Vienna in 1895. He encouraged the peasants to educate their children, was a member of Prosvita, and organized a choir in his parish; he also taught the violin. Danylo Taniachkevych (1842–1906) served in a parish with an endowment of only 8 hectares of arable land. He studied in Lviv, belonged to Prosvita, founded reading societies, and was a deputy in the Austrian parliament for three years. Taniachkevych adopted and cared for the six children of his deceased father-in-law; this drove him into debt and poverty to such an extent that his family often went hungry.

== Prominent Western Ukrainians with ties to the clergy ==
- Stepan Bandera, Ukrainian nationalist leader; his father Andriy Bandera was a priest and mother was a priest's daughter
- Oleksander Barvinsky, creator of Ukrainian-language textbooks, founder of Christian Social Party in Ukraine, secretary of education and religious affairs of the West Ukrainian National Republic; priest's son
- Anton Beskid, governor of Subcarpathian Rus', leader of the Russian National Party; from a clerical family
- Cyrill Blonski, member of the Imperial Diet of the Austrian Empire; priest and his son Tit Blonski became a priest
- Ivan Bobersky, teacher, treasurer of the Ukrainian Sich Riflemen; from a clerical family
- Kostyantyn Chekhovych, bishop and son of a priest
- Adolf Dobriansky, leader of the Rusyn movement, member of the Hungarian parliament; son and grandson of priests
- Antin Dobriansky, historian and member of the Diet of Galicia and Lodomeria; decan and son of a priest
- Thomas Dolinay, second bishop of the Byzantine Catholic Metropolitan Church of Pittsburgh; son of a priest
- Alexander Dukhnovych, poet and activist for the Russophile movement; priest and son of a priest
- Stefan Fentsik, founder of the Russian National Autonomous Party, member of the Hungarian parliament; priest, son of a priest, his uncles Eugeniy Fentsik and Irinej Legeza were priests
- Cyrill Gamorak, member of the Diet of Galicia and Lodomeria; priest and son of a priest
- Pavel Peter Gojdič, prisoner of conscience; eparch and son of a priest
- Pavlo Hayda, Ukrainian-American priest and activist in the Ukrainian Community of Chicago, Illinois, grandfather was a priest, mother daughter of a priest, direct descendant of Yov Knyahynetsky.
- Vasyl Hadjeha, founding member of the Prosvita, prelate and son of a priest
- Ivan Halushchynskyi, chairman of Ridna Shkola; father and his brother Teodosii Halushchynskyi were priests
- Mykhailo Halushchynskyi, chairman of Prosvita, co-founder of the Ukrainian National Democratic Alliance, Deputy Marshal of the Senate of Poland and member of the Sejm; brother of Ivan Halushchynskyi
- Mikołaj Hlibowicki, member of the Imperial Council of the Austrian Empire; son of a priest
- Yakiv Holovatsky, major Russophile leader and one-time president of Lviv University; priest and son of a priest
- Konstantin Hrabar, governor of Subcarpathian Rus'; from a clerical family
- Oleksii Hunovskyi, composer and head of the Chortkiv District National Council of the West Ukrainian People's Republic; priest, co-father-in-law of Antonii Kaznovskyi (the son-in-law of Omelian Hlibovytskyi)
- Ivan Hrynokh, vice president of the Ukrainian Supreme Liberation Council, priest
- Jaroslav Kacmarcyk, president of Lemko Republic, son of a priest and grandson of a priest
- Solomiya Krushelnytska, Opera singer; father Amvrosii Krushelnytskyi and matrilineal grandfather Hryhorii Savchynskyi were priests and part of the wider Krushelnytskyi family
- Roman Kupchynskyi, poet, writer, and journalist; son of a priest
- Olena Kysilevska, member of the Polish Senate for the Ukrainian National Democratic Alliance; from a clerical family
- Bohdan Lepky, writer; father Sylvester Lepkyi, matrilineal grandfather Mykhailo Hlibovytskyi and matrilineal uncle Omelian Hlibovytskyi were priests
- Kost Levytsky, head of the Secretariate of the West Ukrainian People's Republic and cofounder and head of the Ukrainian National Democratic Party; son of a priest
- Wenedykt Levytsky, member of the Supreme Ruthenian Council and Privy Councillor; priest and son of a priest
- Yuriy Lopatynsky, colonel of the Ukrainian Insurgent Army, son of a priest
- Ivan Naumovych, major Russophile ideologist and activist, member of Austrian parliament. A priest from a clerical family who was excommunicated and then joined the Russian Orthodox Church
- Ostap Nyzhankivsky, writer and compose; priest and son of a priest
- Teofil Pawlykiw, member of the Diet of Galicia and Lodomeria; priest and from a clerical family
- Anthony Petrushevych, historian and linguist; priest from a clerical family
- Łew Petrushevych, member of the Ukrainian National Council; nephew of Yevhen Petrushevych and his father Stepan Petrushevych was a priest
- Yevhen Petrushevych, leader of the Ukrainian delegates to Austria's parliament and then president of the Western Ukrainian National Republic; priest's son
- Omelian Pleshkevych, co-founder of Selfreliance Ukrainian American Credit Union, president of World Council of Ukrainian Credit Unions; son and grandson of priests
- Toma Polyanskyi, bishop and son of a priest
- Markiyan Shashkevych, publisher of the first collection of Ukrainian-language literature in western Ukraine; priest and from a clerical family
- Andrey Sheptytsky, Metropolitan Archbishop of the Ukrainian Greek Catholic Church from 1901 until his death in 1944; seen as a "father figure" by most Western Ukrainians. Brother of Klymentiy Sheptytsky and part of the wider Szeptycki family.
- Mykola Skorodynskyi, bishop and son of a priest
- Yaroslav Stetsko prominent member of the Organization of Ukrainian Nationalists and Prime Minister of the self-proclaimed Independent Ukrainian Republic, priest's son
- Kyryl Studynsky, long-time head of the Shevchenko Scientific Society, and head of the People's Assembly of Western Ukraine; led the delegation to Moscow that formally requested the inclusion of Western Ukraine to the Soviet Union; from a clerical family
- Basil Takach, first bishop of the Byzantine Catholic Metropolitan Church of Pittsburgh; from a clerical family
- Myron Tarnavsky, supreme commander of the Ukrainian Galician Army, priest's son from an ancient clerical family
- Oleh Tyahnybok, head of the right-wing Svoboda Party, descended from a brother of Lonhyn Tsehelsky.
- Lonhyn Tsehelsky, interior and foreign secretary of the Western Ukrainian People's Republic and a founder of the Ukrainian Congress Committee of America; priest's son
- Kornylo Ustiyanovych, painter; father Mykola Ustiyanovych was a priest and member of the Diet of Galicia and Lodomeria
- Anatole Vakhnianyn, founder of Prosvita as well as the Lviv Conservatory; son and grandson of priests
- Ivan Volansky, founder of the first Greek Catholic parish in the United States; priest and son of a priest
- Avgustyn Voloshyn, president of Carpatho-Ukraine, founder of the Christian People's Party; priest

== See also ==
- Gentry
- Clerical marriage
- Priestly caste
- Ukrainian Greek Catholic Church
