= Ukrainophilia =

Affinity towards the Ukrainian people

The flag of Ukraine, which has appeared in variations of this modern design since the 19th century.

Ukrainophilia is the feeling or expression of interest in, respect for, and appreciation of Ukrainians on the part of a non-Ukrainian. More specifically, a Ukrainophile is someone who has a strong appreciation or affinity for Ukraine and the Ukrainian people, with an admiration for their language and literature, culture (art, music, cuisine, etc.), history, or government. The opposite sentiment is Ukrainophobia. Ukrainophilism also refers to the Ukrainian nationalist movement from the 1860s–1880s, whereafter it acquired a negative connotation among the next generation of Ukrainian nationalists.

The term is most often used in a political context; Ukrainian nationalism and the associated assertion of Ukraine's distinct culture, history, and national rights has historically been a core theme of the nation's cultural, social, and legal struggle against Russification and other manifestations of Russian imperialism. Since the dissolution of the Soviet Union in 1991, Ukrainophile sentiment has become more widespread in the Western world due to Ukraine's strained relationship with Russia, culminating in the outbreak of the Russo-Ukrainian War in 2014 and increasing significantly since the Russian invasion of Ukraine in 2022.

== History of the sociopolitical movement ==
The Ukrainophile movement developed among ethnic Ukrainian intellectuals in the Russian Empire and in Galicia, where it was also known as Narodovtsi, in the second half of the 19th century. Ukrainophiles sought to preserve and develop the Ukrainian language, literature and culture. They called for the introduction of the Ukrainian language in Ukrainian schools and the autonomy from the Russian Empire, which would allow for national self-determination of Ukrainians and the free development of Ukrainian culture.

Ukrainophilia in the 19th century included various degrees of intensity, ranging from the simple love of one's people to passionate nationalism and independence.

The Ukrainophile movement in Russian literature led to the publishing of books and textbooks in the Ukrainian language. Ukrainophile intellectuals published a number of journals, including Osnova in St. Petersburg (1861–1862), Chernigovskiy Listok, Samostaine Slovo, Hromadnytsia, and Pomyinytsia. They also sought to popularize the Ukrainian language by publishing pamphlets in Ukrainian. Ukrainophiles of the Russian Empire also created a network of Ukrainophile organizations, the most important of which were in St. Petersburg, Moscow, Kyiv, Kharkiv, Chernihiv, Poltava and Odesa, which actively sought to organize Ukrainian-language instruction in schools.

In the first half of the 19th century, many Ukrainophiles were also Polish nationalists who sought to form the Polish-Lithuanian-Ruthenian Commonwealth, a reformed Poland-Lithuania with Ruthenia/Ukraine as a third coequal partner in the federation. After the 1830-1831 Polish uprising against the Russian Empire, Polish Ukrainophiles and Ukrainians of Polish origins, seeking allies against Russia, played a major role in the Ukrainian cultural movements and fomented anti-Russian sentiment by referring to the Ukrainians as Rus', which they distinguished from Muscovy (Russia).

After the Russian Empire crushed the Polish uprising of 1863, the Russian government put intense pressure on the Ukrainophile movement (Valuyev Circular in 1863, Ems Ukaz in 1876), but the movement continued flaring up, especially in the early 1870s and late 1880s. After the movement was repressed, most of its members turned their attention away from political organizing to literary work, such as creating Ukrainian dictionaries, writing Ukrainian books, and developing the discipline of Ukrainian studies. The Ukrainophilism movement had a large bearing on the initially pacifist and pro-dialogue Ukrainian People's Republic established following the 1917 February Revolution, thus marking the start of the Ukrainian War of Independence, although it militarized in response to Bolshevik hostility following the October Revolution and the start of the Russian Civil War, in which it would be defeated and Ukrainian lands partitioned in 1921 with the Treaty of Riga. During the Soviet period the Ukrainophile movement was characterized as a "bourgeois-national" movement.

== Modern prevalence ==
Ukrainophilia exists among the Ukrainian diaspora in Russia, North America and elsewhere.

=== Canada ===
Canadians show many Ukrainophilic tendencies, owing in part to the legacy of Watson Kirkconnell and the presence of a large Ukrainian diaspora.

=== Israel ===
In the 1990s many Jewish people emigrated from the former Soviet states, especially from Ukraine, to Israel. Jewish Ukrainians had lived in Ukraine for centuries, having partially assimilated, intermarried and adopted the culture of the people that they lived among. Even today many Ukrainian Jews in Israel feel a sense of connection to and pride with Ukraine, and are still influenced by Ukrainian culture, language and food.

=== Poland ===
Poland was one of the first countries to recognise the independence of Ukraine, and a 2022 opinion poll put Polish support for Ukraine at the beginning of the Russian invasion of Ukraine at 71%. Poland also accepted over a million Ukrainian refugees fleeing the war, but the attitude of Poles towards them have since soured, according to a survey published in June 2024. Relations have also been troubled over trade disputes concerning the influx of cheaper Ukrainian grain into the European Union, with Polish farmers voicing their displeasure by blockading the Polish-Ukrainian border. Polish prime minister Donald Tusk warned that the conflict could lead to "sudden anti-Ukrainian sentiment" in the country.

Prior to World War II, the Second Polish Republic restricted rights of people who declared Ukrainian nationality, belonged to the Eastern Orthodox Church and inhabited the Eastern Borderlands, in reaction to a wave of sabotage and terrorist attacks perpetrated by Ukrainian nationalists. (Note: Snyder writes: "In July 1930, Ukrainian nationalists began sabotage actions in Galicia, destroying Polish properties and homes throughout the region in hundreds of terrorist actions. In September, Piłsudski ordered the pacification of Galicia, sending a thousand policemen to search 450 villages for nationalist agitators... "In 1930, as the OUN terrorized the Galician countryside...Volhynia remained comparatively peaceful...")

=== Romania ===
Since the start of the Russian invasion of Ukraine, around 600,000 Ukrainians have fled to Romania, with both countries signing a security cooperation agreement in 2024. Historically, much like the Poles, the Romanians too had land disputes with the Ukrainians, mostly surrounding the historically Romanian controlled regions like Budzhak and Northern Bukovina, which are now owned by Ukraine.

Historically, many Ukrainians also emigrated to Romania from the USSR. Today, Ukrainians are the third-largest ethnic minority in Romania. 2021 Romanian census puts their number at 45,835 people, although Ukrainian sources declare the number to be over 250,000 people.

The current president of Romania, Nicușor Dan, elected in 2025, advocates for strong relations with Ukraine. Similar pro-Ukrainian positions were also expressed by the Romanian Foreign Minister Oana Țoiu.

== See also ==
- Ukrainian nationalism
- Slavophile
- Ukrainization
- Ukrainophone

== Sources ==
- Іван Куций. УКРАЇНОФІЛЬСЬКА ТЕЧІЯ ГАЛИЦЬКОЇ ІСТОРІОГРАФІЇ XIX ст.: КОНЦЕПТУАЛІЗАЦІЯ ІСТОРИЧНО-ЦИВІЛІЗАЦІЙНОЇ ІДЕНТИЧНОСТІ // Історіографічні дослідження в Україні. Випуск 18. Київ: Інститут історії України НАН України, 2008
- Житецький І. Київ. Громада за 60-их років, ж. Україна, 1928, кн. 1;
- Савченко Ф. Заборона українства 1876 p. K. 1930 (2 вид. Мюнхен 1970, де подано докладну бібліографію). Чимало мемуарного матеріалу в ж. Україна, 1924 — 30 pp. і в зб. За сто літ, І — VI.
- Енциклопедія українознавства. У 10-х т. / Гол. ред. Володимир Кубійович. — Париж; Нью-Йорк: Молоде Життя, 1954–1989.
