= Ivan Volansky =

Ukrainian Greek Catholic priest (1857–1926)

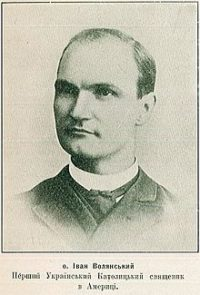
- Native name: Іван Волянський
- Church: Catholic Church; Ukrainian Greek Catholic Church

Personal details
- Born: July 2, 1857 Yabluniv, Austria-Hungary (now Ukraine)
- Died: August 1, 1926 (aged 69) Dychkiv, Second Polish Republic (now Ukraine)

Ivan Volansky (Note: Ukrainian: Іван Якович Волянський, romanized: Ivan Yakovych Volianskyi) (July 2, 1857 – August 1, 1926) was a Ukrainian Greek Catholic priest and community leader in Galicia, the United States, and Brazil. He is recognized as the first Greek Catholic priest to serve in the United States, where he organized the first Ukrainian parish and helped establish cultural and social institutions for immigrants.

== Early life and education ==
Volansky was born on July 2, 1857, in Yabluniv, then part of the Austrian Empire (now Husiatyn Raion, Ternopil Oblast, Ukraine), into the family of priest Yakiv Volansky and Teklia (née Matselynska). He studied at the state gymnasium in Ternopil, graduating in 1875, and later entered the Lviv Theological Seminary. In 1875–1877 he continued his studies at the Greek Catholic Central Seminary in Vienna and also attended the University of Vienna. He was ordained a married priest in 1880 and served in parishes in Krylos, Nastasiv, and Nyrkiv between 1880 and 1884.

== Mission in the United States ==
In 1884, after a petition by Ukrainian immigrants to the Metropolitan of Lviv, Volansky was sent to the United States, arriving in Shenandoah, Pennsylvania. Before his arrival, Ukrainian Greek Catholic immigrants attended local Latin Rite Roman Catholic churches. His married status initially created difficulties in being recognized by the local Catholic hierarchy.

In 1886 he organized St. Michael's Greek Catholic Church in Shenandoah, the first parish of its kind in the United States, and served there until 1889. He also became head of the “Association of Ruthenian Brotherhoods” and was active in organizing choirs, schools, and cooperative associations. In 1886–1887 he founded and edited Ameryka, the first Ukrainian-language newspaper published in the United States.

Volansky later assisted in establishing several other parishes in Pennsylvania, as well as in New Jersey and Minnesota. His activity in founding churches, fraternal societies, and cultural initiatives has been described as symbolizing the vital role of the church in the life of Ukrainian Americans.

== Return to Galicia and mission in Brazil ==
In 1889 Volansky returned to Galicia, serving as parish priest in Ostrivets near Terebovlia until 1913. From 1896 to 1898 he visited Ukrainian settlements in Brazil to study conditions for potential emigrants. His wife died in Rio de Janeiro during this mission. Volansky reported his observations in the Ukrainian-American press, warning against resettlement in regions with harsh climates and poor conditions.

As dean of Terebovlia (1906–1913), he organized reading rooms, choirs, branches of the Prosvita society, and cooperatives, and chaired the supervisory board of the credit association “Pomich.”

== Later years ==
In 1913 Volansky became parish priest in Dychkiv, near Ternopil, and in 1918 was appointed to mission work in the regions of Chełm, Volhynia, and Belarus. In 1919, due to his patriotic activities, he was arrested by the Polish authorities and imprisoned in a concentration camp in Modlin near Warsaw for six months.

He died on August 1, 1926, in Dychkiv and was buried there.

== See also ==
- Ukrainian Americans
- Ukrainian Greek Catholic Church
