= Vasyl Barvinsky =

Ukrainian composer

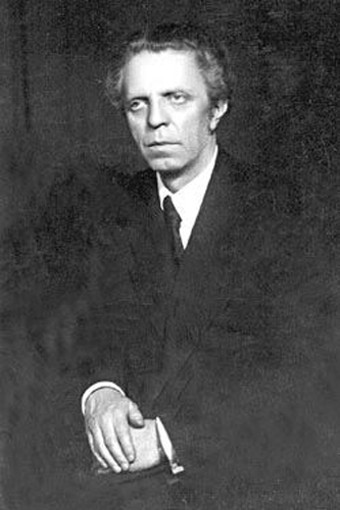
- Barvinsky in 1920
- Born: 20 February 1888; Tarnopol, Kingdom of Galicia and Lodomeria, Austria-Hungary
- Died: 9 June 1963 (aged 75); Lviv, Ukrainian SSR, USSR
- Education: Lemberg Conservatory
- Occupations: Pianist, Composer, Director of the Lysenko Institute in Lviv, Teacher
- Years active: 1910s–1960s

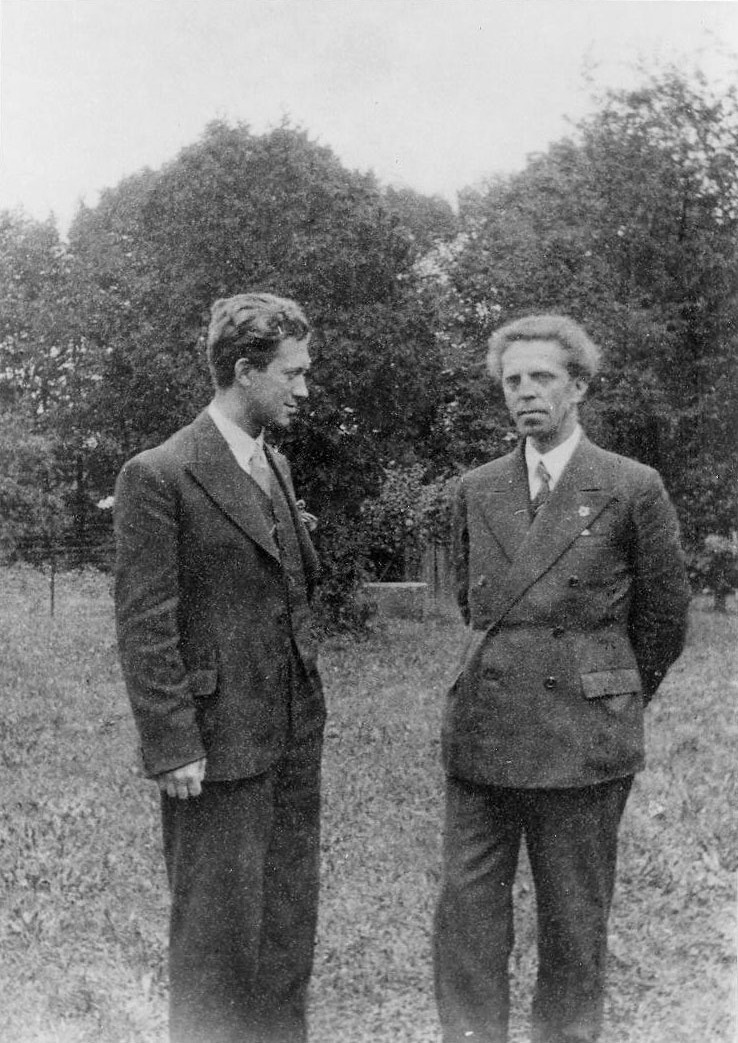
Composer Joseph Beer ca. 1926 with Vasyl Barvinsky (right)

Vasyl Oleksandrovych Barvinsky (Ukrainian: Василь Олександрович Барвінський) (20 February 1888 – 9 June 1963) was a Ukrainian composer, pianist, conductor, teacher, musicologist, and music related social figure.

Barvinsky was one of the first Ukrainian composers to gain worldwide recognition. His pieces were published not only in the Soviet Union, but also in Vienna, Leipzig, New York (Universal Edition), and Japan. Barvinsky directed a post-secondary musical institution in the city of Lviv (1915-1948) the Lysenko Higher Institute of Music, and was considered to be the head of musical life at the time. Currently there is a College of Music named after Barvinsky in Drohobych, Ukraine.

== Life ==
Vasyl Barvinsky was born in Ternopil, on 20 February 1888. Barvinsky descended from an older aristocratic family. Barvinsky's father, Oleksander Barvinsky, was a Ukrainian pedagogue, politician, and public figure. In 1917 he was appointed a member of the Austrian upper chamber. Vasyl's mother, singer and pianist, Yevheniya Barvinska, became his first music teacher. Barvinsky married Natalia Puluj, the daughter of scientist of radiology Ivan Puluj.

In 1939 he founded Lviv Secondary Specialized Music Boarding School named after Solomiya Krushelnytska.

In January 1948 Barvinsky and his wife were arrested by the NKVD. He was sentenced to 10 years imprisonment by the Soviet authorities. He was exiled to a GULAG in Mordovia, at which time most of his printed and handwritten works were burned under mysterious circumstances in Lviv. After his release in 1958, he attempted to reconstruct works that had been destroyed, but he died on 9 June 1963, before completing this work. Many of the lost works were not rediscovered until after his death. Many works were lost forever. Barvinsky was posthumously rehabilitated in 1964.

He was buried in Lviv in the family tomb in Lychakiv Cemetery, field number three.

== Education ==
Barvinsky gained professional music education in Lviv conservatory. Barvinsky continued his music education in Prague. Among his teachers were Vilém Kurz (piano), and Vítězslav Novák (composition). When he began to teach, one of his first students was Stefania Turkewich.

== Works ==
Barvinsky wrote about 30 works. Barvinsky's compositions are said to be impressive by their “… matureness’, thoughtfulness and delicacy”. Barvinsky composed in various genres except ballet and opera. His style, late romantic with impressionistic features, was also strongly influenced by Ukrainian folklore. Although many of Barvinsky's works were lost, most of his creative inheritance remained and is performed worldwide.

== Compositions ==
=== Orchestra ===
- "Ukrainian Rhapsody" (Ukrayinska Rapsodiya – Українська рапсодія) (1911)

=== Piano ===
- Piano cycle "Love" (Liubov – Любов)
- Piano Sonata in D♭ major
- Piano Trio in A minor
- Piano Preludes
- Piano Concerto in F minor
- Five miniatures on Ukrainian folk themes
- Cycle for piano "Koliadky i Shchedrivky" (Колядки і щедрівки)
- Piano collection for children: "Our Sun is Playing Piano" (Nashe Sonechko Hraye na Fortepiano - Наше сонечко грає на фортепіано)
- "Ukrainian Suite" (Ukrayinska syuyita – Українська сюїта)
- "Lemkiv's Suite" (Lemkivshchyna) (Lemkivska syuyita – Лемківська сюїта)
- "Lemkiv's Dances" (Lemkivski tantsi – Лемківські танці)
- Six Solo Arrangements of Folk Songs, composed in 1912
  Yanhil-yahilochka (Ягіл-ягілочка)
  Oi, khodyla divchyna berizhkom (Ой, ходила дівчина беріжком)
  Chy ty virno mene liubysh (Чи ти вірно мене любиш)
  Vyishly v pole kosari (Вийшли в поле косарі)
  Oi, ziydy, ziydy, yasen misiatsiu (Ой, зійди, зійди, ясен місяцю)
  Lullaby Oi Khodyt Son (Ой ходиь сон)

=== Choir miniature ===
- "The Sun is Already Down" (Uzhe sonechko zakotylosia – Уже Сонечко Закотилося)

=== Children choir ===
- "On the Christmas Tree" (Na yalynku – На ялинку)
- "Summer" (Lito – Літо)
- "The song of pupils" (Pisnia Shkoliariv – Пісня школярів)

=== Folk-song arrangements ===
- "There on the Hill are Two Oaklets" (Tam na hori dva dubky – Там на горі два дубки)
- "Two Lemkiv's folk songs" (Dvi lemkivski narodni pisni – Дві Лемківські народні пісні)

=== Chamber music ===
- Sonata for Cello and Piano
- Nocturne for Cello (1910)
- Variations on folk-song theme for Cello (1918) (Variatsiyi na temu narodnoyi pisni "Oi, pyla, pyla ta Lymerykha na medu" – Варіації на тему народної пісні "Ой, пила, пила та Лимериха на меду")
- "Dumka" for Viola (1920) (Думка)
- Sonata and Suite for Viola and Piano
- Suite for Viola (1927)
- Sextet for piano and five string instruments
- String Quartet "Molodijniy" (published in 1941)
- String Quartet in B♭ major
- For Violin: "Humoreska", "Sumna Pisnia", "Kozachok", "Metelytsia", "Pisnia bez sliv" also known as "Harodna Melodiya"

== Music related literary works ==
- "Bela Bartok in Lviv" (Bela Bartok U Lvovi – Бела Барток у Львові)
- "An overview of Ukrainian Music History" (Ohliad istoriyi ukrayinskoyi muzyky - Огляд історії української музики)
- "Ukrainian Music" (Ukrayinska muzyka -Українська музика)
- "The New Age of Ukrainian Music" (co-authored by Steshko and Liudkevych) (Nova doba ukrainskoyi muzyky – Нова доба української музики)
- "My Memories about Mykola Lysenko" (1937) (Moyi spohady pro Mykolu Lysenka – Мої спогади про Миколу Лисенка)
- "Viktor Kosenko" (1939)
- "Creative Work of V. Novak" (Tvorchist V. Novaka – Творчість В. Новака)
- "Ukrainian Folk Song and Ukrainian Composers" (Prague 1914) (Ukrayinska narodna pisnia i ukrayinski kompozytory – Українська народна пісня і українські композитори)
- "Characteristics of Ukrainian folk song and its Research" (Kharakterystyka ukrayinskoyi narodnoyi pisni ta yiyi doslidzhennia – Характеристика української народної пісні та її дослідження)

== Bibliography ==
- Dytyniak Maria Ukrainian Composers - A Bio-bibliographic Guide - Research report No. 14, 1896, Canadian Institute of Ukrainian Studies, University of Alberta, Canada.
