= Yevheniya Barvinska =

Ukrainian pianist (1854–1913)

Yevheniia Maksymovna Barvinska
- Born: Yevheniia Liubovych; 20 December 1854; Lemburg, Kingdom of Galicia and Lodomeria, Austrian Empire
- Died: 20 December 1913 (aged 59); Lemburg, Kingdom of Galicia and Lodomeria, Austria-Hungary (today Lviv, Ukraine)
- Burial place: Lychakiv Cemetery
- Occupations: Pianist, conductor, soprano
- Spouse: Oleksander Barvinsky
- Children: Six

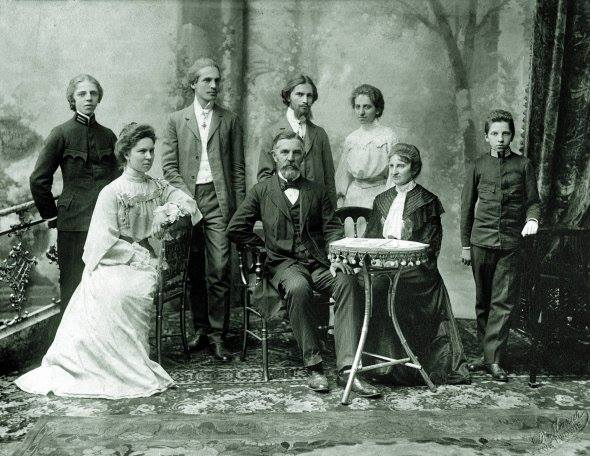
Yevheniya Lubovych Barvinska seated at the table next to her husband Oleksander Barvinsky, surrounded by their six children. From left to right: Vasyl Barvinskyi; Olha Bachynska; Bohdan Barvinskyi; Roman Barvinskyi; Olena Savchuk; Oleksander Barvinskyi

Yevheniia Maksymivna Barvinska or Yevheniya Barvinsʼka (nee Liubovych, 1854–1913), was a Ukrainian pianist, choral conductor and singer (soprano), who promoted the music of Ukrainian composers.

== Biography ==
Yevheniia Liubovych was born on 20 December 1854 in Lemburg, Austrian Galicia (today Lviv, Ukraine) to Maksymiliian Liubovych and Olena Studynska.

She graduated from the Teachers' Institute, Lemburg, in 1874, and studied piano privately with Karol Mikuli, the director of the Lemberg Conservatory. Her next music teacher, Fr. Amvrosii, was the Ukrainian Greek Catholic priest Amvrosii Krushelnytskyi, whose daughter, Solomiya Krushelnytska, was a friend and who gained international fame as a soprano. With Fr. Amvrosii, Yevheniia organized and conducted the men's and women's choirs in Ternopil (1882–1886).

Yevheniia married the educator and politician Oleksander Barvinsky (1847–1926) and they raised six children, Olha Bachynska (1874–1955), Bohdan Barvinskyi (1880–1958), Roman (1881–1947), Olena Savchuk (1883–1962), Vasyl Barvinsky (1888–1963) and Oleksander Barvinskyi (1889–1957). Vasyl, whose first music teacher was Yevheniia, went on to become an accomplished composer later in life.

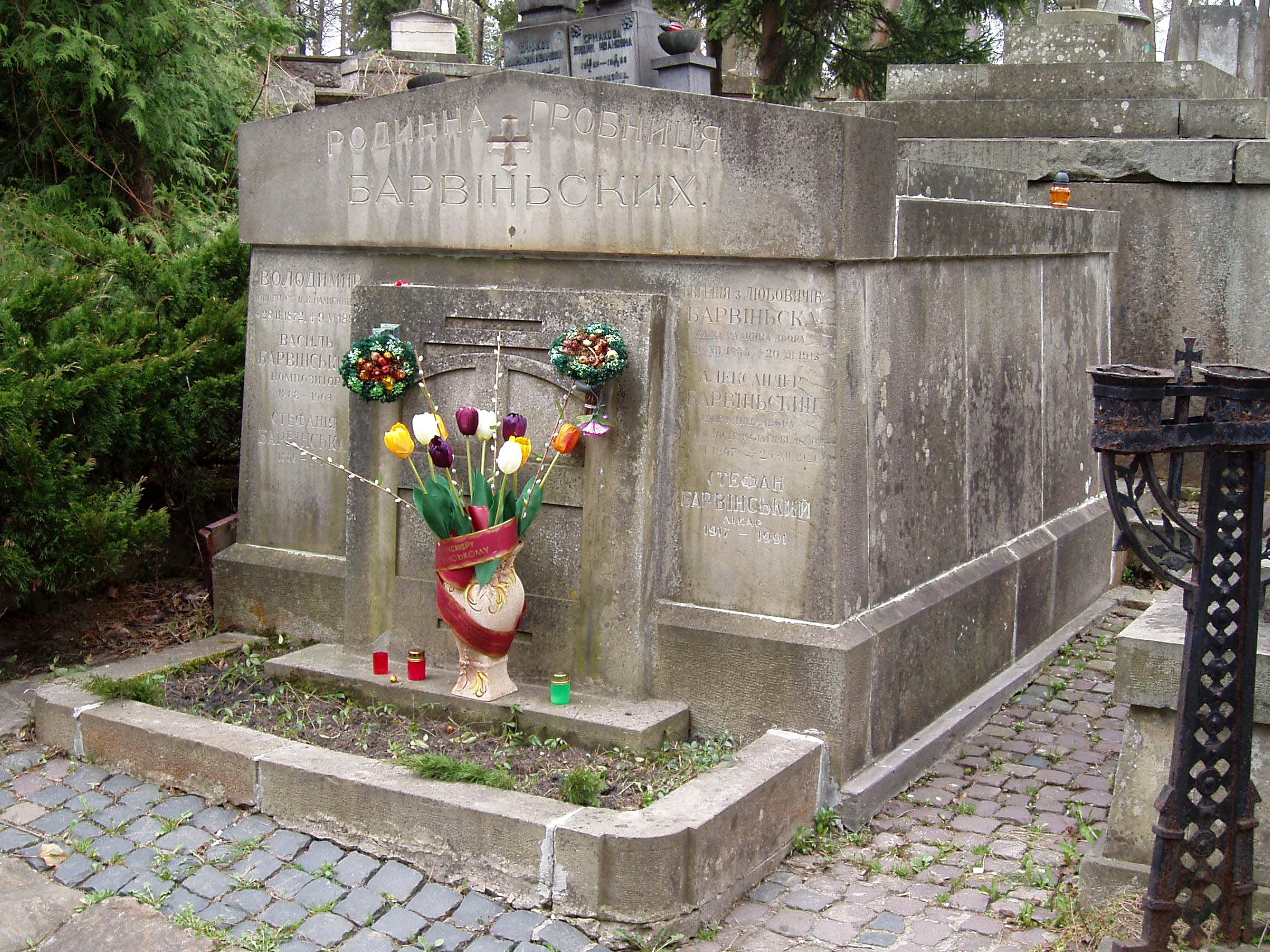
Tomb of Barvinskyi family.

In 1891, Yevheniia Barvinska became the conductor of the Lemburg choir of the Boyan Society through which she continued to promote the work of Ukrainian composers.

Barvinska died on 20 December 1913 in Lemburg.
