= Oleksander Barvinsky =

Ukrainian politician

Oleksandr Barvinsky
- Олександр Барвінський
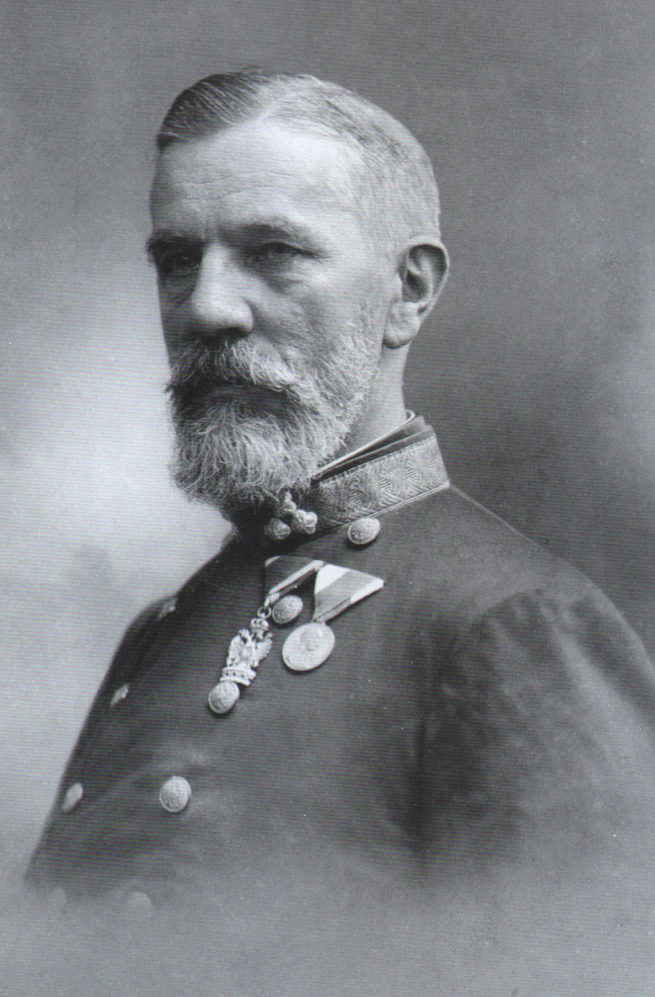
- Oleksandr Barvinsky in 1904.

Secretary of Education of West Ukraine
- In office November 9, 1918 – January 4, 1919
- Prime Minister: Kost Levytsky
- Preceded by: post created
- Succeeded by: Ahenor Artymovych

Chairman of Shevchenko Scientific Society
- In office 1893–1897
- Preceded by: Julian Celewycz
- Succeeded by: Mykhailo Hrushevsky

Leader of Catholic Social Movement
- In office 1896–1926

Deputy of Imperial Council
- In office 1891–1907
- In office 1917–1918

Deputy of Galician Diet
- In office 1894–1904

Personal details
- Born: Oleksandr Hryhorovych Barvinsky; 8 June 1847 Shliakhtyntsi, Kingdom of Galicia and Lodomeria, Austrian Empire (now Shliakhtyntsi, Ternopil Raion, Ternopil Oblast, Ukraine)
- Died: 25 December 1926 (aged 79) Lwow, Poland (now Lviv, Lviv Raion, Lviv Oblast, Ukraine)
- Party: Christian Social Party
- Education: Lviv University
- Occupation: Academician, politician, pedagogue

Oleksandr Hryhorovych Barvinsky (Ukrainian: Олександр Григорович Барвiнський) (June 8, 1847 – December 25, 1926) was an important western Ukrainian cultural figure and politician, a founder of the Christian Social Party in western Ukraine. He also was a member of the Austrian parliament, chaired the Shevchenko Scientific Society and held the post of secretary of education and religious affairs of the West Ukrainian National Republic. It was during his chairmanship that the Shevchenko Scientific Society was turned into a well established academy of sciences.

== Biography ==
Oleksandr Barvinsky was born on June 8, 1847, in Shliakhtyntsi, a village near Ternopil in western Ukraine (at the time, part of Austria-Hungary), into the family of a Ukrainian Catholic priest. Like many Western-Ukrainian priestly families Barvinskys were of noble origin and belonged to Jastrzębiec coat of arms.

From 1868 he began teaching at gymnasiums (secondary schools) in western Ukraine until 1888, when he began teaching at Lviv's teacher's seminary and later the theological seminary. Collaborating with Panteleimon Kulish, Barvinsky helped create textbooks for Ukrainian schools, and was largely responsible for the use of Ukrainian orthography and for the term of Ruthenian-Ukrainian within the schools in eastern Galicia.

In 1890, Barvinsky was one of the initiators of the "New Era" policy among Ukrainian political leaders, calling for rapprochement between Poles and Ukrainians. Even after most Ukrainian leaders abandoned this approach by 1894, Barvinsky along with Anatole Vakhnianyn refused to reconsider their positions and together with him formed the political party "Catholic Ruthenian-Social Union". A prominent community organizer and Ukrainophile activist, in 1891 he was elected to the Austrian parliament in Vienna, where he served until 1907. From 1894 until 1904 he was a member of the local Galician Diet. In 1917 Barvinsky became a member of the Austrian upper chamber (House of Lords). When Austria-Hungary fell apart following the First World War, Barvinsky became the minister of education and religious affairs of the West Ukrainian National Republic, retiring from political life after the Poles captured the capital of Lviv.

== Personal life ==
Before 1880, he married the pianist, choral director and soprano Yevheniya Barvinska (1854–1913) and they raised six children, Olga Bachynska (1874–1955), Bogdan Barvinsky (1880–1958), Roman (1881–1947), Olena Savchuk (1883–1962), Vasyl Barvinsky (1888–1963) and Alexander Barvinsky (1889–1957).

== Bibliography ==
- Small Dictionary of History of Ukraine/Chief Editor Valeriy Smoliy. "Lybid". Kyiv, 1997.
- Melnychuk, B. Khanas, V. Oleksandr Hryhorovych Barvinsky/Ternopil Encyclopedic Dictionary. Vol.1. "Zbruch" Ternopil, 2004. ISBN 966-528-197-6
- Seredyak,А. Outline of Prosvita history. Lviv, 1993. pp. 120–121
- Kachkan, V. Ukrainian Social Studies in names. Vol.2. Kyiv, 1997. pp. 45–54
- Liberny,О. Oleksandr of the Barvinsky constellation... "Svoboda". 1997
- Chornovil,І. Political realism of O.Barvinsky "Suchasnist". #1. 1998. pp. 99–105
