= Pavlo Movchan =

Ukrainian poet and politician (born 1939)

Merited Artist of Ukraine Pavlo Movchan
- Павло Мовчан
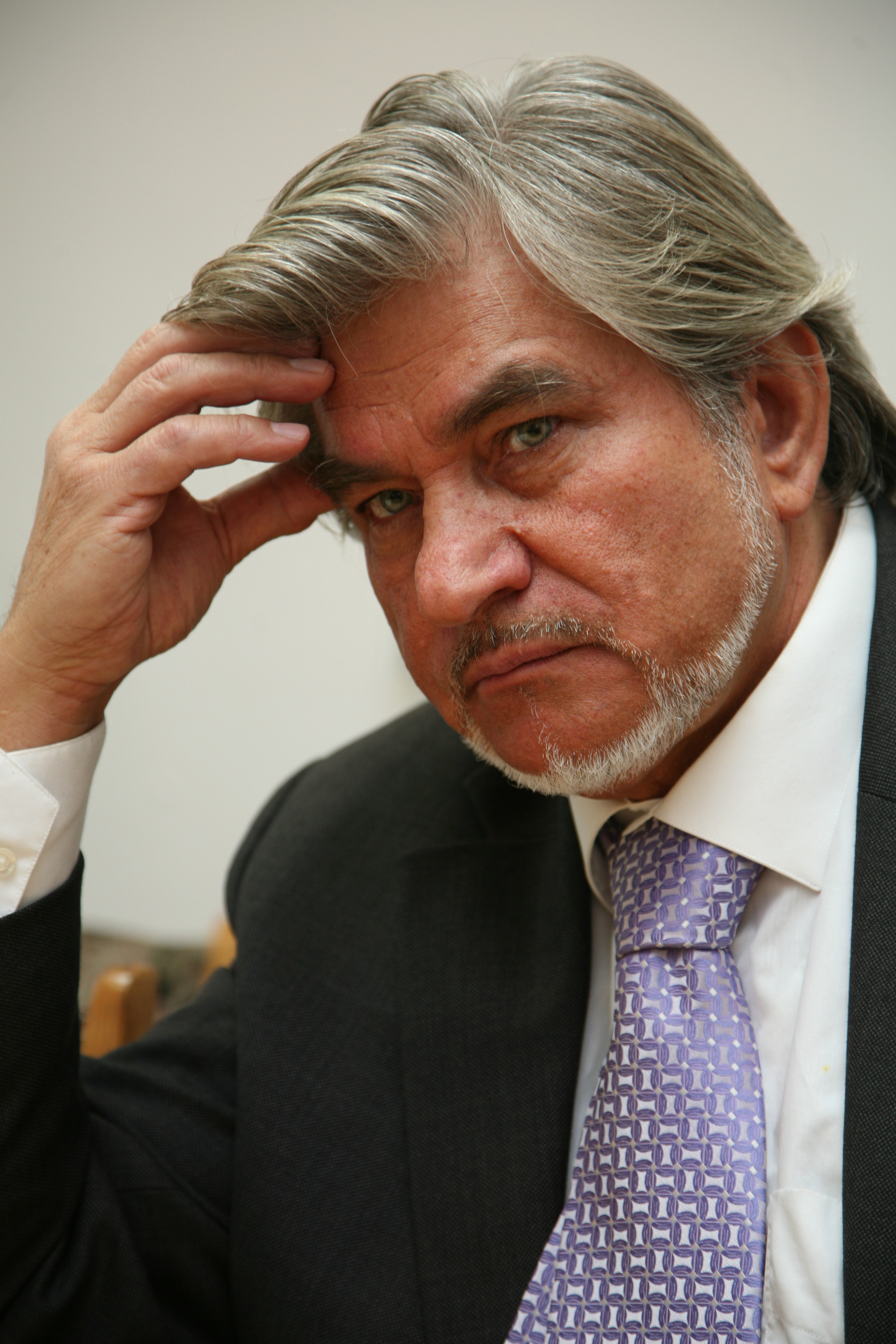
- Movchan in 2007

People's Deputy of Ukraine
- In office 23 November 2007 – 12 December 2012
- Constituency: Yulia Tymoshenko Bloc, No. 131
- In office 15 May 1990 – 25 May 2006
- Preceded by: Position established (1990); Stepan Pushyk (1994); Constituency established (1998)
- Succeeded by: Vacant (1994); Constituency abolished (1998, 2002)
- Constituency: Kyiv, Berezniaky (1990–1994); Ivano-Frankivsk Oblast, Kolomyia (1994–1998); Rivne Oblast, No. 152 (1998–2002); Our Ukraine Bloc, No. 58 (2002–2006)

Personal details
- Born: 13 July 1939 (age 87) Velyka Vilshanka, Ukrainian SSR, Soviet Union
- Party: Independent (since c. 2006)
- Other political affiliations: Our Ukraine Bloc (2002–2005); Ukrainian National Bloc of Kostenko and Plyushch (2006); Democratic Bloc (1990–1992); Congress of National Democratic Forces (1992–1994); People's Movement of Ukraine (1990–2000); Ukrainian People's Party (2000–c. 2006); Yulia Tymoshenko Bloc (2007–2010); Reforms for the Future (2011–2012)
- Education: Taras Shevchenko University of Kyiv; Maxim Gorky Literature Institute
- Writing career
- Language: Ukrainian
- Period: 1963–present
- Subjects: Existentialism, space, time, Christianity, mysticism
- Movement: Sixtiers

Pavlo Mykhailovych Movchan (Ukrainian: Павло Михайлович Мовчан; born 13 July 1939) is a Ukrainian poet and politician who served as a People's Deputy of Ukraine from 1990 to 2006 and from 2007 to 2012. Prior to taking office, Movchan was a poet who was associated with the Sixtiers and Soviet dissidents.

== Early life and education ==
Pavlo Mykhailovych Movchan was born 13 July 1939 in the village of Velyka Vilshanka, then part of the Soviet Union. Both of his parents were collective farmers. From 1958 to 1960 he studied at the Taras Shevchenko National University of Kyiv, later studying at the Maxim Gorky Literature Institute. From 1966 to 1967, Movchan worked as a fisherman; he later studied under the State Committee for Cinematography and worked as a screenwriter at Dovzhenko Film Studios. He was the head of a hydrometeorology research study conducted by the Academy of Sciences of the Soviet Union.

== Literary career ==
Movchan made his debut in 1963, releasing the collection Here! (Ukrainian: Нате!, romanized: Nate!). His literary style during this time was closely associated with the Sixtiers. During his early literary career Movchan was largely published in Russian-language magazines, and he lived primarily in Moscow. He later published his second anthology, Kora, in 1968. He reached the peak of his activity during the 1970s and 1980s, publishing nine separate anthologies between 1977 and 1989. Movchan's works are characterised by existentialism.

Movchan's poetry collections have been described by Ivan Dziuba as being typically divided into three different, contradictory motifs; Dziuba wrote circa 2019 that these motifs typically reflect Hegelian dialectics of thesis, antithesis and synthesis, both in terms of their subject matter and their poetic style. Typical themes addressed in Movchan's poetry include space, time and intimacy. Literary historian and poet Nadiia Havryliuk argues that Movchan's works primarily concern faith and mysticism, pointing out that Movchan frequently alludes to Biblical themes in his poetry.

Movchan was one of the awardees of the Shevchenko National Prize in 1992, and he was granted the title of Merited Artist of Ukraine the next year. He is the head of Prosvita, a society for the promotion of the Ukrainian language.

== Political career ==
During the Soviet era, Movchan supported Ukrainian Soviet dissidents. Following the 1972–1973 Ukrainian purge, he lived under constant surveillance from the KGB and was forced to live in internal exile.

Movchan was first elected to the Verkhovna Rada (Ukrainian parliament) in the 1990 Ukrainian Supreme Soviet election, representing Berezniaky in the city of Kyiv as part of the Democratic Bloc alliance. At the time of his election, he was a member of the People's Movement of Ukraine (Ukrainian: Народний рух України, romanized: Narodnyi rukh Ukrainy, abbreviated Rukh); he later joined the Congress of National Democratic Forces. He was chief of the subcommittee on the Chernobyl disaster.

Movchan was re-elected in the 1994 and 1998 elections, being elected from Kolomyia in Ivano-Frankivsk Oblast and Ukraine's 152nd electoral district in Rivne Oblast respectively. He was a member of the Foreign Affairs and CIS Relations Committee, being the committee's chairman from February 2000 to 2002 and serving as head of the inter-parliamentary relations subcommittee from 1994 to 1998. During the split in Rukh, he joined Yuriy Kostenko's supporters, becoming a member of the Ukrainian People's Party in April 2000. Movchan was elected on the proportional representation list of the Our Ukraine Bloc in the 2002 Ukrainian parliamentary election; he left the bloc for the Ukrainian People's Party Bloc in March 2005. From 2002 to 2006 he was first deputy chair of the Culture and Spirituality Committee.

Movchan was a candidate in the 2006 Ukrainian parliamentary election for the Ukrainian National Bloc of Kostenko and Plyushch. He was not successfully elected. In the 2007 Ukrainian parliamentary election he returned to the Verkhovna Rada, this time as part of the Yulia Tymoshenko Bloc. He was placed as the 131st candidate on the bloc's proportional representation list, and at the time of his election, he was an independent. Movchan was a member of the Culture and Spirituality Committee, and head of the subcommittee on Creative Activities, Art, Cultural Education and Language Policies from February 2008. He left the Yulia Tymoshenko Bloc in February 2010, later becoming a member of the Reforms for the Future faction in the Verkhovna Rada.
