= Kyrylo Studynsky =

Ukrainian academic and politician (1868–1941)

Kyrylo Studynsky, also known as Kyrylo Studynskyi (Ukrainian: Кири́ло Йо́сипович Студи́нський; 4 October 1868 – 1941), was a Ukrainian political and cultural figure from the late-19th to the mid-20th century. One of the principal figures within the Christian Social Movement in Ukraine, in 1939 Studynsky became head of the People's Assembly of Western Ukraine following the Soviet annexation of Western Ukraine, 1939–1940, and led the delegation to Moscow that formally requested the inclusion of Western Ukraine to the Soviet Union.

== Biography ==
Kyrylo Studynsky

Kyrylo Studynsky was born in Kypiachka (now in Ternopil Oblast), at the time a part of Austria-Hungary, into a prominent clerical family. His grandfather, the priest Stephan Kachala, was a historian and member of the Austrian parliament. Kyrylo Studynsky studied philosophy at the University of Lviv, and at the University of Vienna before switching to Philology at the latter institution. He then studied Slavonics at the University of Berlin, and in 1897 became a lecturer of the Ukrainian language at the Jagiellonian University in Kraków. A specialist in philology, from 1900 until 1918 he was a professor at the University of Lviv. He knew 6 ancient languages and 10 modern ones, and published over 500 academic works. In addition to such academic pursuits, Studynsky also published poetry and memoirs.

In 1911 Studynsky helped found the Christian Social Party and played an important role in organizing the educational system of the West Ukrainian National Republic. Following the annexation of Western Ukraine by Poland, along with many other Ukrainian professors, he was released from the University of Lviv by the Polish authorities. Studynsky subsequently became head of the Shevchenko Scientific Society. A close friend of Mykhailo Hrushevskyi, he made numerous visits to Kyiv and Kharkiv throughout the 1920s and was a member of the National Academy of Sciences of Ukraine in the Ukrainian SSR during the time of Ukrainization within the Ukrainian SSR. Due to his alleged pro-Soviet sympathies, in 1930 he was assaulted in his office at the Shevchenko Scientific Society by two members of the Organization of Ukrainian Nationalists. In 1932, Studynsky was among the first academics to protest against the Holodomor and was expelled from the National Academy of Sciences of Ukraine the following year.

== Final events and deaths ==
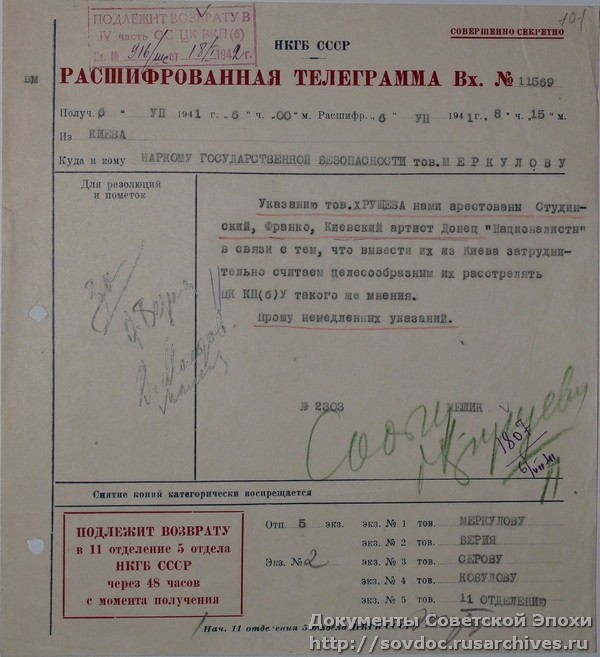
the NKVD encrypted telegram regarding the request for the shooting of Studynsky, Franko and Donets

When the Soviet Union annexed western Ukraine in 1939, Soviet-sponsored elections created a People's Assembly of Western Ukraine. Studynsky became its head, and he led the delegation to Moscow that requested the formal inclusion of Western Ukraine into the Ukrainian Soviet Socialist Republic. Following western Ukraine's incorporation into the USSR, Studynsky was reinstated in the Academy of Sciences, became a member of the Supreme Soviet of the Ukrainian SSR and became head of the Philology department at the University of Lviv. According to archived personal documents, he had no illusions about the repressive nature of Soviet power, but sought compromise with the authorities in order to moderate their activities. During this time he did all he could to protect others from Soviet repression. Through his personal interventions, ten wives of executed academics were spared the death penalty, and the widow and sister of Mykhailo Hrushevskyi were not denied their pensions. In June 1941, when the USSR was invaded by Germany, he was forcibly evacuated from Lviv by the Soviets and died under mysterious circumstances.

== See also ==
- List of unsolved deaths

== Sources ==
- Encyclopedia of Ukraine, ed. Volodymyr Kubiyovych. New York.

Academic offices
Preceded by Vasyl Shchurat	President of Shevchenko Scientific Society; 1923–1934	Succeeded by Volodymyr Levytsky
