= Anatole Vakhnianyn =

Ukrainian politician, composer, and journalist (1841–1908)

- Анатоль Вахнянин
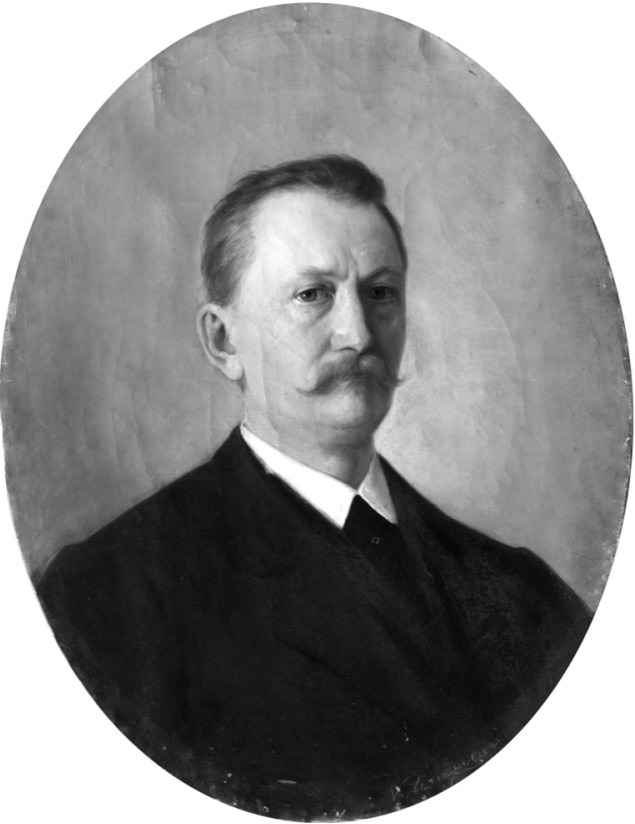
- A 1887 portrait of Vakhnianyn by Kornylo Ustiyanovych
- Born: 19 September 1841; Sieniawa, Kingdom of Galicia and Lodomeria, Austria-Hungary
- Died: 11 February 1908 (aged 66); Lviv, Austria-Hungary
- Resting place: Lychakiv Cemetery
- Education: University of Vienna
- Occupations: Composer, politician, writer

Anatole Vakhnianyn (Ukrainian: Анатоль Вахнянин; 19 September 1841 – 11 February 1908), was a Ukrainian composer, political and cultural figure, teacher, and journalist.

== Biography ==
=== Family ===
Vakhnianyn was born in Sieniawa, Przeworsk County, today a part of Poland but at that time a part of the Austrian Empire. He came from a clerical family of noble origins. His father, Klym Vakhnianyn, and grandfather, Iakiv Vakhnyanin, were both Greek-Catholic priests. His mother, Karolina Veith, was the daughter of a Czech-German officer stationed at the Przemysl garrison.

== Life ==
In 1859, after the completion of his studies at the gymnasium in Przemyśl, Vakhnianyn began studying theology in the theological seminary in Lviv. During this time, he came to recognize the deeper "beauty of Ukrainian poetry and prose", and became heavily involved in Ukrainian literature and music. In 1863, he married Jozefa de Wankowicz, a distant cousin and member of the Lis noble family. In 1865, Vakhnianyn organized the first Shevchenko concert in western Ukrainian lands, in Przemyśl. In 1865, he began a course in philosophy at the University of Vienna. He organized the first Ukrainian student organization at the university (Sich) and became its first head.

Vakhnianyn returned to Lviv in 1868 and helped to organize the Prosvita Society, an organization dedicated to educational and cultural work among the Ukrainian people that helped lead to a national awakening among them, becoming its first head. He was also heavily involved in the creation of Ukrainian-language textbooks in the Austrian school system.

Between 1867 and 1870, Vakhnianyn edited the journal Pravda. In 1870, he was a coeditor of the journal Dilo, the main journal of the Ukrainophile movement in western Ukraine, and from 1870 to 1878 he edited Prosvita's journal.

In 1890, he helped initiate the "New Era" movement, dedicated to forging a rapprochement between Poles and Ukrainians in east Galicia. After most of the other Ukrainophiles broke with the Poles in 1894, Vakhnianyn continued to seek compromise with them, and along with Oleksander Barvinsky was one of the founders of the "Catholic Ruthenian-Social Union", based on the all-Austrian Christian social movement.

Between 1894 and 1900, Vakhnianyn was a member of the Galician Diet and the Austrian parliament. In 1903, he founded the Higher Musical Institute in Lviv, currently the Lviv Conservatory, and became its first director. Under the pen-name Natal Vakhnianyn, he composed the opera Kupala (written between 1870 and 1892, premiered at the Kharkiv Opera House in 1929), music to Taras Shevchenko's drama Nazar Stodolia, and various literary works. He also wrote four novels and translated works by Nikolai Gogol and Ivan Turgenev.

Vakhnianyn died on 11 February 1908 and was buried in the Lychakivskiy Cemetery in Lviv. Those eulogizing him after his death included the Ukrainian poet Ivan Franko and the Ukrainian composer Mykola Lysenko.

== Sources ==
- Dytyniak Maria Ukrainian Composers - A Bio-bibliographic Guide - Research report No. 14, 1896, Canadian Institute of Ukrainian Studies, University of Alberta, Canada.
- In Ukrainian: Батенко Т. Анатоль Вахнянин: біля джерел національного відродження" (Львів, 1998).
- Batenko, T. (1998). Anatole Vakhnianyn: Among the Wells of National Rebirth, Lviv.
- Kachmar, Volodymyra (2009). Narysy Istorii Nashoho Rodu. Lviv.
