= Christian Social Movement in Ukraine =

19th–20th-century political movement in western Ukraine

The Christian Social Movement in Ukraine was a political movement that existed in Western Ukraine from the end of the 19th century until the 1930s.

== Ideals ==
The movement's program was based on Christian ethics and on papal encyclicals focused on social concerns whilst its political orientation was clerical-conservative. The movement's leaders included the Ukrainian political and cultural figure Oleksander Barvinsky, Anatole Vakhnianyn, and Kyrylo Studynsky. The Christian Social Movement's support was based on Ukrainian moderates seeking rapprochement between Ukrainians and Poles. Originally its principles included loyalty to Austria-Hungary and the Habsburg monarchy, the creation of a separate Ukrainian province, support for the Ukrainian language and expansion of Ukrainian schools, and opposition to Galician Russophiles.

== History ==
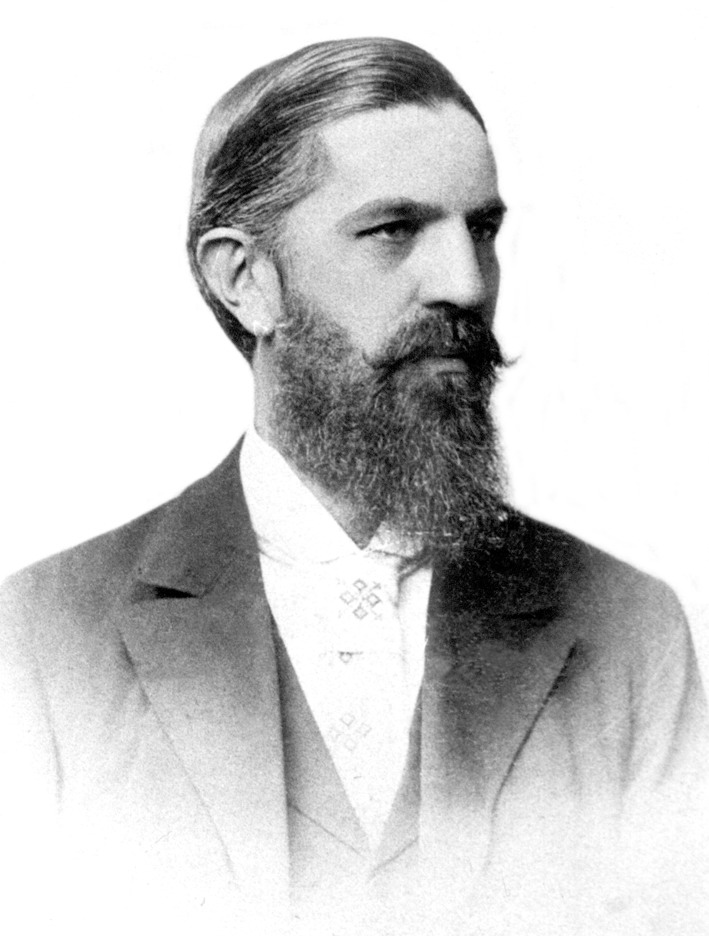
Oleksander Barvinsky, founder of the Christian Social Party

Its political party, founded in 1896, was originally named the Catholic Ruthenian People's Union. During this time, it was supported by Metropolitan Sembratovych, head of the Ukrainian Greek Catholic Church, and by the Austrian government, which subsidized the newspaper Ruslan. In 1911 the Catholic Ruthenian People's Union, under the leadership of Oleksander Barvinky, renamed itself as the Christian Social Party and sent representatives to the Austrian Parliament in Vienna as well as to the local Galician Diet. The Christian Social Party was more popular among Ukrainian civil servants than it was among the clergy, was uncritically loyal to the Habsburg monarchy, and did not enjoy widespread popularity among the Ukrainian population.

After Austria-Hungary's collapse, the Christian Social Party subsequently participated in the formation of the West Ukrainian People's Republic. Following the Polish–Ukrainian War, after western Ukraine had passed under the control of the Second Polish Republic, the party continued to function until the 1930s. At that time, part of its members joined the Ukrainian National Democratic Alliance (UNDO), a moderate political organization opposed to the radical Organization of Ukrainian Nationalists, while others founded the Ukrainian Catholic People's Party (also known as the Ukrainian People's Renewal, UKNP/UNO). The latter party supported autonomy for western Ukraine but was loyal to the Polish state. Advocating to "act as an intermediary between West and East", the People's Renewal was able to place a member in the Polish parliament and Senate but was generally not very influential within Ukrainian society.

In the Second World War, western Ukraine was annexed by the Soviet Union and the Christian Social Movement ceased to exist there.

Due to its strong ties to the Ukrainian Greek Catholic Church, the Christian Social Movement was criticized for its clericalism by both left-wing socialist groups as well as by right-wing nationalist groups in western Ukraine.

== See also ==
- Political Catholicism
