= Prosvita =

Ukrainian cultural and educational organization

All-Ukrainian Prosvita Society named after Taras Shevchenko
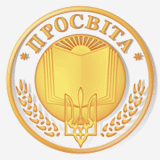
- Formation: 1868
- Headquarters: Kyiv, Ukraine
- Chairman: Pavlo Movchan
- Website: http://prosvitanews.org.ua/

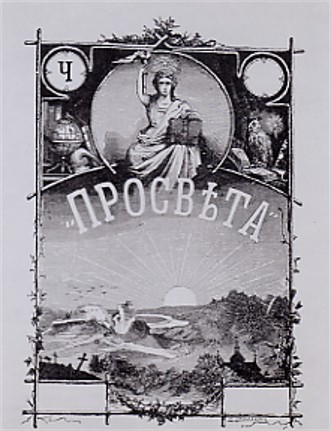
Early publication cover

Prosvita (Ukrainian: Просвіта, lit. 'enlightenment'), since 1991 officially titled All-Ukrainian Prosvita Society named after Taras Shevchenko (Всеукраїнське товариство «Просвіта» імені Тараса Шевченка) is an enlightenment society aimed to preserve and develop Ukrainian culture, education and science, that was created in the nineteenth century in Austria-Hungary's Kingdom of Galicia and Lodomeria.

According to the declaration of its founders, the movement was created as a counterbalance to Russophile trends in the Ukrainian society of the period.

== History ==
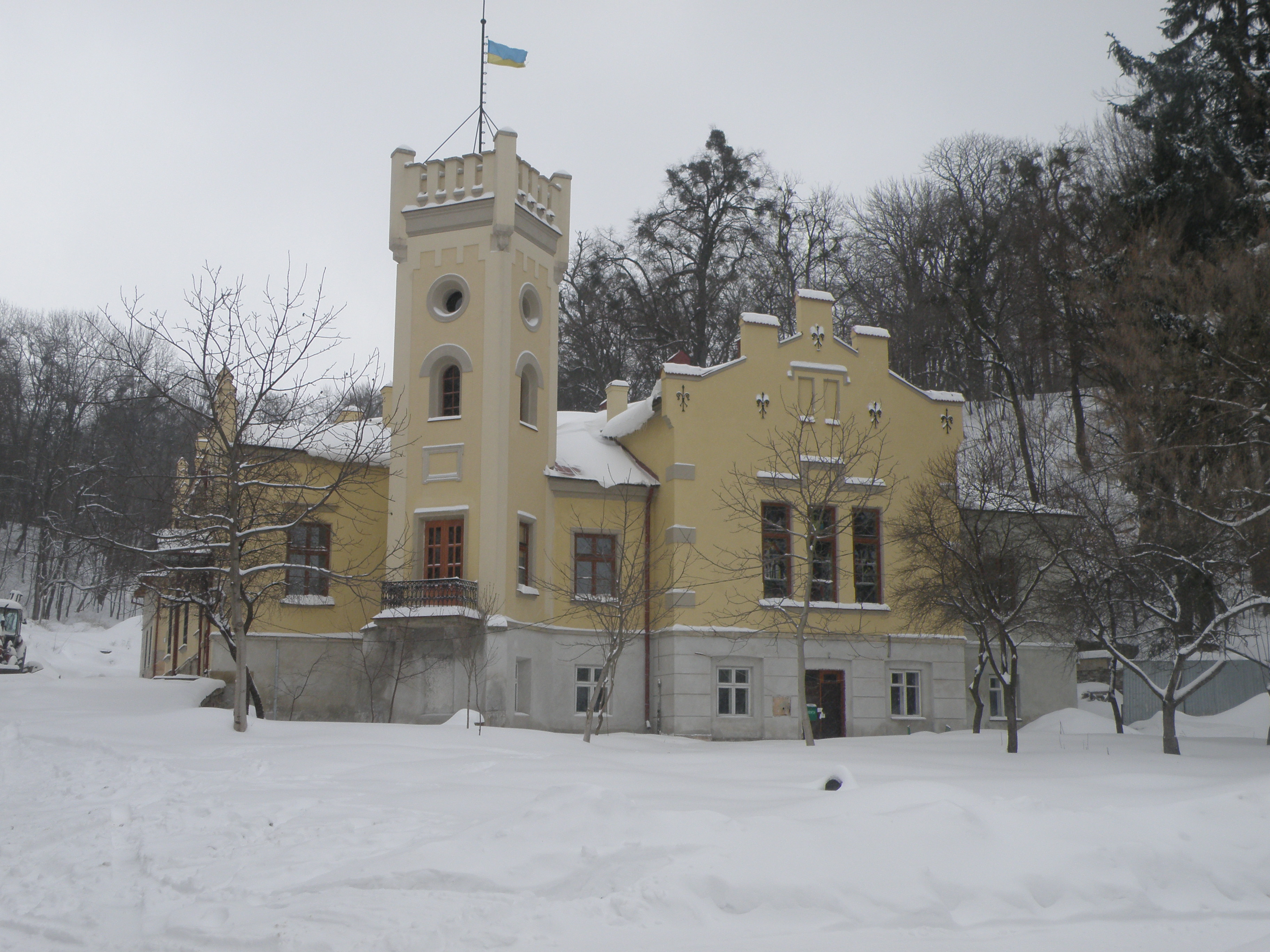
Building where the society was established

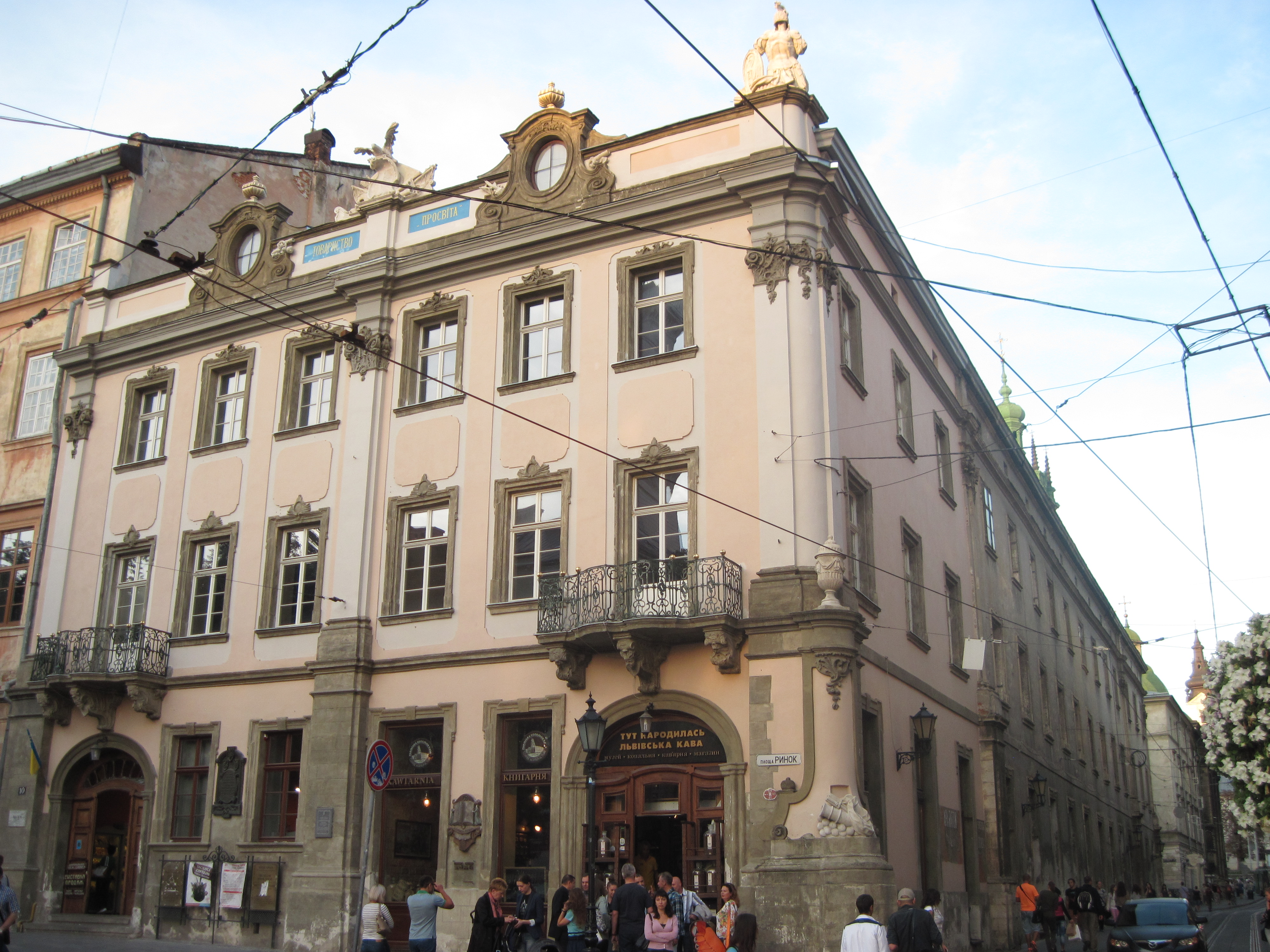
The Prosvita Society was headquartered at Lubomirski Palace, Lviv

Prosvita was founded in 1868 in Lviv by 65 delegates from different regions and groups of intellectuals, mostly from the same city. Anatole Vakhnianyn was elected the first head of the Prosvita Society. By the end of 1913, Prosvita had 77 affiliate societies and 2,648 reading rooms. It also operated in the Duchy of Bukovina, falsely claiming that the Ukrainians are the majority ethnic group of the region and that the Romanians are an aggressive, chauvinistic minority.

After the First Russian Revolution (1905), local branches of the society were also opened in the Russian-ruled areas populated by Ukrainians: in Katerynoslav and Odesa (1905), Kyiv (1906), Kamianets-Podilskyi, Zhytomyr, Chernihiv, Mykolaiv, Melitopol, Katerynodar, and other cities. However, all of Prosvita societies in the Russian Empire were closed before the start of World War I, as they were accused of promoting separatism by imperial authorities.

A new wave of Prosvita's development started after the Russian Revolution of 1917, when its branches were restored in Dnieper Ukraine, Volhynia, and Polissia, as well as in Kuban and the Far East. However, most of them were once again closed down by the Soviet and Polish authorities in the 1920s and 1930s. Similarly, the Zakarpattian branch of Prosvita established in 1920 was closed down by the Hungarian government in 1939.

After the end of World War I, Prosvita continued to develop in Galicia. In 1936 alone, when Western Ukraine with the city of Lviv were part of the Second Polish Republic, the society opened over 500 new outlets with full-time professional staff. By the end of the interwar period, Prosvita had grown to include 83 affiliates, 3,210 reading rooms, 1,207 premises, 3,209 libraries (with 688,186 books), 2,185 theater clubs, 1,115 choirs, 138 orchestras, and 550 study groups.

In 1939 the society was shut down and banned by the newly arrived Soviet rulers. Prosvita operated only in Western Europe and America up to 1988. The first Prosvita society established in the United States was in Shenandoah, Pennsylvania in 1887.

The Prosvita Society was renewed in Ukraine during the Soviet period of Glasnost of 1988–1989 as the Shevchenko Association of Ukrainian Language, and since then has taken an active part in social life of independent Ukraine. In modern times, it was headed by Dmytro Pavlychko and Pavlo Movchan (present head).

Currently, almost all higher education institutions in Ukraine have Prosvita affiliations with teachers and students as members. Also active are the Young Prosvita youth organizations.

During the Russian takeover of the Donbas in 2014, several Prosvita members were targeted by pro-Russian separatists. In Luhansk, the Army of the Southeast detained a historian and university professor who was the head of Prosvita in the city in June 2014. Several days later he died in captivity. The month prior, separatist militants robbed the house of a Prosvita member in Druzhkivka and murdered a member of the Krasnyi Lyman Prosvita in the village of Shandryholove.

== Tasks ==
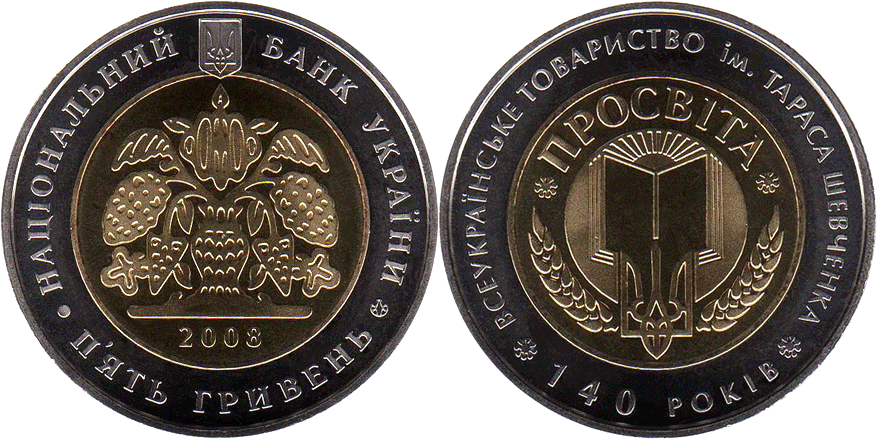
The commemorative coin "140 Years of Taras Shevchenko All-Ukrainian “Prosvita" Society"

Official goals of the Prosvita Society:

- Promoting Ukrainian language as the only state language in Ukraine
- Maintaining principles of humanity, mutual understanding, religious and civil consent in society
- Contributing to building and strengthening of Ukrainian state and its economic development
- Propagating economic, legal and other kind of knowledge
- Contributing to raising of Ukrainian language and culture authority abroad
- Preserving and revitalizing natural environment and biodiversity

== Leaders ==
=== Kingdom of Galicia and Lodomeria ===
- 1868–???? Anatole Vakhnianyn
- 1906–1906 Yevhen Olesnytsky
- 1906–1910 Petro Ohonovsky
- 1910–1922 Ivan Kyvelyuk

=== Russian Empire ===
==== Kyiv Governorate ====
- 1906-1909 Borys Hrinchenko

==== Chernigov Governorate ====
- 1906–1911 Mykhailo Kotsyubynsky

==== Kharkov Governorate ====
- 1912–???? (as Kvitka-Osnovianenko Association)

==== Odesa (Kherson Governorate) ====
- Mykhailo Komarov

==== Yekaterinoslav Governorate ====
- 1905–???? (as Ukrainian Association of Literature and Arts)
- 1910-???? Maria Khrinnykova

==== Podolia Governorate ====
- ?

==== Don Host Oblast ====
- 1907–1913 Zakhar Barabash

=== Poland ===
- 1922–1923 Ivan Bryk
- 1923–1931 Mykhailo Halushchynskyi
- 1931–1939 Ivan Bryk

=== Romania ===
==== Akkerman (Bilhorod-Dnistrovskyi) ====
- 1936–1940 Ilko Havryliuk

=== Ukraine ===
- 1988–1989 Roman Ivanychuk (as Shevchenko Native Language Society)
- 1989–1990 Dmytro Pavlychko (as Shevchenko Association of Ukrainian Language)
- 1990–present Pavlo Movchan (originally as Shevchenko Association of Ukrainian Language and since 1991 – Prosvita)

== See also ==
- Shevchenko Scientific Society
- Hromada (secret society)
- Prosvjeta
