= Ukrainian nationalism =

Nationalism in support of the collective identity of Ukraine

Flag of Ukraine

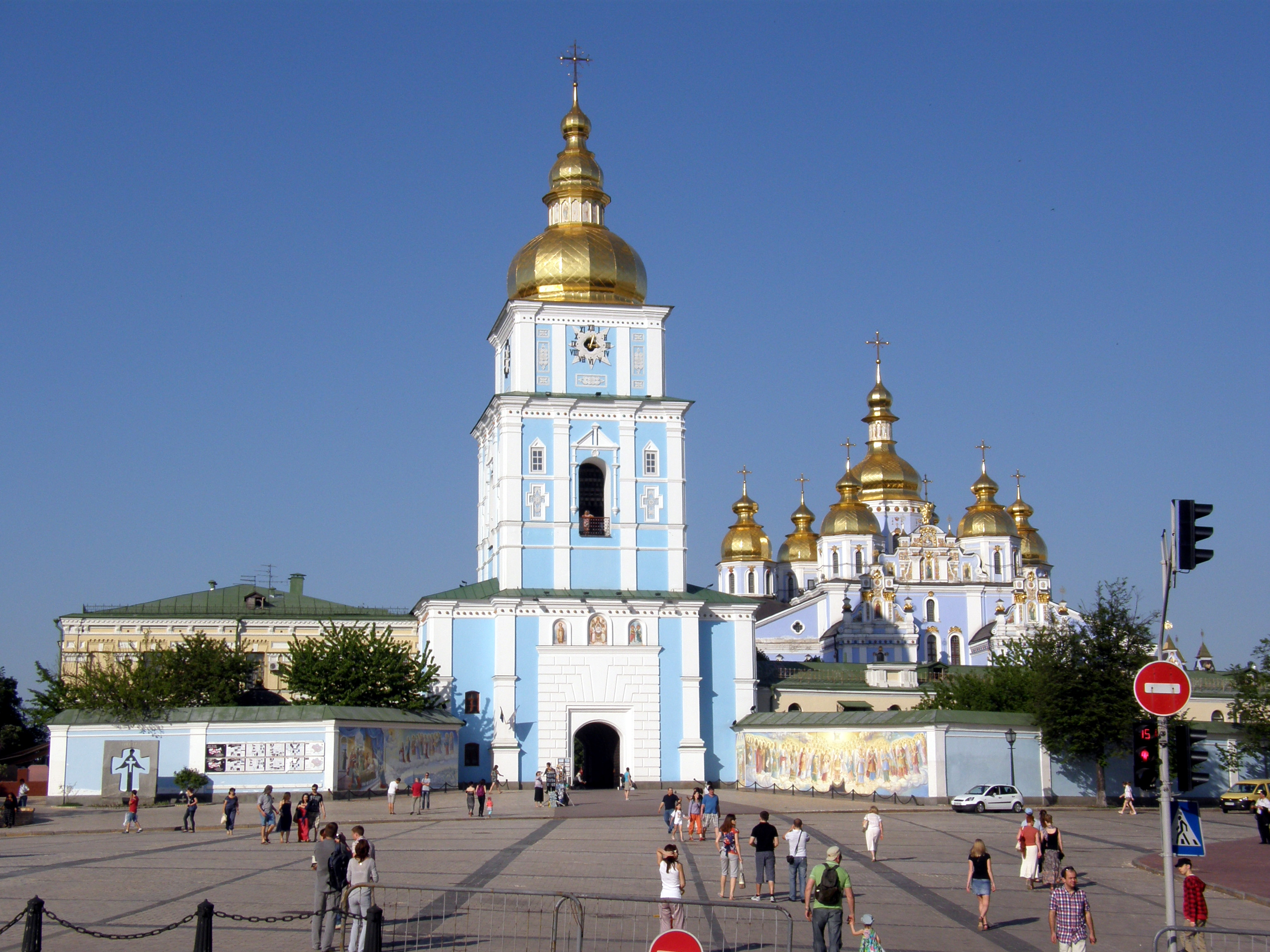
St. Michael's Golden-Domed Monastery in Kyiv, reconstructed after Ukrainian independence

Ukrainian nationalism (Ukrainian: Український націоналізм, romanized: Ukrayinskyi natsionalizm, pronounced [ʊkrɐˈjinʲsʲkɪj nɐts⁽ʲ⁾ionɐˈl⁽ʲ⁾izm]) is the promotion of the unity of Ukrainians as a people and the promotion of the Ukrainian state. The origins of modern Ukrainian nationalism emerge during the Cossack uprising against the Polish–Lithuanian Commonwealth led by Bohdan Khmelnytsky in the mid-17th century. Ukrainian nationalism draws upon a single national identity of culture, language, ethnicity, geographic location, politics (or the government), religion, traditions, and belief in a shared singular history.

== History ==
=== Zaporozhian Cossacks ===
The Cossacks played a strong role in solidifying Ukrainian identity during the Polish–Lithuanian Commonwealth. The Zaporozhian Cossacks lived on the Pontic–Caspian steppe below the Dnieper Rapids (Ukrainian: za porohamy), also known as the Wild Fields. They have played an important role in European geopolitics, participating in a series of conflicts and alliances with the Polish–Lithuanian Commonwealth, Russia, and the Ottoman Empire.

The Cossacks emerged as protectors against Tatar raids but were given greater rights as their influence grew. Cossacks revolted as the Polish Kings tried to enforce Catholicism and Polish language on the people of Ukraine. Precursors to the Ukrainian state emerged as Bohdan Khmelnytsky (c. 1595–1657), commanded the Zaporozhian Cossacks and led the Khmelnytsky Uprising against Polish rule in the mid-17th century. Khmelnytsky introduced a government based on a form of democracy which had been practised by Cossacks since the 15th century.

After a conflict between Ottoman-Polish and Polish-Muscovite Principalities, the official Cossack register decreased. This, together with intensified socioeconomic and national-religious oppression of the other classes in Ukrainian society, led to a number of Cossack uprisings in the 1630s. These eventually culminated in the Khmelnytsky Uprising, led by the hetman of the Zaporizhian Sich, Bohdan Khmelnytsky.

=== Cossack Hetmanate ===
As a result of the mid-17th century Khmelnytsky Uprising, the Zaporozhian Cossacks briefly established an independent state, which later became the autonomous Cossack Hetmanate (1649–1764). It was placed under the suzerainty of the Russian Tsar from 1667, but was ruled by local hetmans for a century. The principal political problem of the hetmans who followed the Pereyeslav Agreement was defending the autonomy of the Hetmanate from Russian/Muscovite centralism. The hetmans Ivan Vyhovsky, Petro Doroshenko and Ivan Mazepa attempted to resolve this by separating Ukraine from Russia.These conflicts created the conditions for Ukrainian nationalism as Bohdan Khmelnytsky spoke of the liberation of the "entire Ruthenian people". Following the uprisings and establishment of the Hetmanate state, Hetman Ivan Mazepa (1639–1709) focused on the restoration of Ukrainian culture and history during the early 18th century. Public works included the Saint Sophia Cathedral in Kyiv, and the elevation of the Kyiv Mohyla Collegium to the status of Kyiv Mohyla Academy in 1694.

During the reign of Catherine II of Russia, the Cossack Hetmanate's autonomy was progressively destroyed. After several earlier attempts, the office of hetman was finally abolished by the Russian government in 1764, and his functions were assumed by the Little Russian Collegium, thus fully incorporating the Hetmanate into the Russian Empire.

On 7 May 1775, Empress Catherine II issued a direct order that the Zaporozhian Sich was to be destroyed. On 5 June 1775, Russian artillery and infantry surrounded the Sich and razed it to the ground. The Russian troops disarmed the Cossacks, and the treasury archives were confiscated. The Koshovyi Otaman, Petro Kalnyshevsky, was arrested and incarcerated in exile at Solovetsky Monastery. This marked the end of the Zaporozhian Cossacks.

=== Russian and Habsburg Empires ===
An intense period of Russification began for the areas of the Hetmanate. After 1785 the Romanov dynasty made a conscious effort to assimilate the Ruthenian and Cossack elites by granting them noble status within the Russian Empire. This led to a decline of the Ukrainian language among ruling elite. Ukrainian language and culture was preserved through folk stories and songs. After the three partitions of the Polish–Lithuanian Commonwealth, the regions of Galicia (Halychyna) and Bukovina became part of the Habsburg Empire. Ukrainians living within the Austrian state did not face the same cultural repression and were influenced by the nationalism that spread after the French Revolution and the American Revolution.

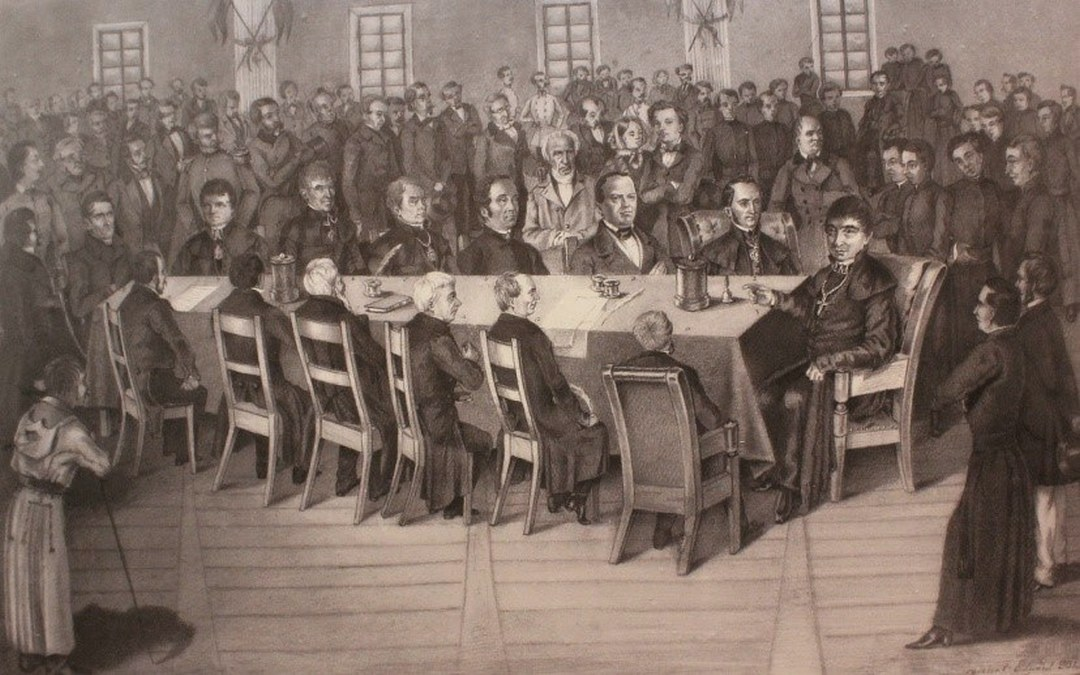
First session of the Supreme Ruthenian council in Lemberg

After the Revolutions of 1848 in the Austrian Empire, the Ruthenian Council tried to establish a Ukrainian nation but this effort was thwarted. National identities developed among Belarusians, Ukrainians, and Carpatho-Rusyns.

==== Ukrainophilism ====
The Ukrainophilism movement developed in the Russian Empire from the 1860s–1880s, named as such after Ukrainian activists who self-identified as Ukrainophiles (ukrainofily or ukrainoliubtsi). Clandestine societies called hromadas began to be set up in the late 1850s by the Ukrainian intelligentsia in Tsarist Russia. They had the aim of promoting national consciousness through self-education and exhibited a shared emphasis on promoting the Ukrainian language and reading Ukrainian literature, especially the works of Taras Shevchenko.

Because of police persecution and the transience of their members, most hromadas only existed for a few years. The term acquired a negative connotation in the 1890s and 1900s when it began to be used by the next generation of nationalist thinkers, such as Borys Hrinchenko and Mykola Mikhnovsky, to describe Ukrainians whose national consciousness had not developed past an ethnographic appreciation.

==== West Ukrainian populism ====
West Ukrainian populism emerged in the 1860s among the younger generation of the Ukrainian intelligentsia (commonly known as narodovtsi or populists) in Austrian Galicia as a reaction to the increasingly disillusioned and clerical older generation that had begun to orient itself towards Russophilism. Contacts with Ukrainophiles in the Russian Empire strongly influenced the emergence of the movement, whereafter they organised hromadas.

Prosvita societies began to be set up in the late 1860s with the aim of educating communities and developing Ukrainians' national consciousness. The populist movement later lost its socially radical elements and became more clerically conservative as its proponents aged and began to cooperate with clerics who had broken with the Russophiles. In response, a new radical populist movement emerged based on the thought of Mykhailo Drahomanov that included Ivan Franko and which founded the Ukrainian Radical Party in 1890. By the 1900s, Ukrainian activists in the Austro-Hungarian and Russian empires came to view Galicia as a "Ukrainian Piedmont" with favourable political and cultural conditions from which an independent Ukrainian state could grow, drawing a parallel to the development of Italian nationalism.

==== USDRP ====
In 1905, the Ukrainian Social Democratic Labour Party (USDRP) emerged out of a split in the Revolutionary Ukrainian Party. Operating clandestinely in Tsarist Russia, the USDRP was made up of nationally-conscious Ukrainian socialists, most of whom favoured national autonomy in federation with Russia over the outright independence that had been advocated by nationalists such as Mikhnovsky and Franko. Among its founding members were Mykola Porsh, Dmytro Antonovych, Volodymyr Vynnychenko, Luka Bych, Andriy Livytskyi, Dmytro Dontsov, Borys Martos, Isaak Mazepa, and Symon Petliura. In 1913, Dontsov delivered a controversial speech centred on complete separatism from Russia and an alignment with Mitteleuropa as an Austro-Hungarian protectorate, leading him to break with the USDRP.

=== First World War and Ukrainian War of Independence ===
At the outbreak of the First World War in 1914, socialist Ukrainian exiles from the Russian Empire established the Union for the Liberation of Ukraine (SVU), which engaged in propaganda as well as Prosvita education among Ukrainian POWs from the Russian army. (Note: After the February Revolution, the SVU formed two armed divisions from Ukrainian POWs under the German and Austro-Hungarian armies respectively that were later incorporated into the Ukrainian People's Army (UPA).) In the aftermath of the 1917 February Revolution and the abdication of Nicholas II, Ukrainian activists established the Central Rada, with the influential historian Mykhailo Hrushevsky selected as its chairman. Under the Central Rada, Prosvita societies emerged and in April an estimated 100,000 people marched in Kyiv with blue-and-yellow flags in support of Ukrainian autonomy. Functioning as a de facto revolutionary parliament, the Central Rada promoted a nationalist message with slogans of land reform and universal peace and established a cabinet of ministers headed by Vynnychenko. The Central Rada unilaterally declared its autonomy in June after its demands were rejected by the Russian Provisional Government. Following the Bolshevik Revolution in November, it proclaimed the creation of the Ukrainian People's Republic (UPR) in federation with Russia, though it declared its independence on 22 January 1918 amid the onset of the Ukrainian–Soviet War and negotiations with the Central Powers.

In the midst of the Bolshevik capture of Kyiv in February, the UPR signed the Bread Peace with the Central Powers that recognised the authority of the Central Rada in return for grain deliveries, while the Treaty of Brest-Litovsk in March forced Soviet Russia to recognise the UPR. Dissatisfied with disruption caused by the Central Rada's socialist agrarian reforms, the German military administration took control of grain collection and backed a coup d'état in April that established the Ukrainian State under Hetman Pavlo Skoropadsky. Skoropadsky was supported by Vyacheslav Lypynsky, the leading theorist of Ukrainian conservatism and a pro-independence monarchist. Skoropadsky introduced and promoted civic and territorial nationalism rather than its cultural and ethnic counterparts, though his cabinet was markedly Russophile and Russophone and contemporary Ukrainian activists viewed him and his officials, at best, as Little Russians.

==== Resumption of hostilities ====
Political opposition to Skoropadsky materialized in the form of the Ukrainian National Union, led by Vynnychenko, which began to prepare a rebellion. With the capitulation of the Central Powers in November and the impending troop withdrawal, Skoropadsky pandered to the Allies and issued a manifesto proclaiming a federation with a future non-Bolshevik Russia. This incited the Anti-Hetman Uprising led by the Directorate under two rival members of the USDRP, the ultra-socialist Vynnychenko and the more nationalistic Petliura, and supported by the Sich Riflemen. The Directorate's forces entered Kyiv in December and re-established the UPR, while Skoropadsky's Hetmanite movement went into exile. The Directorate engaged in nation-building, establishing Ukrainian as the official language of the UPR and proclaiming the independence of the Orthodox Church of Ukraine. Initially Chairman of the Directorate, Vynnychenko resigned after the fall of Kyiv in February 1919 and was replaced by Petliura. Directorate troops committed 40% of the recorded anti-Jewish pogroms during the Russian Civil War, leading to Petliura being branded in the West as a violent antisemite.

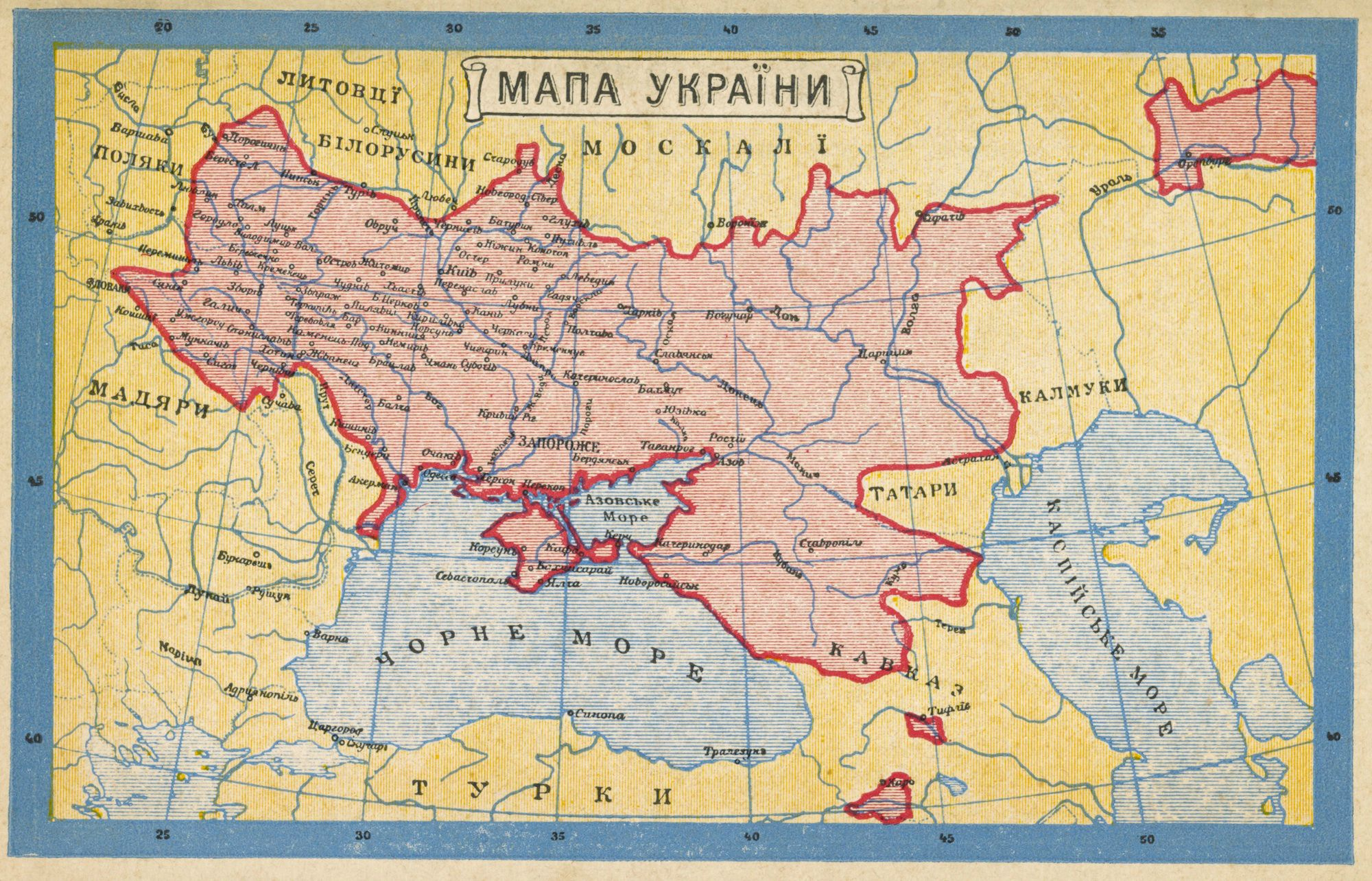
Territory that was claimed by Ukraine according to a postcard from 1919

The Ukrainian National Council was established in Lviv in October 1918 and, amidst the dissolution of the Austro-Hungarian Empire, declared the establishment of an independent Ukrainian state in November, forming the West Ukrainian People's Republic (ZUNR) under the national democrat Yevhen Petrushevych. Conflict broke out with Poland over control of eastern Galicia and, on 22 January 1919, the ZUNR unified with the UPR. Ukrainian forces lost eastern Galicia to the Poles and the Ukrainian Galician Army retreated eastwards to join the Directorate's forces on what little territory it still controlled.

After the Directorate declared war on the Whites in September, Ukrainian troops were decimated by an October typhus epidemic. Petliura entered into negotiations with Poland, while the Ukrainian Galician Army subordinated itself to Anton Denikin. Petliura agreed to cede western Ukraine to Poland and to launch a joint offensive against the Bolsheviks in April 1920. However, following a Red Army counteroffensive, the Poles signed the Treaty of Riga in March 1921 that divided Ukraine between Poland and the Ukrainian Soviet Republic. Northern Bukovina was occupied by Romania in 1918, while Transcarpathia was absorbed into the new state of Czechoslovakia. The remnants of Petliura's forces were interned in Poland and the UPR subsequently went into exile. In 1920, officers of the Sich Riflemen and Ukrainian Galician Army formed the Ukrainian Military Organization (UVO) to continue the armed struggle against Poland in western Ukraine, with Yevhen Konovalets appointed to lead the UVO in 1921.

In 1918, the Borotbists split off from the Ukrainian Socialist-Revolutionary Party and collaborated with the Bolsheviks, though insisted on wide-ranging Ukrainian autonomy. They founded a Ukrainian Communist Party in 1919 and demanded admission to the Communist International as an independent national-communist party. The Borotbists had a strong peasant following and in 1920 accepted a compromise with Vladimir Lenin that saw them merge with the Bolsheviks in return for a separate Ukrainian republic. Among its leaders were Oleksander Shumsky, Vasyl Ellan-Blakytny, Mykhailo Poloz, Panas Liubchenko, Hryhoriy Hrynko, and Oleksander Dovzhenko.

=== Interwar period in Soviet Ukraine ===
As Bolshevik rule took hold in Ukraine, the early Soviet government had its own reasons to encourage the national movements of the former Russian Empire. Until the early 1930s, Ukrainian culture enjoyed a widespread revival due to Bolshevik concessions known as the policy of Korenization ("indigenization"). In these years an impressive Ukrainization program was implemented throughout the republic. In such conditions, the Ukrainian national idea initially continued to develop and even spread to a large territory with traditionally mixed population in the east and south that became part of the Ukrainian Soviet Socialist Republic. At the same time, despite the ongoing Soviet-wide anti-religious campaign, the Ukrainian national Orthodox Church was created, the Ukrainian Autocephalous Orthodox Church. The church was initially seen by the Bolshevik government as a tool in their goal to suppress the Russian Orthodox Church, always viewed with great suspicion by the regime for its being the cornerstone of the defunct Russian Empire and the initially strong opposition it took towards the regime change. Therefore, the government tolerated the new Ukrainian national church for some time and the UAOC gained a wide following among the Ukrainian peasantry.

These events greatly raised the national consciousness of the Ukrainians, and brought about the development of a new generation of Ukrainian cultural and political elite. This in turn raised the concerns of Soviet dictator Joseph Stalin, who saw danger in the Ukrainians' loyalty towards their nation competing with their loyalty to the Soviet State, and in the early 1930s "Ukrainian bourgeois nationalism" was declared to be the primary problem in Ukraine. The Ukrainization policies were abruptly and bloodily reversed, most of the Ukrainian cultural and political elite was arrested and executed, and the nation was decimated with the famine called the Holodomor.

=== Interwar period in the West ===
In the 1920s, a radical wing of the Ukrainian nationalist movement (Note: In his book The Turn to the Right, Alexander J. Motyl terms this "Ukrainian Nationalism". Contemporary scholars have referred to it as "radical Ukrainian nationalism".) emerged that rejected the prewar nationalism that had reconciled Ukrainian national aspirations with democratic and humanist values. Radical Ukrainian nationalists blamed democracy, socialism, and a lack of will for the failure of the independence war. Dontsov fundamentally influenced the emergence of the movement and developed his own brand of radical Ukrainian nationalism.

Pro-Soviet sentiment was initially widespread in western Ukraine during the 1920s due to the success of Ukrainization, with the pro-Soviet left advocating unification with Soviet Ukraine. However, pro-Soviet sentiment all but disappeared in western Ukraine by the mid-1930s with the end of Ukrainization and the Holodomor. Ukrainians in Bukovina and Bessarabia were meanwhile subjected to a strict policy of assimilation by the Romanian government. Czechoslovakia became the only state outside the USSR that supported the use of the Ukrainian language in local administrations in Transcarpathia, though promises of regional autonomy went unfulfilled. During the Sudeten crisis, the Czech authorities allowed the creation of a regional administration under the Ukrainophile priest Avgustyn Voloshyn. Voloshyn's government renamed the autonomous region Carpatho-Ukraine and declared its independence in March 1939 after Nazi Germany agreed to allow Hungary to invade and occupy the region, which it did shortly after.

==== UNDO ====
In 1923, the Conference of Ambassadors ruled in favor of Polish sovereignty over western Ukraine. Several smaller parties merged in 1925 to form the moderate liberal Ukrainian National Democratic Alliance (UNDO), chaired by Dmytro Levytsky. The UNDO was supported by Metropolitan Andrey Sheptytsky and served as the main Galician Ukrainian party of the interwar period. Its founding convention called for the establishment of a unified Ukrainian state and demanded Ukrainians' right to self-determination. It rejected international decisions and initially supported Petrushevych's émigré representation, also opposing the Polish settlement of eastern regions and efforts at Polonisation. The UNDO rejected Petrushevych's call to boycott the 1928 elections, which served to polarize Galician society into 'legalistic' and 'revolutionary' camps.

The UNDO reached a contentious normalization agreement with the Polish government in 1935, in the course of which Levytsky resigned and was replaced by Vasyl Mudry. The normalization agreement led to a split in the UNDO, though this was repaired in 1938 by which time the policy had largely been abandoned.

==== Ukrainian Military Organization ====
The UVO pursued a campaign of terror against Polish rule, including arson attacks against Polish landowners and settlers and an assassination attempt on Chief of State Marshal Józef Piłsudski in 1921. Following the assassination of Sydir Tverdokhlib in 1922 for his refusal to boycott the upcoming elections, its leadership went underground and Konovalets established the UVO's Supreme Command in exile, while a home command remained in Galicia. The UVO was initially subordinated to the ZUNR, though tensions between Konovalets and Petrushevych and the 1923 ruling led the UVO to force out Petrushevych's faction. Konovalets and the UVO became closely associated with Dontsov and received support from Weimar Germany, which helped it set up bases in Czechoslovakia, Lithuania, and Danzig.

==== Schwartzbard trial and Lypynsky–Dontsov polemic ====
In 1926, Petliura, head of the UPR in exile, was assassinated in Paris by Sholom Schwartzbard, a Jewish anarchist who claimed to be avenging the 1919 pogroms. In the immediate aftermath of the assassination, Petliura went from being perceived as a reviled statesman who sold out to the Poles to a national martyr. The sensational Schwartzbard trial the following year turned into a tribunal of Petliura and the UPR's responsibility for the pogroms, given that Schwartzbard's guilt was not in doubt. Jewish and Ukrainian communities mobilized in support of Schwartzbard and Petliura respectively, with the trial running the risk of discrediting the Ukrainian nationalist movement as antisemitic and minimising the independence war internationally. The trial ultimately ended in Schwartzbard's acquittal, which served to move Ukrainian nationalists to the right and justify antisemitic currents in Ukrainian politics amid rumors that Schwartzbard had acted as an agent of the NKVD.

Also in 1926, a highly acrimonious polemic ensued between Lypynsky and Dontsov that served as one of the main themes of discussion among nationalists going forward. Andrew Wilson describes Lypynksy and Dontsov as the two most influential Ukrainian nationalist thinkers of the twentieth century, with their feud symptomatic of a wider clash of ideas in Ukrainian politics between democratic and militant nationalism. Lypynsky saw the need for nation-building to be driven by an aristocracy and denounced the peasantry as an impoverished mass more interested in anarchy than building strong political institutions and a stable civil society. Dontsov meanwhile advocated the "initiative of the minority" in a Social Darwinian struggle for national survival. Dontsov argued for an ethnically homogenous nation cleansed of foreign influences, whereas Lypynsky viewed greater social differentiation as a source of stability.

==== Organization of Ukrainian Nationalists ====
In 1929, the UVO merged with several student and émigré nationalist groups to form the Organization of Ukrainian Nationalists (OUN), with Konovalets as its leader. The ideology of the OUN was heavily influenced by Dontsov's writings, Italian fascism, and, from 1930, Nazism. It has been characterized by scholars as a Ukrainian form of fascism and/or integral nationalism, itself sometimes characterized as proto-fascist. Stanley G. Payne considers the OUN to be "at the extreme end of the radical right, but not fully fascist" in his classification of authoritarian nationalist movements.

The OUN continued the UVO's terror tactics against Polish rule and Ukrainian moderates, though differences soon emerged between the more moderate OUN leadership abroad and radicals on the ground in Galicia, who Serhy Yekelchyk describes as developing a "cult of violence and self-reliance". In 1934, the OUN assassinated Polish Interior Minister Bronisław Pieracki and school principal Ivan Babii, after which the Polish government established Bereza Kartuska Prison for Ukrainian radicals. Stepan Bandera attained notoriety for his role in the assassination of Pieracki and the trials that followed, becoming one of the most popular figures among western Ukrainians. Polish pacification campaigns in Eastern Galicia and repressions (partly incited by OUN acts of terror and sabotage) led to waves of support for the OUN and, by the late 1930s, it had garnered the support of most of the politically active youth in western Ukraine.

In May 1938, Konovalets was assassinated in Rotterdam by NKVD agent Pavel Sudoplatov, with Andriy Melnyk appointed as his successor. The OUN supported Carpatho-Ukraine, with the Carpathian Sich composed of many of its members, though the OUN leadership's policy of caution sparked a dispute with its Galician activists. In August 1939, the OUN formally adopted the ideological platform of natsiokratiia authored by Mykola Stsiborskyi.

=== Second World War ===
With the outbreak of war between Nazi Germany and the Soviet Union in 1941, many nationalists in Ukraine thought that they would have an opportunity to create an independent country once again. An entire Ukrainian volunteer division of the Waffen SS had been created. Many of the fighters who had originally looked to the Nazis as liberators, quickly became disillusioned and formed the Ukrainian Insurgent Army (UPA) (Ukrainian: Українська Повстанська Армія), which waged military campaign against Germans and later Soviet forces as well against Polish civilians. The primary goal of OUN was "the rebirth, of setting everything in order, the defense and the expansion of the Independent Council of Ukrainian National State." The OUN also revived the sentiment that "Ukraine is for Ukrainians." In 1943, the UPA adopted a policy of massacring and expelling the Polish population. The ethnic cleansing operation against the Poles began on a large scale in Volhynia in late February, or early spring, of that year and lasted until the end of 1944. 11 July 1943 was one of the deadliest days of the massacres, with UPA units marching from village to village, killing Polish civilians. On that day, UPA units surrounded and attacked 99 Polish villages and settlements in the counties of Kowel, Horochów, and Włodzimierz Wołyński. On the following day, 50 additional villages were attacked. On 30 June 1941, the OUN, led by Stepan Bandera, declared an independent Ukrainian state. This was immediately acted upon by the Nazi army, and Bandera was arrested and imprisoned from 1941 to 1944.

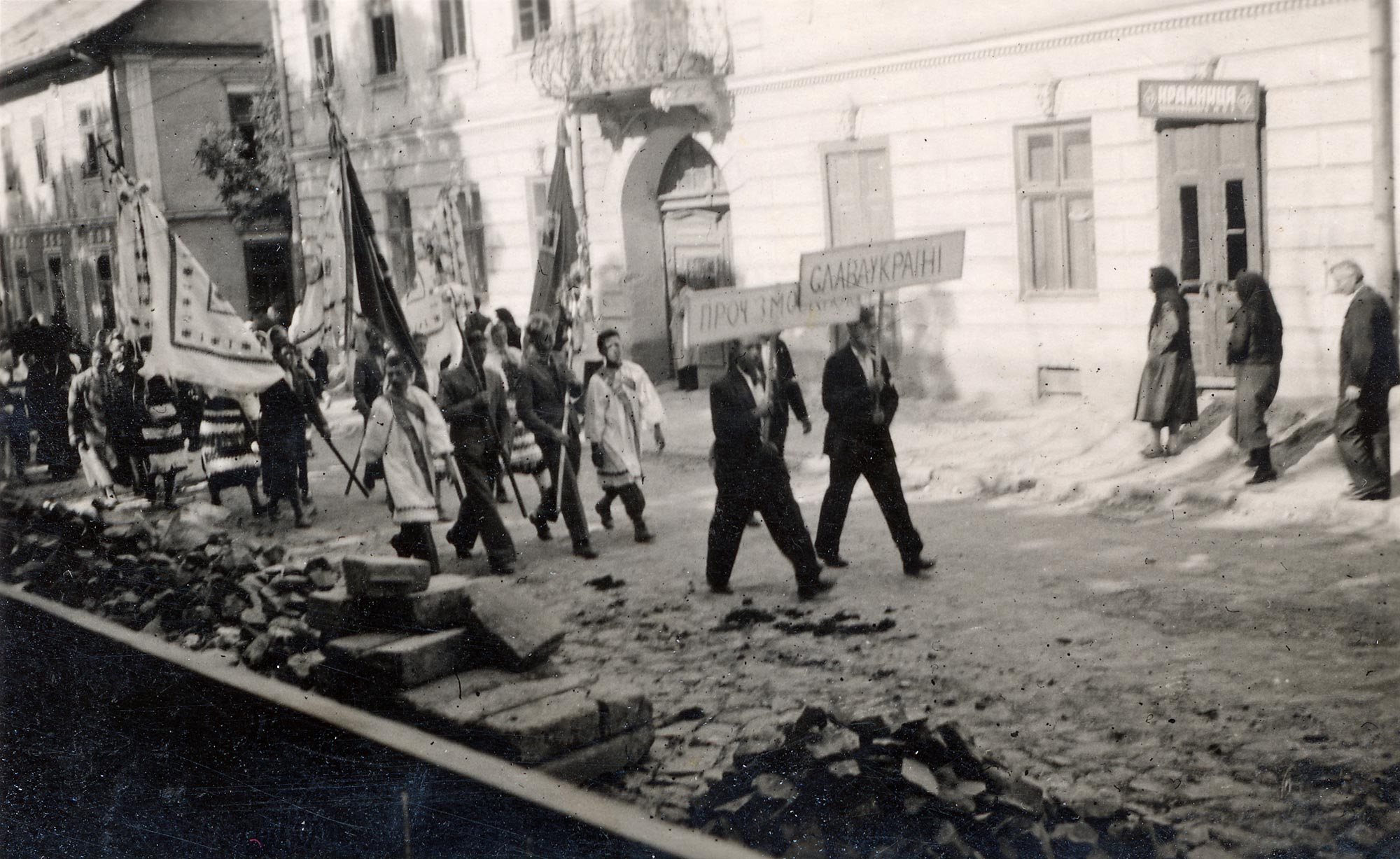
Ukrainian nationalists demonstrate against the Soviet Union and for an independent Ukraine in 1941.

There has been much debate as to the legitimacy of the UPA as a political group. The UPA maintains a prominent and symbolic role in Ukrainian history and the quest for Ukrainian independence. At the same time it was deemed an insurgent or terrorist group by Soviet historiography.

Ukrainian Canadian historian Serhiy Yekelchyk writes that during 1943 and 1944 an estimated 35,000 Polish civilians and an unknown number of Ukrainian civilians in the Volhynia and Chelm regions fell victim to mutual ethnic cleansing by the UPA and Polish insurgents. Niall Ferguson writes that around 80,000 Poles were murdered then by Ukrainian nationalists. In his book Europe at War 1939–1945: No Simple Victory, Norman Davies puts the number of Poles killed by Ukrainian nationalists between 200,000 and 500,000, while Timothy Snyder writes that the UPA killed "forty to sixty thousand Polish civilians in Volhynia in 1943."

=== Cold War era ===
==== 1945–1953 ====
In the post-World War II era, Stalin would still be the leader until his death in 1953. Early on in this era, the policy of Zhdanovschina was instituted, or the cultural-ideological purification of the Soviet Union. In the Ukrainian variant of this, any vestiges of nationalism were suppressed. Media that had been produced during the war to encourage Ukrainian patriotism, such as Ukraine in Flames, was denounced.

==== 1953–1972 ====
The Khrushchev Thaw started after Stalin's death. Under him, the first works of Samizdat appeared, and various people of Ukraine, whether it be ethnic Ukrainians, Crimean Tartars, and Jews, started publishing literature on both human rights and national/cultural rights issues. Under Petro Shelest, who became leader of the Ukrainian SSR from 1963 to 1972, there was a revival of Ukrainian culture particularly in the '60s, as some decision making was allowed for a time to moved back to Kyiv from the center (Moscow). The Shevchenko National Prize was created, with Oles Honchar as the first awardee.

The Sixtiers emerged as an important new source of intelligentsia, and had similarities to the Beat Generation in the west in cultural impact on later groups. The Sixtiers generation explicitly rejected Dontsovism and instead focused on individual rights, the rule of law, and constructing a common front with other Soviet dissidents. The period saw a resurgence of Ukrainian nationalist thought, associated with dissident writers such as Viacheslav Chornovil, Ivan Dziuba and Valentyn Moroz, which the authorities tried to stamp out through threats, arrests, and prison sentences.

==== 1972–1985 ====
Volodymyr Shcherbytsky took power over the Ukrainian SSR in 1972 until 1989. He was a member of the Politburo of the Communist Party of the Soviet Union, and a close friend of Leonid Brezhnev. As such, he was a very influential person in the Soviet Union, and led a very reactionary administration, aimed at centralizing power and suppressing dissent.

In 1975, the Helsinki Accords was passed, calling for a pan-European security structure. In 1976, Ukrainian Helsinki Group was formed to promote human rights, and this created a new nascent dissident movement.

==== 1985–1990 ====
Under Mikhail Gorbachev, a new era of Perestroika and Glasnost was instituted primarily to fix structural problems with the Soviet economy. In Ukraine, one year under Gorbachev, in April 1986, the disaster at Chornobyl occurred, and this incident did much to delegitimize the power of both the Communist Party and Volodymyr Shcherbytsky locally, after he ordered the children of the central committee and the Communist Party away from Kyiv to the Caucausus, while the city celebrated May Day. It also put Ukraine back on the world map, as the disaster was seen as an ecological problem not only locally, but potentially globally as well. The tragedy also started mobilizing the diaspora.

=== Post-independence ===
==== 1991–2014 ====
As opposed to the Soviet era, when nationality was understood in primarily ethnic terms where to be Ukrainian was something one would purely inherit, a gradual shift towards civic nationalism started in 1991 with the birth of the modern Ukrainian state. Ukraine chose to adopt pluralistic citizenship laws, which made everyone within its territorial borders a citizen, rejecting the model of Latvia and Estonia which adopted German-style ethnic citizenship laws which disenfranchised (self-identified) ethnic Russians. There has also been a gradual shift of self-identification of Russian-speaking Ukrainians away from a "Russian" self-identification. Even in the early 2000s, people from the Russian-speaking Odesa would often self-identify as "Russian" to foreigners and migrants, but not to Russians from the Russian Federation, indicating changes in identity.

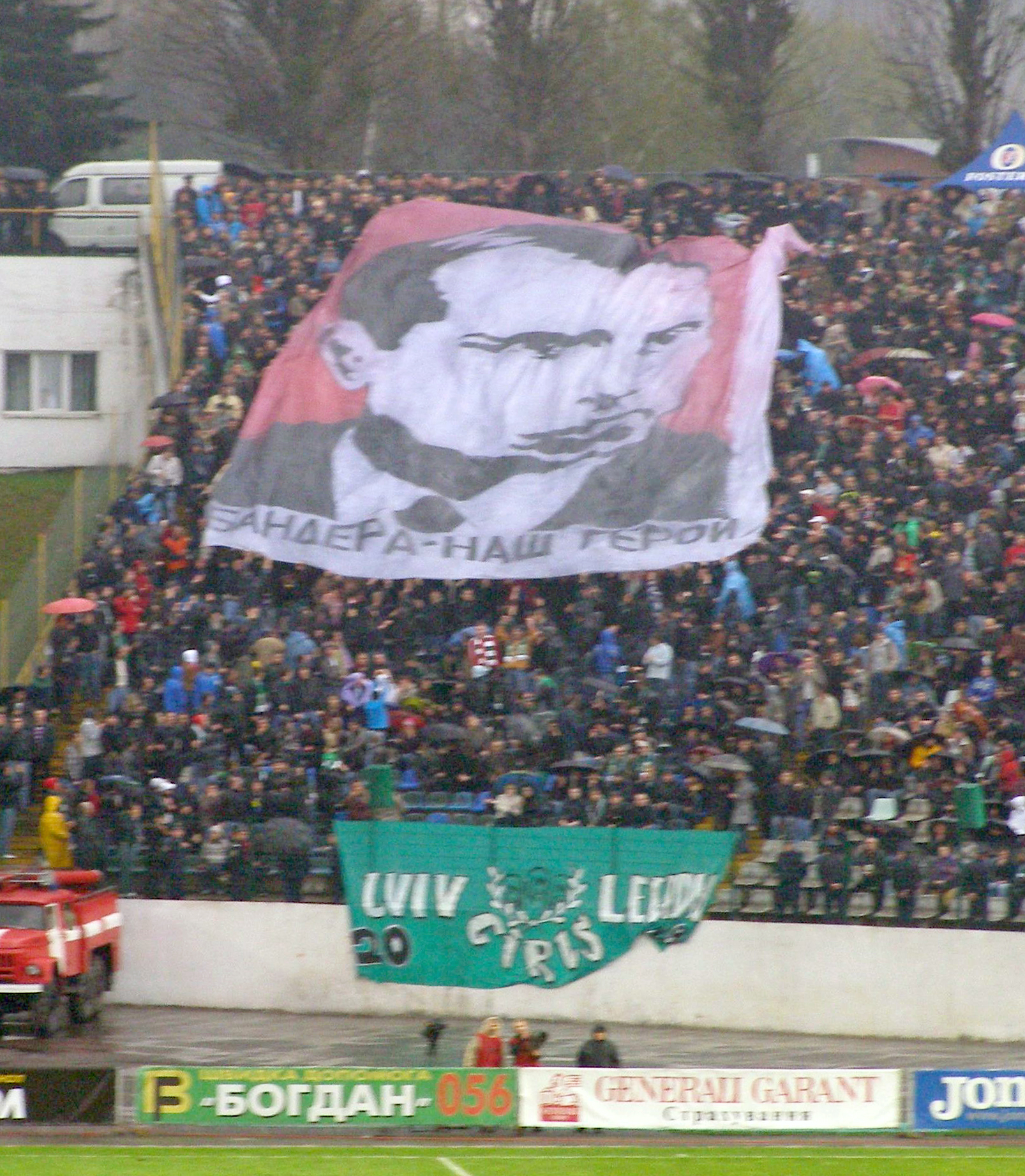
FC Lviv soccer fans at a game against FC Shakhtar Donetsk. The banner reads "Bandera – our hero".

In the first decade of the 21st century, voters from Western Ukraine and Central Ukraine tended to vote for pro-Western and pro-European general liberal national democrats, while pro-Russian parties got the vote in Eastern Ukraine and Southern Ukraine. From the 1998 Ukrainian parliamentary election (Note: In the 1998 parliamentary election, the radical-nationalist bloc of parties (All-Ukrainian Political Movement "State Independence of Ukraine" and Social-National Party of Ukraine) called Less Words (Ukrainian: Менше слів) collected 0.16% of the national vote but Oleh Tyahnybok was voted into Parliament from the bloc only.) until the 2012 Ukrainian parliamentary election, no nationalist party obtained seats in the Verkhovna Rada (Ukraine's parliament). In these elections, nationalist right-wing parties obtained less than 1% of the votes; in the 1998 parliamentary election, they obtained 3.26%.

The nationalist party Svoboda had an electoral breakthrough with the 2009 Ternopil Oblast local election, when they obtained 34.69% of the votes and 50 seats out of 120 in the Ternopil Oblast Council. This was the best result for a far-right party in Ukraine's history. In the previous 2006 Ternopil Oblast local election, the party had obtained 4.2% of the votes and 4 seats. In the simultaneous 2006 Ukrainian local elections for the Lviv Oblast Council, it had obtained 5.62% of the votes and 10 seats and 6.69% of the votes and 9 seats in the Lviv City Council. In 1991, Svoboda was founded as the Social-National Party of Ukraine. The party combined radical nationalism and alleged neo-Nazi features. Under Oleh Tyahnybok, it was renamed and rebranded in 2004 as the All-Ukrainian Association Svoboda. Political scientists Olexiy Haran and Alexander J. Motyl contend that Svoboda is radical rather than fascist and they also argue that it has more similarities with far-right movements such as the Tea Party movement than it has with either fascists or neo-Nazis. In 2005, Victor Yushchenko appointed Volodymyr Viatrovych head of the Ukrainian security service (SBU) archives. According to professor Per Anders Rudling, this not only allowed Viatrovych to sanitize ultra-nationalist history but also to officially promote its dissemination along with OUN(b) ideology, which is based on "ethnic purity" coupled with anti-Russian, anti-Polish, and antisemitic rhetoric. The extreme right-wing now capitalizes on Yushchenkoist propaganda initiatives. This includes Iuryi Mykhal'chyshyn, an ideologue who proudly confesses that he is a part of the fascist tradition. The autonomous nationalists focus on recruiting young people, participating in violent actions, and advocating "anti-bourgeoism, anti-capitalism, anti-globalism, anti-democratism, anti-liberalism, anti-bureaucratism, anti-dogmatism". Rulig suggested that Ukrainian President Viktor Yanukovych, sworn in on 25 February 2010, "indirectly aided Svoboda" by "granting Svoboda representatives disproportionate attention in the media".

In the 2010 Ukrainian local elections, Svoboda achieved notable success in Eastern Galicia. In the 2012 parliamentary election, Svoboda came in fourth with 10,44% (almost a fourteenfold of its votes compared with the 2007 Ukrainian parliamentary election) of the national votes and 38 out of 450 seats. Following the 2012 parliamentary election, Batkivshchyna and UDAR cooperated officially with Svoboda.

==== 2014–2022 ====
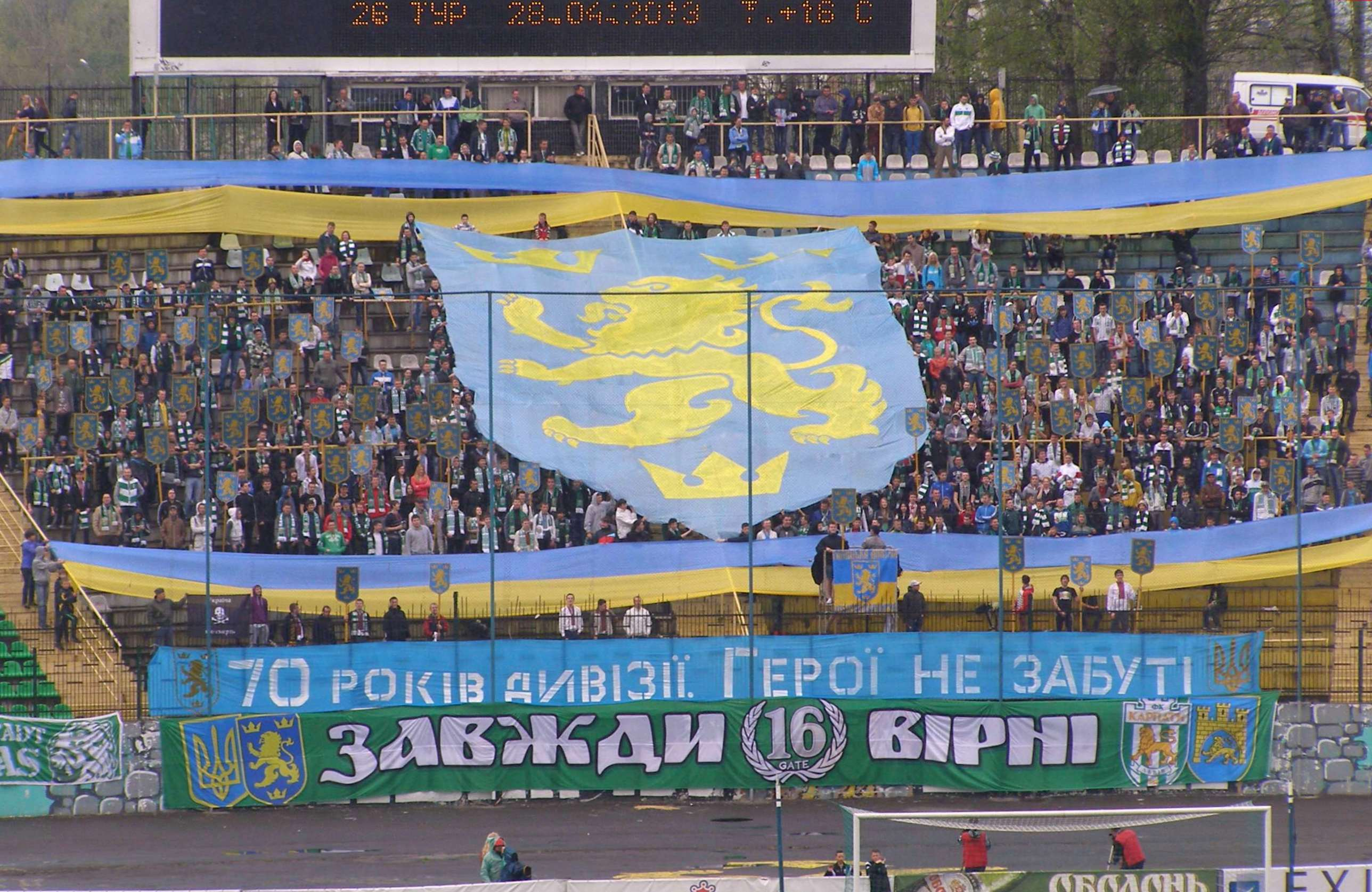
Fans of FC Karpaty Lviv honoring the Waffen-SS Galizien division, 2013

Euromaidan activists wave Ukraine's official flag, the flag of the Ukrainian People's Self-Defense, and the red-and-black flag, March 2014.

During the ongoing Russo-Ukrainian War, Russian media attempted to portray the Ukrainian party in the conflict as neo-Nazi, with Russian president Vladimir Putin claiming in early 2022 that Ukraine was an 'artificial country run by Nazis'. Scholars such as historians and political scientists generally regard such claims as unfounded. Dutch historian of Ukraine Marc Jansen stated in 2022: 'There are far-right, anti-Semitic parties in Ukraine, but they play no significant role in the national government.' Although certain neo-Nazi-like groups such as the Azov Battalion participated in Euromaidan (alongside many other groups), and some were incorporated into the Ukrainian military and deployed in Donbas, that didn't make the Zelenskyy government 'neo-Nazis', said Jansen, who pointed out that Volodymyr Zelenskyy (elected president in 2019) is Jewish and his family has suffered in the Holocaust, with several relatives being killed by the Nazis. Andriy Biletsky, the head of the ultra-nationalist and neo-Banderaite political groups Social-National Assembly and Patriots of Ukraine, was also the first commander of the Azov Battalion and the Azov Battalion was part of the Ukrainian National Guard fighting pro-Russian separatists in the War in Donbas. According to a report in The Daily Telegraph, some individual anonymous members of the battalion identified themselves as sympathetic to the Third Reich. In June 2015, Democratic Representative John Conyers and his Republican colleague Ted Yoho offered bipartisan amendments to block the US military training of Ukraine's Azov Battalion.

After President Yanokovych's ouster in the February 2014 Ukrainian revolution, the interim Yatsenyuk Government placed four Svoboda members in leading positions; Oleksandr Sych as Vice Prime Minister of Ukraine, Ihor Tenyukh as Minister of Defense, lawyer Ihor Shvaika as Minister of Agrarian Policy and Food, and Andriy Mokhnyk as Minister of Ecology and Natural Resources of Ukraine. In a 5 March 2014 fact sheet, the US State Department stated that "[f]ar-right wing ultranationalist groups, some of which were involved in open clashes with security forces during the Euromaidan protests, are not represented in the Ukrainian parliament."

In the 2014 Ukrainian presidential election and 2014 Ukrainian parliamentary election, Svoboda candidates failed to meet the electoral threshold to win. The party won six constituency seats in the 2014 parliamentary election and obtained 4.71% of national election list votes. In the 2014 presidential election, Svoboda leader Oleh Tyahnybok received 1.16% of the vote. Right Sector leader Dmytro Yarosh gained 0.7% of the votes in the 2014 presidential election, and was elected to parliament in the 2014 parliamentary election as a Right Sector candidate by winning a single-member district. Right Sector spokesperson Boryslav Bereza as an independent candidate also won a seat and district.

The Euromaidan, the annexation of Crimea by the Russian Federation and the War in Donbas have in the post-2014 years led to profound political, socio-economic and cultural-religious consequences for Ukrainian society. While it was a divided bilingual country between 1991 and 2014, the occupied parts became increasingly (pro-) Russian and the unoccupied parts more pro-European, pro-western and more monolingually Ukrainian. Unoccupied Ukraine developed into an increasingly united society, characterised to a large extent by its opposition to the government of Putin and to a lesser extent Russia, the Russian language and culture. In October 2018, there was also a schism between the Russian Orthodox Church and the Ecumenical Patriarchate of Constantinople when the latter granted autonomy to the Orthodox Church of Ukraine. According to historian Marc Jansen (2022): 'It is precisely because of the war in eastern Ukraine, which has been raging since 2014, that Ukraine has become a largely unified country. Putin has done more for Ukrainian nation-building than anyone else.' Other scholars also noted an acceleration of civic nationalism in a broad spectrum of Ukrainian society, such as political scientist Lowell Barrington of Marquette University, who said this type of nationalism bonds people through "feelings of solidarity, sympathy and obligation" rather than ethnicity. According to political scientist Oxana Shevel, author of the 2021 book From ‘the Ukraine’ to Ukraine, this was a result of aggression by Russia: 'In a paradoxical twist, Putin is basically unifying the Ukrainian nation.' This was also reflected in sociological data, despite Ukraine not having conducted a census since 2001.

The radical nationalists group С14, whose members openly expressed neo-Nazi views, gained notoriety in 2018 for being involved in violent attacks on Romany camps.

On 19 November 2018, Svoboda and fellow Ukrainian nationalist political organizations Organization of Ukrainian Nationalists, Congress of Ukrainian Nationalists, Right Sector, and C14 endorsed Ruslan Koshulynskyi's candidacy in the 2019 Ukrainian presidential election. In the election, Ruslan Koshulynskyi's and all united nationalist party received 1.6% of the votes. In the 2019 Ukrainian parliamentary election, a united party list with the nationalist right-wing parties Svoboda, Right Sector, Governmental Initiative of Yarosh, and National Corps completely failed elections with 2.15% of the votes and did not receive enough votes to clear the 5% election threshold, and thus lost all seats in Verkhovna Rada. Svoboda did win one constituency seat in the election. Boryslav Bereza and Dmytro Yarosh lost their parliamentary seats.

Volodymyr Zelenskyy won the 2019 presidential election in Ukraine. He ran for the Servant of the People party which has previously argued for "mild Ukrainization".

==== 2022–present ====
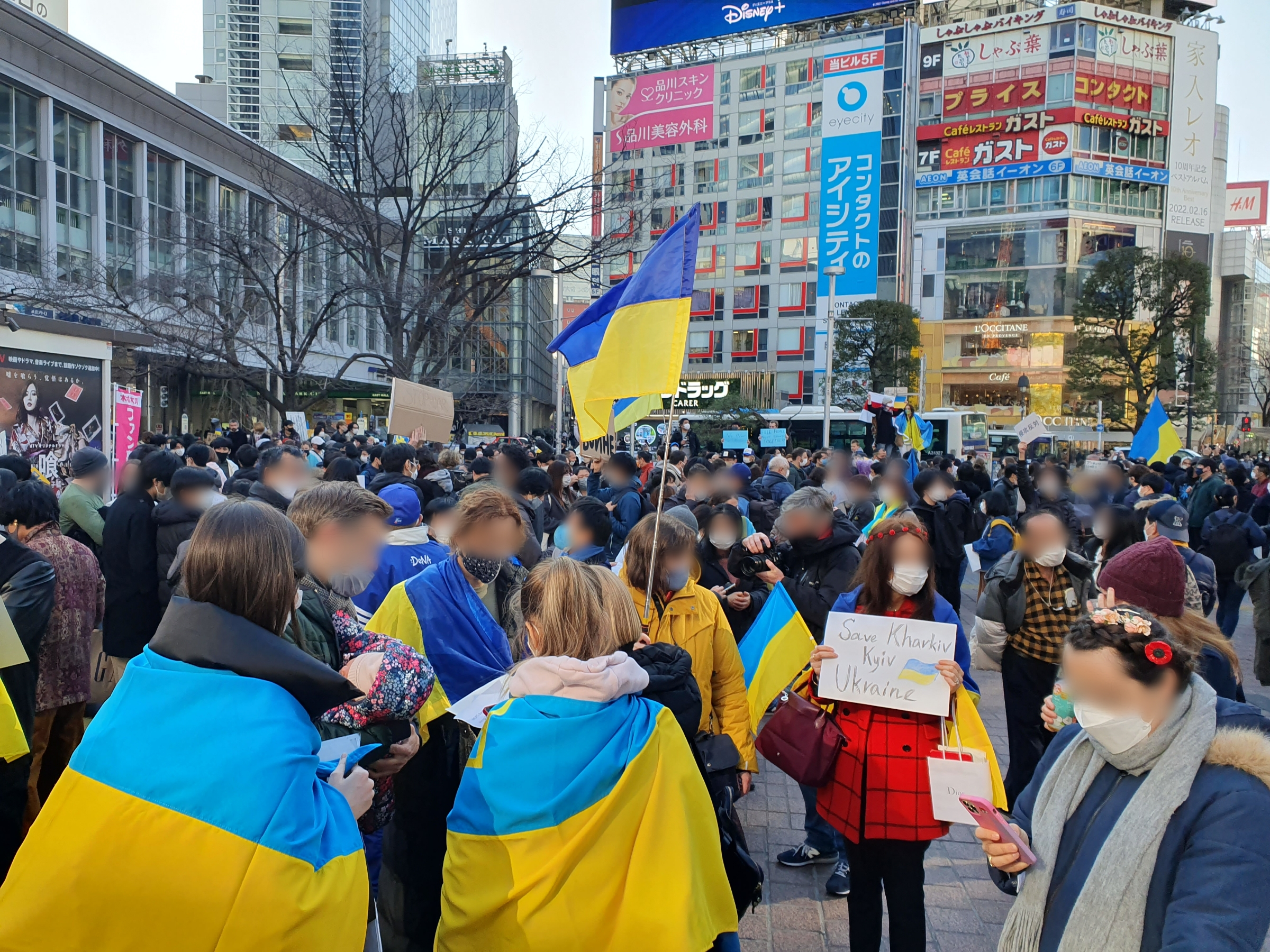
Pro-Ukrainian protestors in Tokyo, Japan, demonstrating support with the flag of Ukraine

During the Russian invasion of Ukraine, there has been a large increase in pro-Ukrainian position inside Ukraine. In other countries, the Ukrainian flag has been used to show support for the Ukrainian cause during the war. There was also a rapid shift in pro-Ukrainian attitudes in the eastern part of the country, including people vowing to use the Ukrainian language more. A study of survey data from 2019, 2021, and 2022 indicated that the eight-year war and major Russian invasion had strengthened pro-European and pro-democratic civic identity, rather than ethnolinguistic or ethnonational identity.

A derussification campaign swept through Ukraine following the February 2022 invasion. Among other renamings, in the central Ukrainian city Dnipro the Schmidt Street (the street was originally the Gymnasium Street but it was renamed to Otto Schmidt Street by Soviet authorities in 1934) was renamed to Stepan Bandera Street. Meanwhile several Ukrainian cities removed statues and busts of the 19th century Russian poet Alexander Pushkin.

Public school curriculum are no longer prescribing works by Russian authors, and publishing books written by Russian nationals was outlawed.

== Nationalist political parties ==
=== Current ===
- People's Movement of Ukraine (1990–present)
- Ukrainian National Assembly – Ukrainian People's Self-Defence (1990–present)
- Congress of Ukrainian Nationalists (1992–present)
- All-Ukrainian Union "Freedom" (1995–present)
- All-Ukrainian Union "Fatherland" (1999–present)
- Ukrainian People's Party (2002–present)
- Ukrainian Republican Party (2006–present)
- Radical Party of Oleh Liashko (2010–present)
- European Solidarity (2014–present)
- Right Sector (2013–present)
- People's Front (2014–present)
- National Corps (2016–present)

=== Defunct ===
- Ukrainian Radical Party (1890–1950)
- Revolutionary Ukrainian Party (1900–1905)
- Borotbists (1918–1920)
- Ukrainian Communist Party (1920–1925)
- All-Ukrainian Political Movement "State Independence of Ukraine" (1990–2003)
- Social-National Party of Ukraine (1991–2004)
- UKROP (2015–2020)

== In literature ==
One of the most prominent figures in Ukrainian national history, the Ukrainian poet Taras Shevchenko, voiced ideas of an independent and sovereign Ukraine in the 19th century. Taras Shevchenko used poetry to inspire cultural revival to the Ukrainian people and to strive to overthrow injustice. Shevchenko died in Saint Petersburg on 10 March 1861, the day after his 47th birthday. Ukrainians regard him as a national hero, becoming a symbol of the national cultural revival of Ukraine. Beside Shevchenko, numerous other poets have written in Ukrainian. Among them, Volodymyr Sosyura stated in his poem Love Ukraine (1944) that one cannot respect other nations without respect for one's own.

== See also ==
- Ukrainian National Revival
- Ukrainophilia
- Ukrainization
- Far-right politics in Ukraine
- Greater Ukraine
- Russo-Ukrainian War
- Russia–Ukraine relations
- Chronology of Ukrainian language suppression
- Derussification in Ukraine

== Bibliography ==
- Armstrong, John (1963). Ukrainian Nationalism (2nd ed.). New York: Columbia University Press.
- Davies, Norman (2006). Europe at War 1939-1945: No Simple Victory. London: Macmillan. ISBN 978-0-333-69285-1. OCLC 70401618.
- Erlacher, Trevor (2021). Ukrainian Nationalism in the Age of Extremes: An Intellectual Biography of Dmytro Dontsov. Cambridge, MA: Harvard University Press. doi:10.2307/j.ctv2d8qwsn. ISBN 978-067-425-093-2. JSTOR j.ctv2d8qwsn.
- Gomza, Ivan (2015). "Elusive Proteus: A study in the ideological morphology of the Organization of Ukrainian Nationalists". Communist and Post-Communist Studies. 48 (2–3): 195–207. doi:10.1016/j.postcomstud.2015.06.005 – via online.ucpress.edu.
- Himka, John-Paul (2022). "Reclaiming the Past, Confronting the Past: OUN–UPA Memory Politics and Nation Building in Ukraine (1991–2016)". War and Memory in Russia, Ukraine and Belarus. Palgrave Macmillan Memory Studies. pp. 107–137. doi:10.1007/978-3-319-66523-8_4. ISBN 978-3-319-66523-8.
- Magocsi, Paul R. (2002). The Roots of Ukrainian Nationalism: Galicia As Ukraine's Piedmont. University of Toronto Press. ISBN 0-8020-4738-6.
- Motyl, Alexander J. (1980). The Turn to the Right: The Ideological Origins and Development of Ukrainian Nationalism, 1919–1929. East European quarterly. ISBN 978-091-471-058-5.
- Rossoliński-Liebe, Grzegorz (2011). "The 'Ukrainian National Revolution' of 1941. Discourse and Practice of a Fascist Movement". Kritika: Explorations in Russian and Eurasian History. 12 (1): 83–114. doi:10.1353/kri.2011.a411661.
- Rudling, Per Anders (2011). "The OUN, the UPA and the Holocaust: A Study in the Manufacturing of Historical Myths". The Carl Beck Papers in Russian and East European Studies. 2107. Pittsburgh: University Center for Russian and East European Studies.
- Wilson, Andrew (1996). Ukrainian Nationalism in the 1990s: A Minority Faith. Cambridge: Cambridge University Press. ISBN 978-052-157-457-0.
- Wysocki, Roman (2003). Organizacja ukraińskich nacjonalistów w Polsce w latach 1929-1939: geneza, struktura, program, ideologia [The Organisation of Ukrainian Nationalists in Poland in 1929-1939: Genesis, Structure, Programme, Ideology] (in Polish). Lublin: UMCS Publishing House.
- Yekelchyk, Serhy (2007). Ukraine: Birth of a Modern Nation (PDF). Oxford: Oxford University Press. ISBN 978-0-19-530545-6.
- Zaitsev, Oleksandr (2014). "Ukrainskyi intehralnyi natsionalizm (1920–1930-ti roky): heneza, evoliutsiia, porivnialnyi analiz" [Ukrainian integral nationalism (1920s–1930s): Genesis, evolution, comparative analysis] (PDF) (in Ukrainian). PhD diss., National Academy of Sciences of Ukraine.
- Zaitsev, Oleksandr (2021). "Integral Nationalism in the Absence of a Nation-State". In Bresciani, Marco (ed.). Conservatives and Right Radicals in Interwar Europe. Abingdon, Oxfordshire: Routledge. pp. 118–142.
