= History of the Ukrainian minority in Poland =

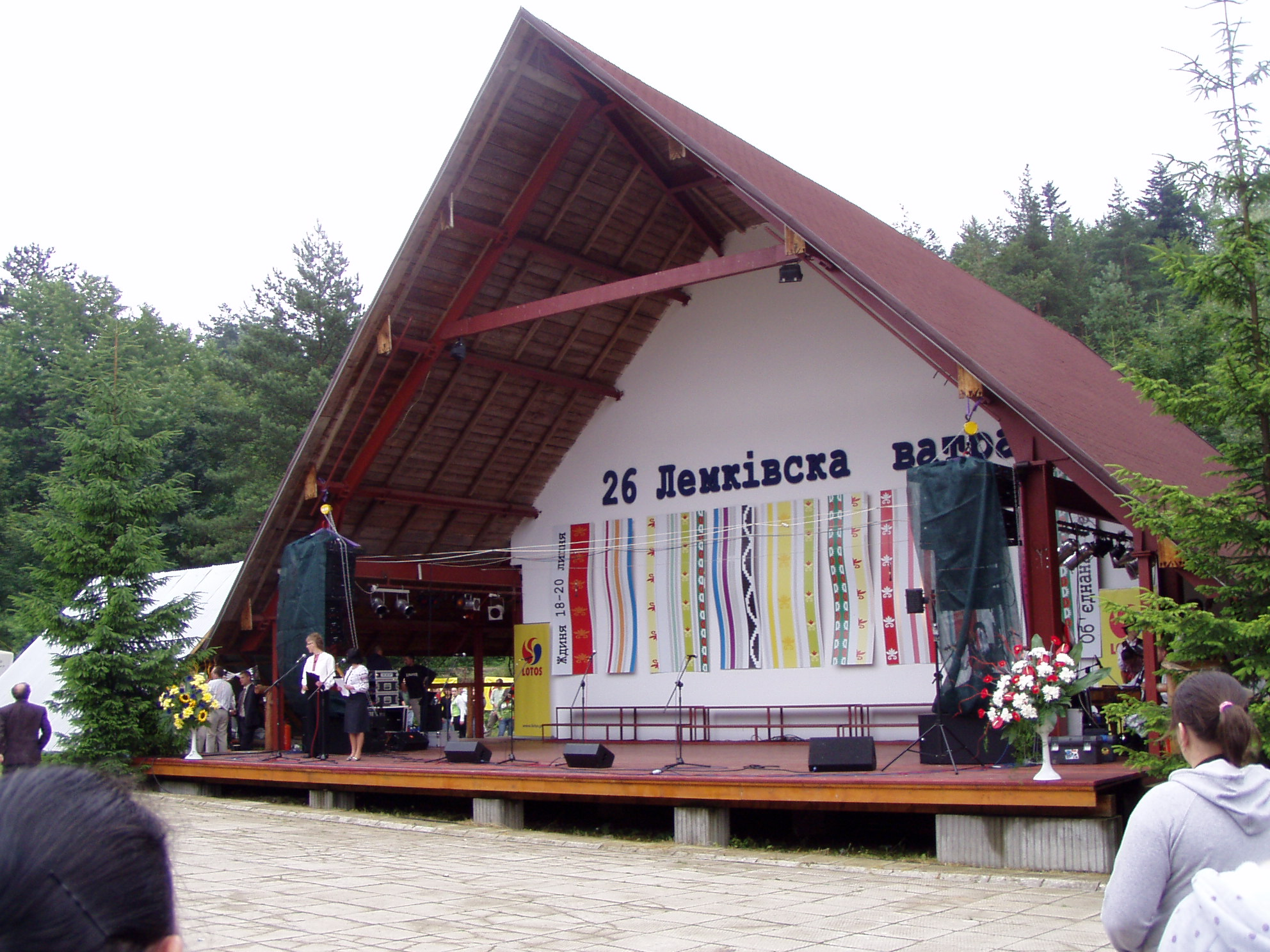
The 26 Lemko Festival in Zdynia, "Lemkivska Vatra", 2008

The history of the Ukrainian minority in Poland dates back to the Late Middle Ages, preceding the 14th century Galicia–Volhynia Wars between Casimir III the Great of Poland, and Liubartas of Lithuania. Following the extinction of the Rurikid dynasty in 1323, the Polish Kingdom extended further east in 1340 to include the lands of Przemyśl and in 1366, Kamianets-Podilskyi (Kamieniec Podolski). After the Union of Lublin (1569), principalities of Galicia and Western Volhynia became, what is known as, the Ruthenian Voivodeship of the Polish Crown, while the rest of Red Ruthenia together with Kyiv came under Lithuanian control. The Polish borders reached as far east as Zaporizhzhia and Poltava.

== Kingdom of Poland and Polish-Lithuanian Commonwealth ==
The annexation of Red Ruthenia by Casimir III (Kazimierz) came about as a result of the Polish–Lithuanian peace treaty signed in 1366. It was a two-stage affair, according to Hustyn Chronicle by Zakhariia Kopystensky (d.1627). The Polish King vowed to respect the Orthodox faith, but also, bestowed the Ruthenian gentry with the same rights as the Polish. Kopystensky—the re-discoverer of the ancient Hypatian Codex of southern Rus – regarded the eastern Slavs as "one nation in the medieval sense of the term, descended from a common ancestor." He "clearly differentiates between Muscovy and Ukraine-Rus'" in his work. The total area of Ruthenian lands annexed by Poland was about 91,000 km^{2} (35,135 sq mi), and most of the population spoke Ruthenian (a linguistic predecessor of both modern Ukrainian and Belarusian).

The local nobility gradually became polonized, and many members of the Ruthenian szlachta converted to Roman Catholicism. Among the most famous Ruthenian families who polonized themselves were the Wiśniowiecki, Zbarascy, Zasławski, and Czartoryski families. Others, such as the Ostrogski, Sanguszko, and Kisiel families, resisted polonization. All these noble Ruthenian families were very influential in pre-1795 Poland, and one of the Polish kings, Michael Korybut Wiśniowiecki, was the son of a notable Ruthenian magnate Jeremi Wiśniowiecki. Ukrainian historian Mykhailo Hrushevsky and representative of populist movement in Ukraine, attacked Poland, claiming: "the four centuries of Polish rule had left particularly destructive effects (...) economic and cultural backwardness in Galicia was the main "legacy of historical Poland, which assiduously skimmed everything that could be considered the cream of the nation, leaving it in a state of oppression and helplessness".

== Second Polish Republic ==
Poland re-established its sovereignty in 1918 after a century of rule by Austria-Hungary, the German, and the Russian Empires; however, Poland's western and eastern borders were not determined at inception. The Soviet, Polish and Ukrainian claims over the disputed territories led to the Polish–Ukrainian and Polish–Soviet wars. The end of open warfare was achieved with the logistical aid by France. A formal treaty, the Peace of Riga, was signed on 18 March 1921, establishing Polish borders for the period between the World Wars. A process of economic recovery followed.

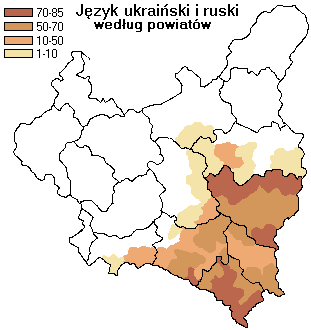
Ukrainian and Ruthenian language speakers by mother tongue in the Second Polish Republic, 1931

After the Polish-Ukrainian War, the eastern part of Galicia and Volhynia were captured by Poland. Ukrainian leaders at that time were retained a strong sense of honor. During the entire time of its existence, there were no cases of mass repressions against national minorities in territories held by the West Ukrainian government; the Ukrainian forces controlling the city even neglected to arrest Polish nationalist leaders and intelligentsia, enabling the latter to rebel against the Ukrainian government.

Polish forces captured Lviv after a week-long battle with the Ukrainian forces. They claimed they were fired at in the streets by civilians when they entered the city, and retaliated. They burned the Ukrainian and Jewish sections and killed approximately 270 Ukrainians; however, the British mission also noted that there were no clear conclusions as to the specific motive behind the massacre. The percentage of Jews killed corresponds to the demographics in Lviv at that time.

In the eastern half of Galicia, Ukrainians made up approximately 65% of the population while Poles made up 22% of the population and Jews made up 12%. Of the 44 administrative divisions of Austrian eastern Galicia, Lviv (Polish: Lwów, German: Lemberg), the biggest and capital city of the province, was the only one in which Poles made up a majority of the population. Ukrainians represented about 16% of the total population of the pre-war Poland. Over 90% of them lived in the countryside, 3–6 percent were industrial workers, and close to 1% belonged to Intelligentsia. As to religion, 60 percent were Uniate Catholics and 39 percent professed Eastern Orthodox faith. While national consciousness among the Galician Ukrainians was strong, the Ukrainians of Volhynia had little national orientation and were largely influenced by Russophile and pro-Soviet trends.

According to the Polish census of 1931 the following areas hosted a large number of Ukrainian speakers by first language in Poland:

- Lwów; 63.48% Polish 7.77% Ukrainian,
- Lwów Voivodeship; 57.67% Polish, 18.53% Ukrainian,
- Stanisławów Voivodeship; 46.87% Ukrainian, 22.44% Polish,
- Tarnopol Voivodeship; 49.31% Polish, 25.12% Ukrainian,
- Wołyń Voivodeship; 68.01% Ukrainian, 16.62% Polish.

Two contradicting policies towards national minorities were competing in Poland at the time. The assimilationist approach advocated by Roman Dmowski (minister of foreign affairs) and Stanisław Grabski (minister of religion and education) clashed with the more tolerant approach advocated by the Polish chief of State Józef Piłsudski, whose project of creating the Międzymorze federation with other states failed in the aftermath of the Polish-Soviet War. The ultranationalist Roman Dmowski and his National Democrats, with its consistent militantly anti-Ukrainian policies, was supported by the Polish minority in Eastern Galicia.

From 1918 to 1924, Polish institutions officially acknowledged Ukrainian as a public language only Eastern Galicia. This changed with the language laws passed in 1924, which permitted members of the Ukrainian minority to use Ukrainian in public administration offices and local government bodies in the voivodeships of Lwów, Tarnopol, Stanisławów, Wołyń, and Polesie, as well as in courts.

=== Political and cultural life ===
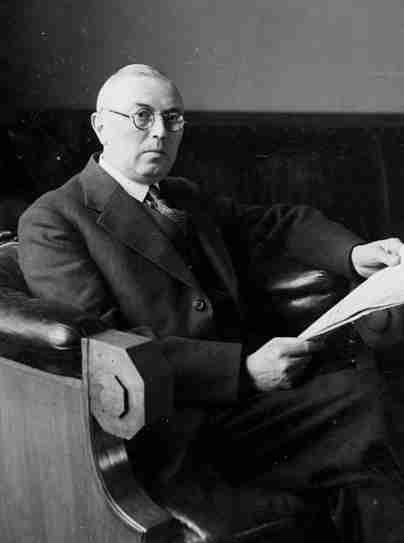
Vasyl Mudry, Ukrainian speaker of the Polish parliament, leader of the Ukrainian National Democratic Alliance (the largest Ukrainian political party in interwar Poland).

The Polish authorities renamed the eastern part of Austrian Galicia "Eastern Little Poland" and created administrative units (Palatinates) designed to include as many non-Ukrainians as possible. In 1924 the Polish government under Władysław Grabski excluded the Ukrainian language from use in government institutions. It also avoided the official use of the word "Ukrainian", replacing it with the historical name "Ruthenian".

There were nine legal Ukrainian and Ruthenian parties, reflecting a full range of political opinion. Ukrainians during the interbellum had several representatives in the Sejm. In 1928–1930 there were 26 Ukrainian MPs in Polish parliament, including Marshall Deputy of the Sejm, Volodymyr Zahajkiewicz and the Secretary of the Sejm, Dymitr Ladyka. Ukrainian and Belarusian deputies created a powerful "Ukrainian-Belarusian Club" (Klub Ukrainsko-Bialoruski), whose members were very active in those years. In 1935 there were 19 Ukrainian deputies, and in 1938 – 14, including Vasyl Mudry – Deputy Marshal of the Polish Sejm.

On 12 July 1930, activists of the Organization of Ukrainian Nationalists (OUN), together with Ukrainian Military Organization, began the so-called sabotage action, during which Polish estates were burned, roads, rail lines and telephone connections were destroyed. The OUN used terrorism and sabotage in order to force the Polish government into reprisals so fierce that they would cause the more moderate Ukrainian groups ready to negotiate with the Polish state to lose support. OUN directed its violence not only against the Poles, but also against Ukrainians who wished for a peaceful settlement of the Polish-Ukrainian conflict. In response to this terrorism, the Polish government implemented its so-called pacification in Galician villages suspected of support for UVO. Polish security forces conducted thorough search in Ukrainian houses and buildings, devastating many of them in the process, destroying Ukrainian books, folk dresses, as well as other cultural objects. They frequently forced Ukrainian villages to sign an oath of loyalty to Poland and renounce allegiance to the Ukrainian nation, and inflicted corporal punishment in the form of public whippings. According to Ukrainian sources, seven people were beaten to death while the Polish sources put the number of dead at two. In addition, several Ukrainian members of the Polish parliament, including Vasyl Mudry, were arrested after the Polish authorities discovered that there had been contact between the Ukrainian political parties and UVO. Ukrainian secondary schools were closed down. Poland's Pacification of Western Ukraine was condemned by Great Britain, France and Germany, although the League of Nations released a statement claiming that Polish activities were justified due to Ukrainian sabotage activities.

In 1935 the situation temporarily improved, as the Polish government reached an agreement with the Ukrainian National Democratic Alliance (UNDO), the largest Ukrainian political party in Poland; most prisoners of the Bereza Kartuska prison were released. Ukrainian language education and their political representation improved. But key demands by the Ukrainians, such as local autonomy, a Ukrainian-language university, and an end to Polish colonization efforts on territories inhabited by Ukrainians, were never met. Ukrainian extremists continued their attacks on the Poles, and the moderates lost their bid to stabilize the situation. A Polish report about the popular mood in Volhynia recorded a comment of a young Ukrainian from October 1938: "we will decorate our pillars with you and our trees with your wives."

Ukrainian organizations continued to grow in spite of Polish interference that included destroying reading rooms during pacification in 1930 and banning them in certain regions. Despite such measures, Prosvita society was able to increase the number of reading-room libraries to 3,075 by 1939 (with over 500 new outlets by 1936 with full-time professional staff). There was the Luh sobriety association, and the Ukrainian National Democratic Alliance, several newspapers (including Dilo) and the sports organizations. The new Ukraina Lwow soccer team was close to promotion to the Ekstraklasa (a Polish professional league for football clubs). The government statistics for the year 1937 listed about 3,516 Ukrainian co-operative unions with a total of 661,000 members. Polish government made efforts to limit them, including forcibly merging them with Polish cooperatives in some regions.

The Ukrainian cultural life and political representation in Poland sharply contrasted with that of the Stalinist Soviet Union. The Ukrainian people in the Soviet Ukraine "suffered more from Stalin's rule than any other European part of the USSR" in the same period, ravaged by the terror of Great Famine and the killing of thousands of educated Ukrainians. Because Polish discriminatory policies stopped short of mass murder and complete destruction of Ukrainian cultural and political forces, the Ukrainian population was frustrated and outraged but not broken.

Polish governance brought material progress to many Ukrainians. During the 1920s, electrification and telephone service were introduced to all major towns, and the share of children receiving school education rose from 15% to 70% in Volhynia alone. The Polish Ministry of Education increased the number of schools in the Ukrainian areas more than three-fold, to 3,100 by 1938, thus reducing the illiteracy rate among people ten-years-and-older from 50% down to 35% by 1931.

=== Policies of Józef Piłsudski and the "Volhynia Experiment" ===
In May 1926 Józef Piłsudski took power in Poland through a Coup D'état. Piłsudski's reign marked the much-needed improvement in the situation of ethnic minorities. Piłsudski replaced the National-Democratic "ethnic assimilation" with a "state assimilation" policy: citizens were judged by their loyalty to the state, not by their nationality. However the continuing series of terrorist attacks by the Organization of Ukrainian Nationalists to sabotage Piłsudski's efforts, resulted in government pacifications and meant that the situation continued to degenerate.

While Ukrainian nationalism was well-established in Galicia and the Ukrainian inhabitants there were generally hostile to Polish rule, the Ukrainian-inhabited region of Volhynia was less developed. Accordingly, the Polish government sought to isolate the Ukrainians of Galicia from those in Volhynia and to assimilate Volhynians to the Polish state politically, by combining support for Ukrainian culture and language with loyalty to the Polish state. It thus hoped to create a pro-Polish Ukrainian identity that could serve as a model for the Ukrainians being oppressed across the Soviet border from Volhynia.

In 1928 Henryk Józewski, the former deputy minister for internal affairs in the Ukrainian government of Symon Petliura, was nominated the voivode of Volhynia, to carry out the program of cultural and religious autonomy for Ukrainians in that region. Józewski, a Pole from Kiev (where, unlike in Galicia, Poles and Ukrainians had a history of cooperating with one another), was a Ukrainophile who felt that the Polish and Ukrainian nations were deeply connected and that Ukraine might one day become a "Second fatherland" for Poles. Józewski brought Ukrainian followers of Symon Petliura, including former officers in Petliura's army, to his capital of Lutsk in order to help in his Volhynian administration. He hung portraits of Petliura alongside those of Pilsudski in public places. The Polish authorities established the Institute for the Study of Nationality Affairs and educational society for the Orthodox (named after Petro Mohyla, it expanded to 870 chapters in Volhynia). The government financed Ukrainian reading societies (they had 5,000 chapters in 1937) and Ukrainian Theater. The use of Ukrainian language, instead of Russian, during church sermons was encouraged. Józewski also led the negotiations regarding formal recognizion of the Orthodox church, which was not subject to any legal regulations in Poland until 1938. A loyal Ukrainian political party, the Volhynian Ukrainian Alliance, was created. This party was the only Ukrainian political party allowed to freely function in Volhynia. During the period of his governance, Józewski was the object of two assassination attempts: by Soviet agents in 1932 and by Ukrainian nationalists in 1934.

After his sponsor Pilsudski's death in 1935, Józewski's Ukrainian programme was cancelled. The anti-Ukrainian Polish elements in the Polish military took control over policies in Volhynia. Józewski was criticized for allowing Ukrainians to buy land from Poles, Orthodox churches were demolished or converted to Catholic use during the "revindication" campaign, and by 1938 Józewski himself lost his post. Under his successor, all state support for Ukrainian institutions was eliminated, and it was recommended that Polish officials cease using the words "Ukraine" or "Ukrainian." The Polish army Generals believed that filling all state offices in Volhynia with ethnic Poles would ensure fast mobilization and prevent sabotage in case of a Russian attack on Poland. Ukrainians were systematically denied the opportunity to obtain government jobs. Local elected ethnic Ukrainian officials were relieved of their posts. Although the majority of the local population was Ukrainian, virtually all government official positions were assigned to Poles. Land reform designed to favour the Poles brought further alienation of the Ukrainian population.

Military colonists were settled in Volhynia to defend the border area against a Soviet incursion. Despite the ethnic Ukrainian lands being overpopulated and Ukrainian farmers being in need of land, the Polish government's land reforms gave land from large Polish estates not to local villagers but to Polish colonists. This number was estimated at 300,000 in both Galicia and Volhynia by Ukrainian sources and less than 100,000 by Polish sources (see osadnik)

Plans were made for a new round of colonization of Volhynia by Polish military veterans and Polish civilians and hundreds of new Roman Catholic churches were planned for the new colonists and for converts from Orthodoxy.

The ultimate result of Polish policies in Volhynia was that a sense of Ukrainian patriotism was created; however this patriotism was not tied to the Polish state. As a result of the anti-Ukrainian Polish policies, both Ukrainian nationalists and Communists found fertile ground for their ideas among the Volhynian Ukrainian population.

=== Religious and cultural policies ===
Following World War I, the government policy was initially aimed at limiting the influence of the predominantly Greek Catholic Ukrainians from Galicia on the Orthodox Ukrainians in Volhynia. A decree defending the rights of the Orthodox minorities was issued but often failed in practice, as the Roman Catholic Church, which had been persecuted under Tsarist rule and was eager to strengthen its position as well as to reclaim Catholic properties that had been confiscated and converted into Orthodox churches, had official representation in the Sejm (Polish parliament) and the courts. Eventually, a hundred ninety Orthodox churches were destroyed and often abandoned and another one hundred fifty were transformed into Roman Catholic churches. As a result, out of 389 Orthodox churches in Volhynia in 1914, only 51 remained in 1939. In addition to losing church buildings, the Orthodox Church lost large areas of land, which were taken the Polish state and kept by it, or given to the Roman Catholic Church. In the regions of Chelm and Polisia, armed groups of Polish colonists known as Krakus terrorized Ukrainian civilians into converting to Catholicism. Remaining Orthodox churches were forced to use the Polish language in their sermons. The last official government act of the Polish state in Volhynia was to, in August 1939, convert the last remaining Orthodox church in the Volhynian capital of Lutsk into a Roman Catholic one. The Orthodox clergy in Volhynia used the persecution of their church to build up already strong feelings of resentment among the local Ukrainian people against the Poles.

In contrast to the persecution experienced by the Orthodox Church, the Ukrainian Greek Catholic Church under respected by Polish authorities Metropolitan Andrey Sheptytsky was allowed to prosper in terms of intellectual and religious activities.

In Lviv, where Roman Catholics constituted in 1900 at least 52.5% of population, and 76.86% of citizens spoke Polish (although a portion of that population was Jewish), the Polish government sought to emphasize that city's Polish character by limiting the cultural expressions of that city's non-Polish minorities. Unlike in Austrian times, when the size and number of public parades or other cultural expressions such as parades or religious processions corresponded to each cultural group's relative population, during Polish rule limitations were placed on public displays of Jewish and Ukrainian culture. Celebrations, dedicated to the Polish defence of Lviv, became a major Polish public celebration, and were integrated by the Roman Catholic Church into the traditional All Saints' Day celebrations in early November. Military parades and commemorations of battles at particular streets within the city, all celebrating the Polish forces who fought against the Ukrainians in 1918, became frequent. The Polish government fostered the idea of Lviv as an eastern Polish outpost standing strong against eastern "hordes."

=== Attempts at normalization ===
After the OUN's assassination of Poland's minister of the interior in 1934 attempts were made at normalization between the government and the UNDO representatives led by Sheptytsky. Ukrainian dissidents were freed from Bereza, and credits were forwarded to Ukrainian cooperatives and economic institutions. However, the more radical Ukrainian nationalists rejected the rapprochement.

Between 1934 and 1938, a series of violent and sometimes deadly (as in Warsaw, with 2 victims) attacks against Ukrainians took place. In one of them in Warsaw dormitories in late 1938 – wrote Monsignor Philippe Cortesi – Polish police watched attacks of National Democracy's members on Ukrainian students and after the riots allegedly arrested the Ukrainian victims for disturbing the peace. In 1938–1939 a number of Ukrainian libraries and reading rooms were burned by Polish mobs of misguided patriotic youth who often went unpunished by the Polish police forces. Polish youths were organized into armed, local paramilitary Strzelcy groups and terrorized the Ukrainian population under the pretext of maintaining law and order, wrote Subtelny. Violent incidents went unreported in the Polish press according to Burds, and Ukrainian newspapers that discussed them were confiscated by the Polish authorities wherever they were found.

=== Education ===
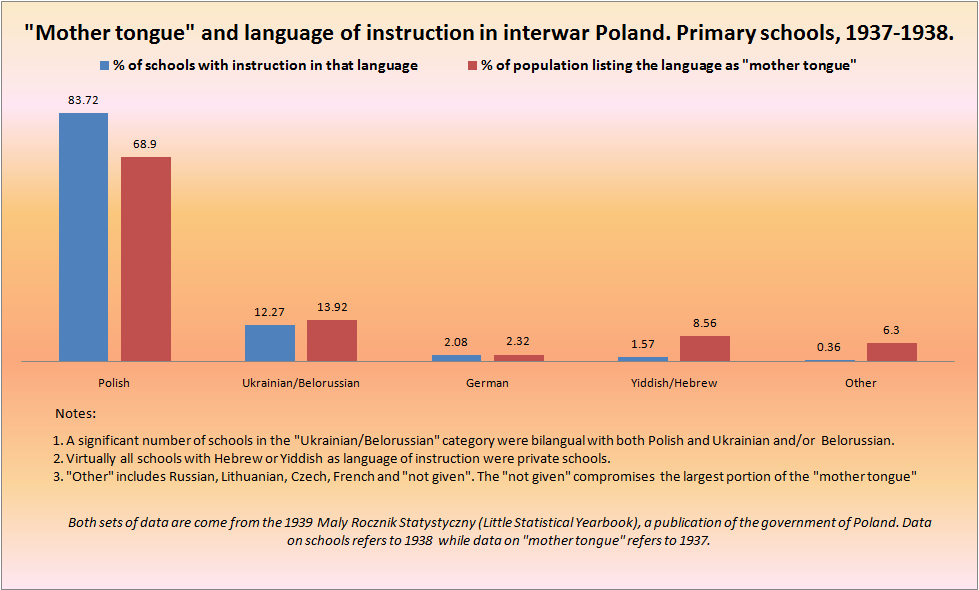
"Mother tongue" and language of instruction in Polish schools, 1937–1938. Many of the schools in the category "Ukrainian/Belarusian" were in fact bilingual, with Polish as also a language of instruction. The data is from the 1938 Statistical Yearbook of Poland. Click to enlarge.

In the Polish Second Republic's centralized model of government, decisions concerning education were made in Warsaw. Polish educational policies were geared towards bi-lingual schools. Ukrainian language usage was negatively impacted by the system. A law setting up bilingual Polish-Ukrainian schools and Polish schools, passed in 1924 by Władysław Grabski's government, led to closures of uni-lingual Ukrainian schools (their numbers decreased from 2,426 in 1922 to 352 in 1938 in Galicia; and from 443 in 1922 to 8 in 1938 in Volhynia) and their replacement by Polish-Ukrainian bilingual schools (2,485 in Galicia; 520 in Volhynia) and Polish schools. By the 1930s, a significant percentage of these "bilingual" schools became effectively Polish.

By 1938, Polish authorities increased the number of elementary schools in Volhynia and Polessia over three times to 3,100, and from 4,030 to 4,998 in Galicia Thus, in spite of such policies curbing the use of the Ukrainian language, the illiteracy rate in Ukrainian territories fell from 50 percent to 35 percent. Poland's policy also gave rise to the first generation of Ukrainian intellectual elite in Volhynia.

Ethnic Ukrainians were slightly underrepresented in the secondary education system. In the 1936/37 academic year 344 Ukrainians (13.3%) in comparison to 2599 Poles were enrolled in secondary school, in which Ukrainians were 13.9% of the population in the 1931 Polish census. Polish census figures undercounted the actual number of Ukrainians significantly, however, and a realistic estimate of the percentage of the Polish population who were ethnic Ukrainians was approximately 16 percent. In the 1938/9 academic year only 6 Ukrainians were accepted for tertiary education. Ethnic Ukrainians were largely restricted to be educated in the national language, Polish, rather than in their own language. In Poland, there was one Polish gymnasium for every 16,000 ethnic Poles but only one Ukrainian gymnasium for every 230,000 ethnic Ukrainians.

During the Habsburg era, Lviv had housed the largest and most influential Ukrainian institutions in the world. At the university, in 1919 Poland shut down all Ukrainian departments that had opened during the period of Austrian rule save for one, the 1848 Department of Ruthenian Language and Literature, whose chair position was allowed to remain vacant until 1927 before being filled by an ethnic Pole. Most Ukrainian professors were fired, and entrance of ethnic Ukrainians was restricted.

The Ukrainian community's reaction to the anti-Ukrainian educational policies of the Polish government was to create private institutions at its own expense. By the 1937–1938 school year, forty percent of Ukrainian gymnazium, teachers' college, and professional school students attended private schools. Donations from Ukrainian immigrants in Canada and the United States helped to financially support such schools. An underground university in Lviv (which had 1,500 students), and a Ukrainian Free University in Vienna (later moved to Prague) were established. Andrey Sheptytsky, head of the Ukrainian Greek Catholic Church, attempted to create a private Ukrainian Catholic University but his efforts were thwarted by the strong opposition of the Polish government, which threatened to cancel its Concordat with the Vatican if the Vatican were to recognize a Ukrainian university.

The University of Warsaw invited Ukrainian professors from Lviv and the Soviet Ukraine to its departments. In 1930, the Ukrainian Scientific Institute was established by the Polish government. By the outbreak of World War II, it became the largest among all émigré and Western Ukrainian academic publishers, and achieved the status of the main center of Taras Shevchenko studies in Europe. (Note: The Institute conducted in-depth scientific research into Ukrainian cultural history and was an organizer of over 50 scholarly conferences. It published tens of academic works, a series of major liturgical texts in Ukrainian translation, and an anthology of Taras Shevchenko in 13 volumes (3 more were planned).)

Ukrainians who after World War I found themselves under Polish rule were worse off than those in the new state of Czechoslovakia. In the region which became part of Czechoslovakia after World War I Ukrainian schools did not exist until the establishment of that country. However, by 1921–1922 89 percent of Ukrainian children were enrolled in Ukrainian-language schools.

The result of Poland's discriminatory educational policies against Ukrainians was that many educated Ukrainians became politically radicalized and militantly opposed to Poland.

=== Ukrainian responses to Polish governance ===
Olha Basarab, Ukrainian political activist, member of the executive of the Lviv branch of the Union of Ukrainian Women and Ukrainian Military Organization. Arrested after materials indicating cooperation with Germany's intelligence were found at her home, she died in prison in 1924. Different accounts of her death exist, from suicide to accusations of torture and murder

From the beginning and until the decision at Versailles to give eastern Galicia to Poland in 1923, the Galician Ukrainians considered Polish rule over lands primarily inhabited by them to be illegitimate, and they boycotted the Polish census of 1921 and the Polish elections of 1922. German-Jewish writer Alfred Döblin, travelling in eastern Galicia in 1924, expressed more sympathy for the Ukrainians under Polish rule than towards the Poles who dominated them. He described the Ukrainians' "terrible, blind, numb" hatred for the Poles. The largest Ukrainian political party in Poland, which dominated political life for the Ukrainian minority in that country, was the Ukrainian National Democratic Alliance (UNDO). UNDO supported constitutional democracy and focused on building up Ukrainian institutions, promoting Ukrainian education, and fostering Ukrainian self-reliance organizations that could operate independently from the Polish authorities in order to prepare Ukrainians for independence.

In contrast to the peaceful activities of the mainstream Ukrainian political party UNDO, the radical Organization of Ukrainian Nationalists sought to struggle against the Polish government through violence. The OUN carried out hundreds of acts of sabotage in Galicia and Volhynia, including a campaign of arson against Polish landowners (which helped provoke the 1930 Pacification), boycotts of state schools and Polish tobacco and liquor monopolies, dozens of expropriation attacks on government institutions to obtain funds for its activities, and approximately sixty assassinations. Some of the OUN's victims included Tadeusz Hołówko, a Polish promoter of Ukrainian/Polish compromise, Emilian Czechowski, Lviv's Polish police commissioner, Alexei Mailov, a Soviet consular official killed in retaliation for the Holodomor, and most notably Bronisław Pieracki, the Polish interior minister. The OUN also killed moderate Ukrainian figures such as the respected teacher (and former officer of the military of the West Ukrainian People's Republic) Ivan Babii, and in 1930 assaulted the head of the Shevchenko Scientific Society Kyrylo Studynsky in his office.

The OUN's terrorism was condemned by most mainstream Ukrainian political leaders. The head of the Ukrainian Greek Catholic Church, Metropolitan Andriy Sheptytsky, who was particularly critical of the OUN's leadership in exile who inspired acts of youthful violence, writing that they were "using our children to kill their parents" and that "whoever demoralizes our youth is a criminal and an enemy of the people." UNDO opposed acts of terrorism because they resulted in Polish retaliation against the Ukrainian population.

When Poland was partitioned by Germany and the Soviet Union, the overwhelming majority of Poland's ethnic Ukrainians were sincerely glad to see the Polish state collapse.

=== Demographics ===
The results of the 1931 census (questions about mother tongue and about religion) in voivodeships with significant Ukrainian populations:

Ukrainian/Ruthenian and Greek Catholic/Orthodox majority minority counties are highlighted with yellow.

Ukrainian and Polish population in voivodeships with significant Ukrainian population according to the 1931 census
| Today part of | County part of Voivodeship | County | Pop. | Ukrainian & Ruthenian | % | Polish | % | Uniate & Orthodox | % | Roman Catholic | % |
|---|---|---|---|---|---|---|---|---|---|---|---|
| (Ukraine) | Wołyń | Dubno | 226709 | 158173 | 69.8% | 33987 | 15.0% | 173512 | 76.5% | 27638 | 12.2% |
| (Ukraine) | Wołyń | Horokhiv | 122045 | 84224 | 69.0% | 21100 | 17.3% | 87333 | 71.6% | 17675 | 14.5% |
| (Ukraine) | Wołyń | Kostopil | 159602 | 105346 | 66.0% | 34951 | 21.9% | 103912 | 65.1% | 34450 | 21.6% |
| (Ukraine) | Wołyń | Kovel | 255095 | 185240 | 72.6% | 36720 | 14.4% | 187717 | 73.6% | 35191 | 13.8% |
| (Ukraine) | Wołyń | Kremenets | 243032 | 196000 | 80.6% | 25758 | 10.6% | 195233 | 80.3% | 25082 | 10.3% |
| (Ukraine) | Wołyń | Liuboml | 85507 | 65906 | 77.1% | 12150 | 14.2% | 65685 | 76.8% | 10998 | 12.9% |
| (Ukraine) | Wołyń | Lutsk | 290805 | 172038 | 59.2% | 56446 | 19.4% | 177377 | 61.0% | 55802 | 19.2% |
| (Ukraine) | Wołyń | Rivne | 252787 | 160484 | 63.5% | 36990 | 14.6% | 166970 | 66.1% | 36444 | 14.4% |
| (Ukraine) | Wołyń | Sarny | 181284 | 129637 | 71.5% | 30426 | 16.8% | 132691 | 73.2% | 28192 | 15.6% |
| (Ukraine) | Wołyń | Volodymyr | 150374 | 88174 | 58.6% | 40286 | 26.8% | 89641 | 59.6% | 38483 | 25.6% |
| (Ukraine) | Wołyń | Zdolbuniv | 118334 | 81650 | 69.0% | 17826 | 15.1% | 86948 | 73.5% | 17901 | 15.1% |
| Total in Wołyń Voivodeship | | | 2085574 | 1426872 | 68.4% | 346640 | 16.6% | 1467019 | 70.3% | 327856 | 15.7% |
| (Ukraine) | Tarnopol | Borshchiv | 103277 | 52612 | 50.9% | 46153 | 44.7% | 65344 | 63.3% | 28432 | 27.5% |
| (Ukraine) | Tarnopol | Brody | 91248 | 50490 | 55.3% | 32843 | 36.0% | 58009 | 63.6% | 22521 | 24.7% |
| (Ukraine) | Tarnopol | Berezhany | 103824 | 51757 | 49.9% | 48168 | 46.4% | 54611 | 52.6% | 41962 | 40.4% |
| (Ukraine) | Tarnopol | Buchach | 139062 | 70336 | 50.6% | 60523 | 43.5% | 77023 | 55.4% | 51311 | 36.9% |
| (Ukraine) | Tarnopol | Chortkiv | 84008 | 40866 | 48.6% | 36486 | 43.4% | 42828 | 51.0% | 33080 | 39.4% |
| (Ukraine) | Tarnopol | Kamianka-Buzka | 82111 | 35178 | 42.8% | 41693 | 50.8% | 45113 | 54.9% | 29828 | 36.3% |
| (Ukraine) | Tarnopol | Kopychyntsi | 88614 | 45196 | 51.0% | 38158 | 43.1% | 50007 | 56.4% | 31202 | 35.2% |
| (Ukraine) | Tarnopol | Pidhaitsi | 95663 | 45031 | 47.1% | 46710 | 48.8% | 52634 | 55.0% | 38003 | 39.7% |
| (Ukraine) | Tarnopol | Peremyshliany | 89908 | 32777 | 36.5% | 52269 | 58.1% | 44002 | 48.9% | 38475 | 42.8% |
| (Ukraine) | Tarnopol | Radekhiv | 69313 | 39970 | 57.7% | 25427 | 36.7% | 42928 | 61.9% | 17945 | 25.9% |
| (Ukraine) | Tarnopol | Skalat | 89215 | 25369 | 28.4% | 60091 | 67.4% | 34798 | 39.0% | 45631 | 51.1% |
| (Ukraine) | Tarnopol | Ternopil | 142220 | 42374 | 29.8% | 93874 | 66.0% | 60979 | 42.9% | 63286 | 44.5% |
| (Ukraine) | Tarnopol | Terebovlia | 84321 | 30868 | 36.6% | 50178 | 59.5% | 40452 | 48.0% | 38979 | 46.2% |
| (Ukraine) | Tarnopol | Zalishchyky | 72021 | 41147 | 57.1% | 27549 | 38.3% | 48069 | 66.7% | 17917 | 24.9% |
| (Ukraine) | Tarnopol | Zbarazh | 65579 | 29609 | 45.2% | 32740 | 49.9% | 36468 | 55.6% | 24855 | 37.9% |
| (Ukraine) | Tarnopol | Zboriv | 81413 | 39174 | 48.1% | 39624 | 48.7% | 49925 | 61.3% | 26239 | 32.2% |
| (Ukraine) | Tarnopol | Zolochiv | 118609 | 55381 | 46.7% | 56628 | 47.7% | 70663 | 59.6% | 36937 | 31.1% |
| Total in Tarnopol Voivodeship | | | 1600406 | 728135 | 46.2% | 789114 | 49.3% | 873853 | 54.6% | 586603 | 36.7% |
| (Ukraine) | Stanisławów | Dolyna | 118373 | 83880 | 70.9% | 21158 | 17.9% | 89811 | 75.9% | 15630 | 13.2% |
| (Ukraine) | Stanisławów | Horodenka | 92894 | 59957 | 64.5% | 27751 | 29.9% | 69789 | 75.1% | 15519 | 16.7% |
| (Ukraine) | Stanisławów | Kalush | 102252 | 77506 | 75.8% | 18637 | 18.2% | 80750 | 79.0% | 14418 | 14.1% |
| (Ukraine) | Stanisławów | Kolomyia | 176000 | 110533 | 62.8% | 52006 | 29.5% | 121376 | 69.0% | 31925 | 18.1% |
| (Ukraine) | Stanisławów | Kosiv | 93952 | 79838 | 85.0% | 6718 | 7.2% | 80903 | 86.1% | 4976 | 5.3% |
| (Ukraine) | Stanisławów | Nadvírna | 140702 | 112128 | 79.7% | 16907 | 12.0% | 113116 | 80.4% | 15214 | 10.8% |
| (Ukraine) | Stanisławów | Rohatyn | 127252 | 84875 | 66.7% | 36152 | 28.4% | 90456 | 71.1% | 27108 | 21.3% |
| (Ukraine) | Stanisławów | Stanyslaviv | 198359 | 120214 | 60.6% | 49032 | 24.7% | 123959 | 62.5% | 42519 | 21.4% |
| (Ukraine) | Stanisławów | Stryi | 152631 | 106183 | 69.6% | 25186 | 16.5% | 108159 | 70.9% | 23404 | 15.3% |
| (Ukraine) | Stanisławów | Sniatyn | 78025 | 56007 | 71.8% | 17206 | 22.1% | 61797 | 79.2% | 8659 | 11.1% |
| (Ukraine) | Stanisławów | Tlumach | 116028 | 66659 | 57.5% | 44958 | 38.7% | 76650 | 66.1% | 31478 | 27.1% |
| (Ukraine) | Stanisławów | Zhydachiv | 83817 | 61098 | 72.9% | 16464 | 19.6% | 63144 | 75.3% | 15094 | 18.0% |
| Total in Stanisławów Voivodeship | | | 1480285 | 1018878 | 68.8% | 332175 | 22.4% | 1079910 | 73.0% | 245944 | 16.6% |
| (Ukraine) | Lwów | Bibrka | 97124 | 60444 | 62.2% | 30762 | 31.7% | 66113 | 68.1% | 22820 | 23.5% |
| (Poland) | Lwów | Brzozów | 83205 | 10677 | 12.8% | 68149 | 81.9% | 12743 | 15.3% | 65813 | 79.1% |
| (Ukraine) | Lwów | Dobromyl | 93970 | 52463 | 55.8% | 35945 | 38.3% | 59664 | 63.5% | 25941 | 27.6% |
| (Ukraine) | Lwów | Drohobych | 194456 | 79214 | 40.7% | 91935 | 47.3% | 110850 | 57.0% | 52172 | 26.8% |
| (Ukraine) | Lwów | Horodok | 85007 | 47812 | 56.2% | 33228 | 39.1% | 56713 | 66.7% | 22408 | 26.4% |
| (Poland) | Lwów | Jarosław | 148028 | 20993 | 14.2% | 120429 | 81.4% | 52302 | 35.3% | 83652 | 56.5% |
| (Ukraine) | Lwów | Yavoriv | 86762 | 55868 | 64.4% | 26938 | 31.0% | 62828 | 72.4% | 18394 | 21.2% |
| (Poland) | Lwów | Kolbuszowa | 69565 | 62 | 0.1% | 65361 | 94.0% | 91 | 0.1% | 63999 | 92.0% |
| (Poland) | Lwów | Krosno | 113387 | 14666 | 12.9% | 93691 | 82.6% | 15132 | 13.3% | 91189 | 80.4% |
| (Poland) | Lwów | Lesko | 111575 | 70346 | 63.0% | 31840 | 28.5% | 81588 | 73.1% | 18209 | 16.3% |
| (Poland) | Lwów | Lubaczów | 87266 | 38237 | 43.8% | 43294 | 49.6% | 44723 | 51.2% | 32994 | 37.8% |
| (Ukraine) | Lwów | Lviv City | 312231 | 35137 | 11.3% | 198212 | 63.5% | 50824 | 16.3% | 157490 | 50.4% |
| (Ukraine) | Lwów | Lviv County | 142800 | 58395 | 40.9% | 80712 | 56.5% | 67592 | 47.3% | 67430 | 47.2% |
| (Poland) | Lwów | Łańcut | 97679 | 2690 | 2.8% | 92084 | 94.3% | 4806 | 4.9% | 86066 | 88.1% |
| (Ukraine) | Lwów | Mostyska | 89460 | 37196 | 41.6% | 49989 | 55.9% | 49230 | 55.0% | 34619 | 38.7% |
| (Poland) | Lwów | Nisko | 64233 | 115 | 0.2% | 60602 | 94.3% | 925 | 1.4% | 59069 | 92.0% |
| (Poland) | Lwów | Przemyśl | 162544 | 60005 | 36.9% | 86393 | 53.2% | 73631 | 45.3% | 67068 | 41.3% |
| (Poland) | Lwów | Przeworsk | 61388 | 406 | 0.7% | 58634 | 95.5% | 3042 | 5.0% | 54833 | 89.3% |
| (Ukraine) | Lwów | Rava-Ruska | 122072 | 82133 | 67.3% | 27376 | 22.4% | 84808 | 69.5% | 22489 | 18.4% |
| (Ukraine) | Lwów | Rudky | 79170 | 36254 | 45.8% | 38417 | 48.5% | 45756 | 57.8% | 27674 | 35.0% |
| (Poland) | Lwów | Rzeszów | 185106 | 963 | 0.5% | 173897 | 93.9% | 3277 | 1.8% | 164050 | 88.6% |
| (Ukraine) | Lwów | Sambir | 133814 | 68222 | 51.0% | 56818 | 42.5% | 78527 | 58.7% | 43583 | 32.6% |
| (Poland) | Lwów | Sanok | 114195 | 38192 | 33.4% | 67955 | 59.5% | 54882 | 48.1% | 48968 | 42.9% |
| (Ukraine) | Lwów | Sokal | 109111 | 59984 | 55.0% | 42851 | 39.3% | 69963 | 64.1% | 25425 | 23.3% |
| (Poland) | Lwów | Tarnobrzeg | 73297 | 93 | 0.1% | 67624 | 92.3% | 194 | 0.3% | 65891 | 89.9% |
| (Ukraine) | Lwów | Turka | 114457 | 80483 | 70.3% | 26083 | 22.8% | 97339 | 85.0% | 6301 | 5.5% |
| (Ukraine) | Lwów | Zhovkva | 95507 | 56060 | 58.7% | 35816 | 37.5% | 66823 | 70.0% | 20279 | 21.2% |
| Total in Lwów Voivodeship | | | 3127409 | 1067110 | 34.1% | 1805035 | 57.7% | 1314366 | 42.0% | 1448826 | 46.3% |
| (Poland) | Kraków | Biała | 139127 | 48 | 0.0% | 127089 | 91.3% | 197 | 0.1% | 126431 | 90.9% |
| (Poland) | Kraków | Bochnia | 113790 | 75 | 0.1% | 109717 | 96.4% | 134 | 0.1% | 107399 | 94.4% |
| (Poland) | Kraków | Brzesko | 102226 | 20 | 0.0% | 100251 | 98.1% | 66 | 0.1% | 97730 | 95.6% |
| (Poland) | Kraków | Chrzanów | 138061 | 88 | 0.1% | 127078 | 92.0% | 240 | 0.2% | 125016 | 90.6% |
| (Poland) | Kraków | Dąbrowa | 66678 | 25 | 0.0% | 62620 | 93.9% | 36 | 0.1% | 61584 | 92.4% |
| (Poland) | Kraków | Gorlice | 104805 | 24881 | 23.7% | 76266 | 72.8% | 25092 | 23.9% | 73788 | 70.4% |
| (Poland) | Kraków | Jasło | 116146 | 7435 | 6.4% | 103935 | 89.5% | 7659 | 6.6% | 102213 | 88.0% |
| (Poland) | Kraków | Kraków City | 219286 | 924 | 0.4% | 171206 | 78.1% | 1894 | 0.9% | 159372 | 72.7% |
| (Poland) | Kraków | Kraków County | 187509 | 97 | 0.1% | 185567 | 99.0% | 309 | 0.2% | 181836 | 97.0% |
| (Poland) | Kraków | Limanowa | 87279 | 29 | 0.0% | 85238 | 97.7% | 43 | 0.0% | 84048 | 96.3% |
| (Poland) | Kraków | Mielec | 77465 | 48 | 0.1% | 71272 | 92.0% | 72 | 0.1% | 69737 | 90.0% |
| (Poland) | Kraków | Myślenice | 102692 | 16 | 0.0% | 101878 | 99.2% | 32 | 0.0% | 99978 | 97.4% |
| (Poland) | Kraków | Nowy Sącz | 183867 | 24252 | 13.2% | 148329 | 80.7% | 25060 | 13.6% | 141857 | 77.2% |
| (Poland) | Kraków | Nowy Targ | 129489 | 2156 | 1.7% | 123877 | 95.7% | 2296 | 1.8% | 121767 | 94.0% |
| (Poland) | Kraków | Ropczyce | 110925 | 60 | 0.1% | 105700 | 95.3% | 136 | 0.1% | 104033 | 93.8% |
| (Poland) | Kraków | Tarnów | 142365 | 102 | 0.1% | 124817 | 87.7% | 293 | 0.2% | 120610 | 84.7% |
| (Poland) | Kraków | Wadowice | 145143 | 53 | 0.0% | 142852 | 98.4% | 125 | 0.1% | 140469 | 96.8% |
| (Poland) | Kraków | Żywiec | 130949 | 19 | 0.0% | 129747 | 99.1% | 71 | 0.1% | 127685 | 97.5% |
| Total in Kraków Voivodeship | | | 2297802 | 60328 | 2.6% | 2097439 | 91.3% | 63755 | 2.8% | 2045553 | 89.0% |
| (Poland) | Lublin | Biała Podlaska | 116266 | 2250 | 1.9% | 106467 | 91.6% | 18715 | 16.1% | 82647 | 71.1% |
| (Poland) | Lublin | Biłgoraj | 116951 | 2727 | 2.3% | 106100 | 90.7% | 21055 | 18.0% | 82614 | 70.6% |
| (Poland) | Lublin | Chełm | 162340 | 13103 | 8.1% | 120805 | 74.4% | 37875 | 23.3% | 88488 | 54.5% |
| (Poland) | Lublin | Garwolin | 159942 | 68 | 0.0% | 140024 | 87.5% | 147 | 0.1% | 139128 | 87.0% |
| (Poland) | Lublin | Hrubieszów | 129957 | 19066 | 14.7% | 101394 | 78.0% | 49802 | 38.3% | 63365 | 48.8% |
| (Poland) | Lublin | Janów | 152718 | 1009 | 0.7% | 142113 | 93.1% | 1206 | 0.8% | 135182 | 88.5% |
| (Poland) | Lublin | Krasnystaw | 134159 | 1054 | 0.8% | 123204 | 91.8% | 4886 | 3.6% | 113442 | 84.6% |
| (Poland) | Lublin | Lubartów | 107991 | 628 | 0.6% | 99918 | 92.5% | 1583 | 1.5% | 94356 | 87.4% |
| (Poland) | Lublin | Lublin City | 112285 | 227 | 0.2% | 73534 | 65.5% | 863 | 0.8% | 71542 | 63.7% |
| (Poland) | Lublin | Lublin County | 163502 | 57 | 0.0% | 151946 | 92.9% | 186 | 0.1% | 149192 | 91.2% |
| (Poland) | Lublin | Łuków | 129083 | 28 | 0.0% | 120991 | 93.7% | 118 | 0.1% | 113549 | 88.0% |
| (Poland) | Lublin | Puławy | 172267 | 133 | 0.1% | 150022 | 87.1% | 308 | 0.2% | 149060 | 86.5% |
| (Poland) | Lublin | Radzyń | 99089 | 326 | 0.3% | 84174 | 84.9% | 1874 | 1.9% | 80520 | 81.3% |
| (Poland) | Lublin | Siedlce | 151411 | 132 | 0.1% | 129414 | 85.5% | 709 | 0.5% | 125018 | 82.6% |
| (Poland) | Lublin | Sokołów | 83949 | 39 | 0.0% | 75376 | 89.8% | 176 | 0.2% | 74941 | 89.3% |
| (Poland) | Lublin | Tomaszów | 121124 | 20752 | 17.1% | 86612 | 71.5% | 33642 | 27.8% | 73021 | 60.3% |
| (Poland) | Lublin | Węgrów | 88788 | 34 | 0.0% | 79709 | 89.8% | 83 | 0.1% | 76511 | 86.2% |
| (Poland) | Lublin | Włodawa | 113566 | 9663 | 8.5% | 86866 | 76.5% | 33585 | 29.6% | 57939 | 51.0% |
| (Poland) | Lublin | Zamość | 149548 | 2532 | 1.7% | 130530 | 87.3% | 6942 | 4.6% | 125249 | 83.8% |
| Total in Lublin Voivodeship | | | 2464936 | 73828 | 3.0% | 2109199 | 85.6% | 213755 | 8.7% | 1895764 | 76.9% |
| Total in six voivodeships | | | 13056412 | 4375151 | 33.6% | 7479602 | 57.3% | 5012658 | 38.4% | 6550546 | 50.2% |

In total in these six voivodeships the census counted 4,375,151 people with Ukrainian or Ruthenian mother tongue. In the rest of inter-war Poland there were further 66,471 people with Ukrainian or Ruthenian mother tongue, for a grand total of 4,441,622 in entire Poland.

== World War II ==
In 1939 Poland was occupied by Germany and the Soviet Union, the mostly Ukrainian-inhabited territories of Volhynia and Galicia were annexed by the Soviet Union. Some territories inhabited by Ukrainians, however, were placed under German control. In these areas, Ukrainian cultural activities such as theaters, schools and reading rooms that had been suppressed by the Polish government were reestablished. Approximately twenty Ukrainian churches were revived.

During World War II the Ukrainian Central Committee (UCC), which was the officially recognized Ukrainian community and quasi-political organization under the German occupation, was founded and based in Kraków. It was responsible for social services, veteran affairs, education, youth and economic activities. For example, after a flood and famine in Transcarpathia, the committee was able to save and resettle 30,000 Ukrainian children. By late 1943 it operated 1,366 kitchens and was able to feed 100,000 people. The committee's interventions led to the release of 85,000 ethnic Ukrainian prisoners-of-war (presumably, from the Polish military) who were captured during the German-Polish conflict. It was unable, however, to intervene in the brutal treatment of Ukrainian prisoners who had fought in the Soviet military. When the Germans began to kill Ukrainian peasants in the Zamość region for alleged resistance, Kubiyovych's protest to Hans Frank was able to halt that slaughter. The committee was also able to build student residences housing 7,000 students, provided scholarships worth 1.35 million zlotys, and organized over 100 youth groups, camps and sports clubs.

A Ukrainian Publishing House was established in Kraków. It published numerous Ukrainian works and textbooks. In spite of problems with German censors and chronic paper shortages, the Ukrainian Publishing House also published a Ukrainian daily newspaper.

Ukrainian-populated territories that had been part of Poland were the scene of extreme violence between Ukrainians and Poles. During World War II, Ukrainian nationalists killed between 40,000 and 60,000 Polish civilians in the former Polish territory of Volhynia and between 25,000 to 30,000–40,000 in the former Polish territory of Eastern Galicia The number of Ukrainian civilians killed in reprisal attacks by Poles is estimated at 10,000–20,000 in all territories covered by the conflict (including south-eastern areas of present-day Poland).

See: Organization of Ukrainian Nationalists, Proclamation of Ukrainian statehood, 1941 and massacres of Poles in Volhynia.

== After World War II ==
After the quashing of a Ukrainian insurrection at the end of World War II by the Soviet Union, about 140,000 Ukrainians remaining in Poland were forcibly expelled to Soviet Ukraine, and to new territories in northern and western Poland during Operation Vistula.

In Podlachia, many speakers of Ukrainian language started identifying as Belarusians or adopted Roman Catholicism in order to evade deportation. Even many locals who retained their religion adopted the identity of "Orthodox Poles". According to local law, bilingual Polish-Belarusian road signs have been installed in Podlachian Voivodeship, but all attempts to place Ukrainian language signs as well have been prevented by authorities. In Dubicze Cerkiewne the local Ukrainian community has been organizing a folk music festival.

Since 1989, there has been a new wave of Ukrainian immigration to Poland, mostly consisting of jobseekers. According to data reported by the Ukrainian Ministry of Foreign Affairs in the 2000s, around 300,000 Ukrainian citizens were employed in Poland annually. In recent years, the number of Ukrainian immigrants in Poland has grown considerably, numbering 1.3 million in 2016.

== See also ==
- Historical demography of Poland
- Ukrainian minority in Poland
- Pacification of Ukrainians in Eastern Galicia (1930)
- Massacres of Poles in Volhynia and Eastern Galicia (1943-1945)

== Bibliography ==
- Subtelny, Orest (1988). Ukraine: A History. Toronto: University of Toronto Press. ISBN 0-8020-5808-6.
- Wiktor Poliszczuk "Bitter truth": The criminality of the Organization of Ukrainian Nationalists (OUN) and the Ukrainian Insurgent Army (UPA), the testimony of a Ukrainian, ISBN 0-9699444-9-7
- Andrzej L. Sowa (1998). Stosunki polsko-ukraińskie 1939–1947 (in Polish). Kraków. OCLC 48053561.
