= Fifth Term Sejm (Second Polish Republic) =

Parliament of Poland

The Fifth Term Sejm (parliament) of the Second Polish Republic was formed after the general election, which took place on November 6, 1938, with previous, Fourth Term Sejm, having been dissolved on September 13, 1938. It was the last assembly of interwar Poland, ending its activity in September 1939, due to German Invasion of Poland. On November 2, 1939, President Władysław Raczkiewicz formally dissolved the Fifth Term Sejm, replacing it on December 9, 1939 with National Council of the Polish Republic (Rada Narodowa Rzeczypospolitej Polskiej).

The Marshal of the Sejm was Wacław Makowski, while his deputies were Vasyl Mudry (Ukrainian minority), Zygmunt Wenda, Wacław Długosz, Jan Henryk Jedynak and Leon Surzyński.
