= Ukrainian National Democratic Alliance =

Ukrainian National Democratic Alliance Українське національно-демократичне об'єднання Ukraińskie Zjednoczenie Narodowo-Demokratyczne
- Founded: 1925
- Dissolved: 1939
- Merger of: Ukrainian Labor Party and Ukrainian Party of National Work
- Preceded by: Ukrainian National Democratic Party
- Headquarters: Lviv
- Ideology: Anti-communism; Christian democracy Ukrainian nationalism
- Political position: Centre-right

Party flag

The Ukrainian National Democratic Alliance (UNDO; Ukrainian: Українське національно-демократичне об'єднання (УНДО), romanized: Ukrayins'ke natsional'no-demokratichne ob"yednannya; Polish: Ukraińskie Zjednoczenie Narodowo-Demokratyczne, UZND) was the largest Ukrainian political party in the Second Polish Republic, active in Western Ukraine. It dominated the mainstream political life of the Ukrainian minority in Poland, which with almost 14% of Poland's population was the largest minority.

UNDO was founded in 1925 and dissolved during the Soviet annexation of western Ukraine in 1939. Throughout the interwar years, UNDO enjoyed both German and Soviet financial support.

== Political programme ==
UNDO like other western Ukrainian political parties considered Polish rule over current western Ukraine to be illegitimate, advocating the independence of western Ukraine. UNDO sought to promote Ukrainians' well-being within the Polish state until independence could be achieved. As such, it opposed the terrorism and violence of the Organization of Ukrainian Nationalists, as such actions resulted in negative repercussions on the Ukrainian population. UNDO was essentially democratic in nature, guided by varying amounts of Catholic, liberal, and socialist ideology.

UNDO supported constitutional democracy and the "organic development" of Ukrainian society that would prepare it for independence once the opportunity arose. The approach of "organic development" focused on building up Ukrainian institutions, promoting Ukrainian education, and fostering Ukrainian self-reliance organizations that could operate independently from the Polish authorities. In so doing, UNDO hoped to achieve through peaceful means that which was not attained through war. UNDO supported agrarian reform and the development and expansion of the Ukrainian cooperative movement, particularly agricultural and financial cooperatives. UNDO also maintained close relations with the Ukrainian Greek Catholic Church. Ukrainian women's organizations actively participated in UNDO, which sent a woman representative to the Ukrainian parliament where she attained the position of party spokesperson.

UNDO pursued a dual policy with respect to Poland's next largest minority, the Jews. UNDO protested acts of antisemitism and cooperated with Jewish representatives in the Polish parliament. It supported Jewish civil rights and fought against Polish attempts to limit Jewish cultural practices. For example, UNDO's representatives in the Polish parliament joined their Jewish colleagues in voting against an attempt to limit kosher slaughtering. UNDO's support for the Jews was largely driven by the belief that actions against Jews would set a precedent for future discrimination against Ukrainians. Following a Polish pogrom against Jews in 1936, an UNDO leader published an article called "After the Jews Will Come Our Turn." Despite its rejection of violence and discrimination against Jews, UNDO also engaged in an economic struggle against them by supporting Ukrainian cooperatives through boycotting non-Ukrainian (and thus, often, Jewish) businesses. While rejecting Polish offers of cooperation against Jews, UNDO spokesmen also blamed Jews for spreading Communism in Ukrainian villages.

Seeing Poland as the main enemy, in the 1920s while Soviet Ukraine was experiencing a cultural revival, a significant segment of the UNDO leadership had a pro-Soviet orientation. Dmytro Levytsky, party leader, wrote in 1925, "We are firmly convinced that, much like abstract communism, the Soviet form of government is alien to the mindset of the Ukrainian nation. But as we register facts, we cannot make note of certain facts while ignoring others. Therefore, we state the well-known and unquestionable fact that the national idea is growing, strengthening, and developing in Soviet Ukraine." After Ukrainization ended, and news of Soviet crimes devastating Ukrainian society in the 1930s (such as the Holodomor and Executed Renaissance) filtered into western Ukraine, UNDO radically altered its position towards the Soviet Union, coming to consider it the principal enemy of Ukraine. With this in mind, UNDO's programme evolved into seeking a new understanding with Poland. This alienated some of its supporters and brought it into conflict with the Organization of Ukrainian Nationalists.

== History ==
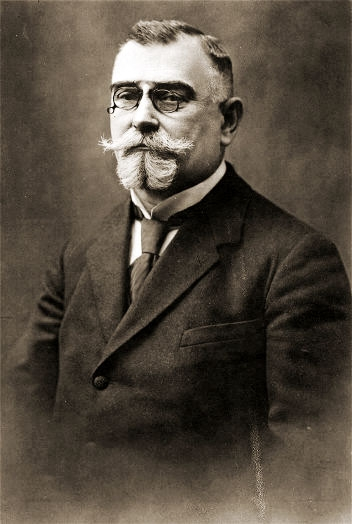
Kost Levytsky

UNDO was founded at a party congress in 1925 through the merger of three western Ukrainian political parties, under the leadership of Dmytro Levytsky. It was the direct descendant of the prewar Ukrainian National Democratic Party, which had been the leading western Ukrainian political party during Austrian rule through western Ukraine's failed war of independence against Poland. The vast majority of western Ukraine's intelligentsia and clergy were members of UNDO. Prominent figures in the party included Kost Levytsky, former head of the government of the West Ukrainian National Republic, Dmytro Levytsky, who led the party for ten years, and Vasyl Mudry, who would become the speaker of Poland's parliament (the Sejm). UNDO's members controlled many of the region's Ukrainian financial, cooperative, and cultural institutions, including the principal western Ukrainian newspaper Dilo. During the elections, it obtained approximately 600,000 votes and a large majority of the Ukrainian seats in the Polish parliament. Its main competitor within the Ukrainian community, the socialist Ukrainian Radical Party, received 280,000 votes.

In 1930, in response to terrorist activities of the Organization of Ukrainian Nationalists, Poland initiated a policy referred to as Pacification, which involved mass arrests and beatings of Ukrainian activists, burning down of Ukrainian reading rooms and cooperatives, and closing of Ukrainian private schools. UNDO's representatives in the Polish parliament led the Ukrainian delegation in sponsoring a motion condemning these acts. After the motion's rejection, the Ukrainian parliamentarians appealed to the League of Nations, which reprimanded the Polish government. During the parliamentary elections of that year, the Polish government tried to deter the Ukrainian people from voting for Ukrainian parties. UNDO formed a temporary coalition with the other Ukrainian parties that won 21 seats in the House of deputies (17 of which were held by UNDO) and four seats in the Senate (3 of which were held by UNDO). Despite UNDO's presence in the parliament, anti-Ukrainian actions by the Polish state accelerated. Laws were passed that stipulated that only people who could speak and write Polish could serve as county or city officials, and four-fifths of Ukrainian judges were removed from their positions or transferred to Central and Western Poland.

By 1932, the relentless Polish pressure combined with the perception, based in part on the Holodomor and other Soviet atrocities affecting the Ukrainian population, that the Soviet Union, not Poland was Ukraine's principal enemy, induced many UNDO's leaders to seek some sort of accommodation with the Polish government. In March 1935, UNDO reached a compromise with the Polish government known as "Normalization." In exchange for UNDO agreeing to work with the Polish government, Ukrainians were guaranteed nineteen seats total in both houses of the Polish parliament, as well as the position of vice-marshal (speaker) of the Polish parliament, many Ukrainian political prisoners were amnestied, and credits were given to Ukrainian cooperatives. Russophile representation was also eliminated, and the status quo in Ukrainian schooling was maintained.

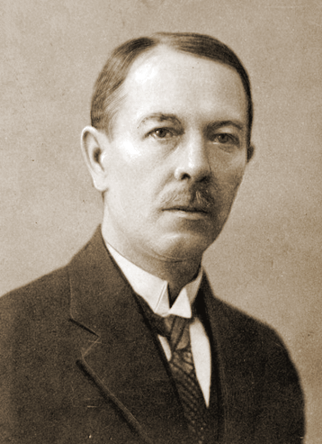
Dmytro Levytsky, party leader from 1925 to 1935

UNDO's efforts to reach an agreement with the Polish government led to fractures within the party. In 1933 a group of UNDO members led by Dmytro Paliiv left UNDO to form another party that was uncompromisingly opposed to both Poland as well as the Soviet Union. Although this new party was more nationalistic and authoritarian, it was legal and continued UNDO's opposition to the terrorism of the Organization of Ukrainian Nationalists. Because the Poles were only willing to apply concessions to Galicia, and not to Volhynia, UNDO's leader Dmytro Levytsky resigned from his post as head of the party. While not resigning from the party itself, he went into internal opposition. Levytsky was supported by many of UNDO's members and by the editorial board of the newspaper Dilo. This split incapacitated the party. Levytsky was replaced as head of the party by Vasyl Mudry, who became speaker of the Polish parliament.

During Normalization, UNDO pressed the Polish government for more substantial changes, such as cultural autonomy in western Ukraine, improvement in elementary and secondary education, a Ukrainian university, self-government, elimination of Polish colonization of Ukrainian lands, more access to administrative positions within the Polish state, and others. These demands were generally ignored by the Polish authorities, which led to a loss of credibility for Normalization among many Ukrainians. As a result, in 1938 UNDO proclaimed that Normalization had failed and that Poland opposed Ukrainian political life; it once again demanded autonomy for Poland's Ukrainian minority. At the same time, Germany's puppet government in Czechoslovakia granted autonomy to Slovakia's ethnic Ukrainian region, Carpatho-Ukraine. When in December 1938 articles began to appear in the German press supporting a Ukrainian state that would include parts of Poland, UNDO's leader informed the German ambassador in Warsaw that he saw no hopes for Polish-Ukrainian cooperation and that he hoped for German support. As a result, Poland pressed Germany to allow Hungary to annex Carpatho-Ukraine and when Hungary did so in 1939 Poland exploited Ukrainian disappointment in order to improve relations, and once again promised autonomy.

When Germany invaded Poland, UNDO declared its loyalty to the Polish state. After the Soviets annexed Eastern Poland, UNDO's former leader, Dr. Dmytro Levitsky, who had once been chief of the Ukrainian delegation in the pre-war Polish parliament, as well as many of his colleagues, were arrested, deported to Moscow, and never heard from again. UNDO along with all other legal Ukrainian political parties was forced by the Soviet authorities to disband. As a result, the Organization of Ukrainian Nationalists (OUN), which already had an underground structure dating to its time of conflict with the Polish authorities, was left as the sole functioning, independent, political organization in western Ukraine.

== Electoral results ==
=== Second Polish Republic ===
Sejm
Year	Popular vote	%	Seats	Seat change	Government	Notes
1928	600,000	?	21 / 444	new	opposition	As part of Bloc of National Minorities
1930	?	?	17 / 444	-4	opposition	As part of Ukrainian and Belarusian Electoral Bloc
1935	?	?	13 / 206	-4	Minority support	As part of Bloc of National Minorities
1938	?	?	12 / 208	-1	opposition	Part of Ukrainian Group

Senate
Year	Popular vote	%	Seats	Seat change	Government	Notes
1928	?	?	9 / 111	new	opposition	As part of Bloc of National Minorities
1930	?	?	3 / 111	-6	opposition	As part of Ukrainian and Belarusian Electoral Bloc
1935	?	?	4 / 96	+1	Minority support	As part of Bloc of National Minorities
1938	?	?	3 / 96	-1	opposition	Part of Ukrainian Group

== See also ==
- Bloc of National Minorities
- National Democracy (Ukraine)
