= Ukrainian Scientific Institute =

Historical research centre in Warsaw

The Ukrainian Scientific Institute in Warsaw (Polish: Ukraiński Instytut Naukowy w Warszawie, Ukrainian: Український науковий Інститут у Варшаві) was an academic research center and a publisher operating in the Second Polish Republic. The institute was founded by the Polish government. Its director was Oleksander Hnatovych Lotots’kyi (1870–1939), Ukrainian political and civil activist, scholar and professor of Theological Law at the Ukrainian Free University in Prague. He came to Poland in 1929 to serve at the history department of the Warsaw University. The Ukrainian Scientific Institute published the works of Taras Shevchenko in 14 volumes (16 planned) under Lotots’kyi direction, the series of major liturgical volumes in first ever Ukrainian translation, as well as the congenial translation of Pan Tadeusz by the Ukrainian poet Maksym Rylski, awarded doctor honoris causa of the Jagiellonian University as a result of it. The Institute conducted research into Ukrainian cultural history, broadly construed.
