= Serhy Yekelchyk =

Canadian-Ukrainian historian

Serhy Yekelchyk (Ukrainian: Сергій Єкельчик, romanized: Serhiy Yekelchyk; born November 13, 1966, in Kyiv) is a Ukrainian Canadian historian, who has published widely on modern Ukrainian and Russian history and Russian-Ukrainian relations.

== Education and career ==
Yekelchyk received his B.A. from the University of Kyiv and his M.A. from the Ukrainian Academy of Sciences. He conducted research in Australia in the early 1990s, then moved to Edmonton to complete his Ph.D. at the University of Alberta in 2000. He was a postdoctoral fellow and visiting assistant professor at the University of Michigan the following year. Since 2001, he has taught at the University of Victoria, British Columbia, Canada. He currently serves as president of the Canadian Association of Ukrainian Studies.

== Research interests ==
Much of Yekelchyk's recent work focuses on Stalinist culture and political life, especially in the Ukrainian Soviet Socialist Republic. He has also written about Soviet nationalities policy and about Ukrainian national identity from the late nineteenth century to the present. His book Ukraine: Birth of a Modern Nation was the first historical survey to include the 2004 Orange Revolution and has since been translated into five languages.

Yekelchuk contributes articles to various printed and online journals, including: The Wall Street Journal, Yahoo News, OUPblog, POLITICO, The Times Literary Supplement, RealClear World, RealClear History, and ThePioneer Briefing.

== Selected bibliography ==
- Ukrainians in Australia. Vol. 2: 1966-1995. Co-editor with Marko Pavlyshyn. (Melbourne: Australian Federation of Ukrainian Organizations, 1998)
- Stalin's Empire of Memory: Russian-Ukrainian Relations in the Soviet Historical Imagination (Toronto: University of Toronto Press, March 2004) ISBN 1-86064-504-6
- Ukraine: Birth of a Modern Nation (New York: Oxford University Press, 2007) ISBN 978-0-19-530546-3
- Europe’s Last Frontier? Belarus, Moldova, and Ukraine between Russia and the European Union. Co-editor with Oliver Schmidtke. (New York: Palgrave, 2008).
- Імперія пам'яті. Російсько-українські стосунки в радянській історичній уяві / Пер. з англійської Миколи Климчука і Христини Чушак. — К.: Критика, 2008. — 304 с. (ISBN 966-8978-08-0)
- The Conflict in Ukraine: What Everyone Needs to Know. Oxford: Oxford University Press, 2015 xix, 186 pp. Notes. Bibliography. Chronology. Index. Maps. (doi:10.1017/slr.2017.36)
  - Ukraine: What Everyone Needs to Know, 2nd ed. New York: Oxford University Press, 2020 xx, 209 pp. Notes. Bibliography. Chronology. Index. Maps. (ISBN 978-0-19-753210-2, 978-0-19-753211-9)
