= Dmytro Levytsky =

Ukrainian lawyer and political figure

- Дмитро Левицький
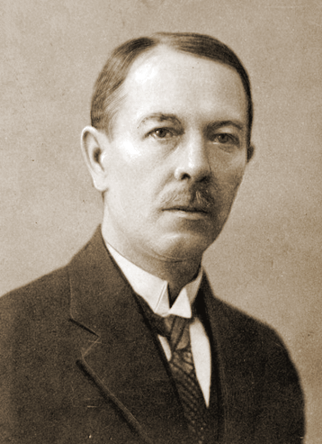
- Born: 1877; Lviv Region, Austria-Hungary
- Died: 1942 (aged 64–65); Bukhara
- Education: University of Vienna
- Occupations: Lawyer; political figure
- Known for: editor of Dilo newspaper, headed the Ukrainian National Democratic Alliance
- Notable work: chief of the Ukrainian delegation within the Polish parliament

Dmytro Pavlovych Levytsky (Ukrainian: Дмитро Павлович Левицький, Polish: Dymitr Lewicki; 1877–1942) was a lawyer and major political figure in western Ukraine between the two world wars. Between 1925 and 1935 he headed the Ukrainian National Democratic Alliance, the largest Ukrainian political party in western Ukraine, and served as the chief of the Ukrainian delegation within the Polish parliament.

== Biography ==
Dmytro Levytsky was born in the Lviv region, then part of Austria-Hungary, in 1877. He completed law school at the University of Vienna and during World War I served as an officer in the army of Austria-Hungary. Captured by the Russians in 1915, he spent the remainder of the war in Tashkent. Returning to Ukraine as the Russian Empire fell apart, Levytsky helped to organize the unification of the West Ukrainian National Republic with the Ukrainian National Republic. After western Ukraine was conquered by Poland in 1919, Levytsky was involved in organizing Ukrainians in Vienna. In 1923, he became editor of western Ukrainians' largest newspaper, Dilo, and two years later he became head of the newly formed Ukrainian National Democratic Alliance, the largest political party representing Ukrainians within the Polish state. Between 1928 and 1935 he was a member of the Polish parliament and was head of the Ukrainian delegation. He resigned his leadership of the party when it chose to work together with the Polish government. When western Ukraine was annexed by the Soviets, Levytsky was arrested, deported to Moscow and never heard from again.

He died in exile in Bukhara (1942).
