= Vasyl Mudry =

Ukrainian politician (1893–1966)

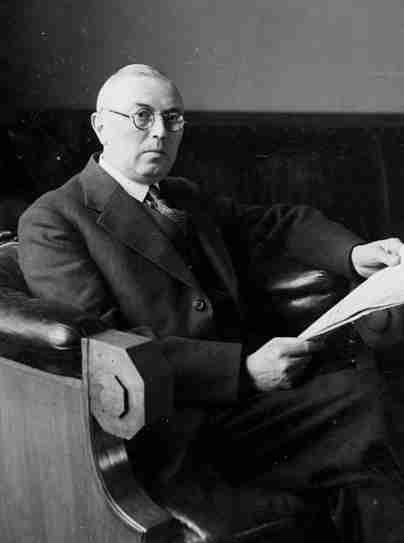
- Mudry in 1935
- Born: Wasyl Mudry; 19 March 1893; Okno, Austria-Hungary
- Died: 19 March 1966 (aged 73); Yonkers, New York, United States
- Occupations: Journalist and politician

Vasyl Mudry (Polish: Wasyl Mudry, Ukrainian: Василь Мудрий; 19 March 1893 – 19 March 1966) was a Polish-Ukrainian journalist and politician. He led the Ukrainian National Democratic Alliance, the largest Ukrainian political party in interwar Poland, and also served as speaker of the Polish parliament.

== Biography ==
Mudry was born on 19 March 1893 in the village of Okno in Skalat District, Kingdom of Galicia and Lodomeria, Austria-Hungary (today Vikno in Chortkiv Raion, Ukraine). From 1921 to 1933 he was part of the head committee of the Prosvita, an organization dedicated to preserving Ukrainian culture and spreading Ukrainian literacy. From 1927 until 1935 he was chief editor of Dilo, the largest Ukrainian newspaper in interwar Poland. Mudry was a member of the Ukrainian National Democratic Alliance (UNDO), the largest Ukrainian political party in interwar Poland. In 1935 UNDO experienced an internal conflict due to its policy of cooperation with the Polish government. UNDO's leader, Dmytro Levytsky, resigned his position in protest against such cooperation. Mudry then became UNDO's new leader and as part of a compromise between UNDO and the Polish government he became vice speaker of the Polish parliament.

Despite UNDO's cooperation with the Polish government, key demands such as Ukrainian autonomy or the establishment of a Ukrainian-language university for Poland's 4.4 million Ukrainians were not met. In 1938, Mudry declared that attempts at compromising with Poland failed. After German-controlled Czechoslovakia granted autonomy to Carpatho-Ukraine and articles in the German press began supporting the idea of a Ukrainian state including Polish territories, Mudry met with the German ambassador in Warsaw, stated that there was no hope for Polish-Ukrainian cooperation, and expressed hope for German support. This pro-German approach ended when Germany's ally Hungary conquered Carpatho-Ukraine and the Polish government renewed its stated commitment to Ukrainian autonomy. When Germany invaded Poland in 1939, UNDO under Mudry declared its loyalty to the Polish state.

Fleeing the Soviets who annexed Eastern Poland and who arrested most of the Ukrainian political figures who had not escaped (including Mudry's predecessor Dmytro Levytsky), Vasyl Mudry settled in Kraków where he became secretary of the Ukrainian National Committee. After the war, Mudry immigrated to America where from 1957 until his death in 1966 he was a member of the directorship of the Ukrainian Congress Committee of America. He died on 19 March 1966 in Yonkers, New York.

== Sources ==
- (in Polish) Ryszard Torzecki, Polacy i Ukraińcy. Sprawa ukraińska w czasie II wojny światowej na terenie II Rzeczypospolitej, Warszawa 1993, Wyd. PWN, ISBN 83-01-11126-7
- (in Polish) Kto był kim w drugiej Rzeczypospolitej, Warszawa 1994, Oficyna Wydawnicza BGW, ISBN 83-7066-569-1
- (in Polish) Ryszard Tomczyk, Ukraińskie Zjednoczenie Narodowo-Demokratyczne 1925–1939, Książnica Pomorska, Szczecin 2006,ISBN 83-87879-60-6
