= Legacy of Taras Shevchenko =

Impact of Ukrainian poet and writer

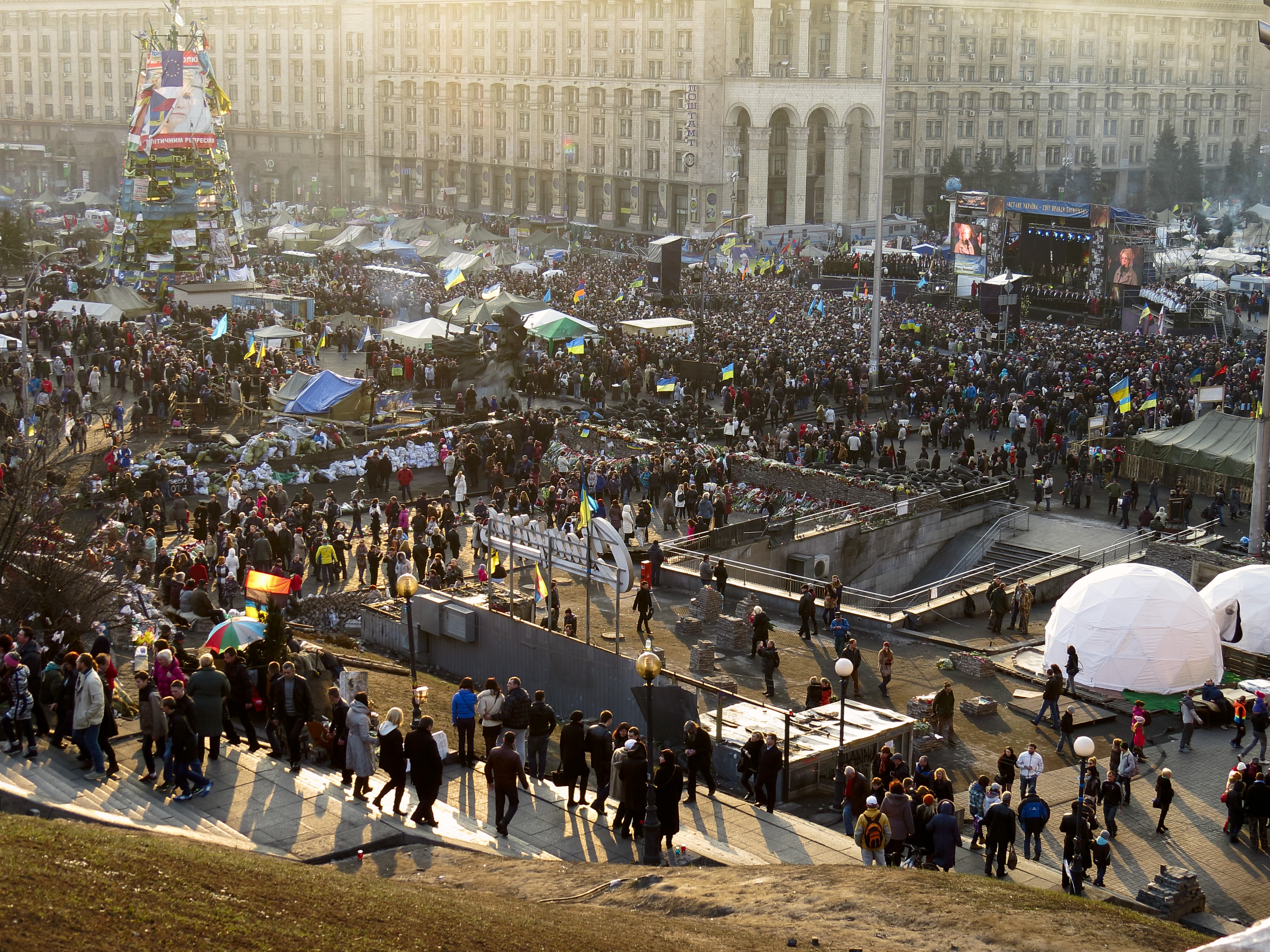
Celebrations for the 200th anniversary of the birth of Taras Shevchenko in 2014. Euromaidan.

Taras Hryhorovych Shevchenko (March 9 [O.S. February 25] 1814 – March 10 [O.S. February 26] 1861) was a Ukrainian poet, writer, artist, public and political figure, as well as folklorist and ethnographer. His literary heritage is regarded to be the foundation of modern Ukrainian literature and, to a large extent, the modern Ukrainian language. Shevchenko is also known for many masterpieces as a painter and an illustrator.

== Political and cultural legacy ==
Shevchenko's political ideas and his fight against injustice and violations of human rights led him to be perceived as an advocate of the Ukrainian nation, and his word became an inspiration for millions of people. George Grabowicz called Shevchenko a prophet and a spiritual father of the Ukrainian nation's revival. His humanist ideas contributed to the integration of Ukrainian literature into the world mainstream and led the nation out of obscurity. The potency of Shevchenko's personality is demonstrated by the fact, that not only Ukrainians, but even people who denied the very fact of the Ukrainian nation's existence used his popular image in their concepts.

=== Russian Empire ===
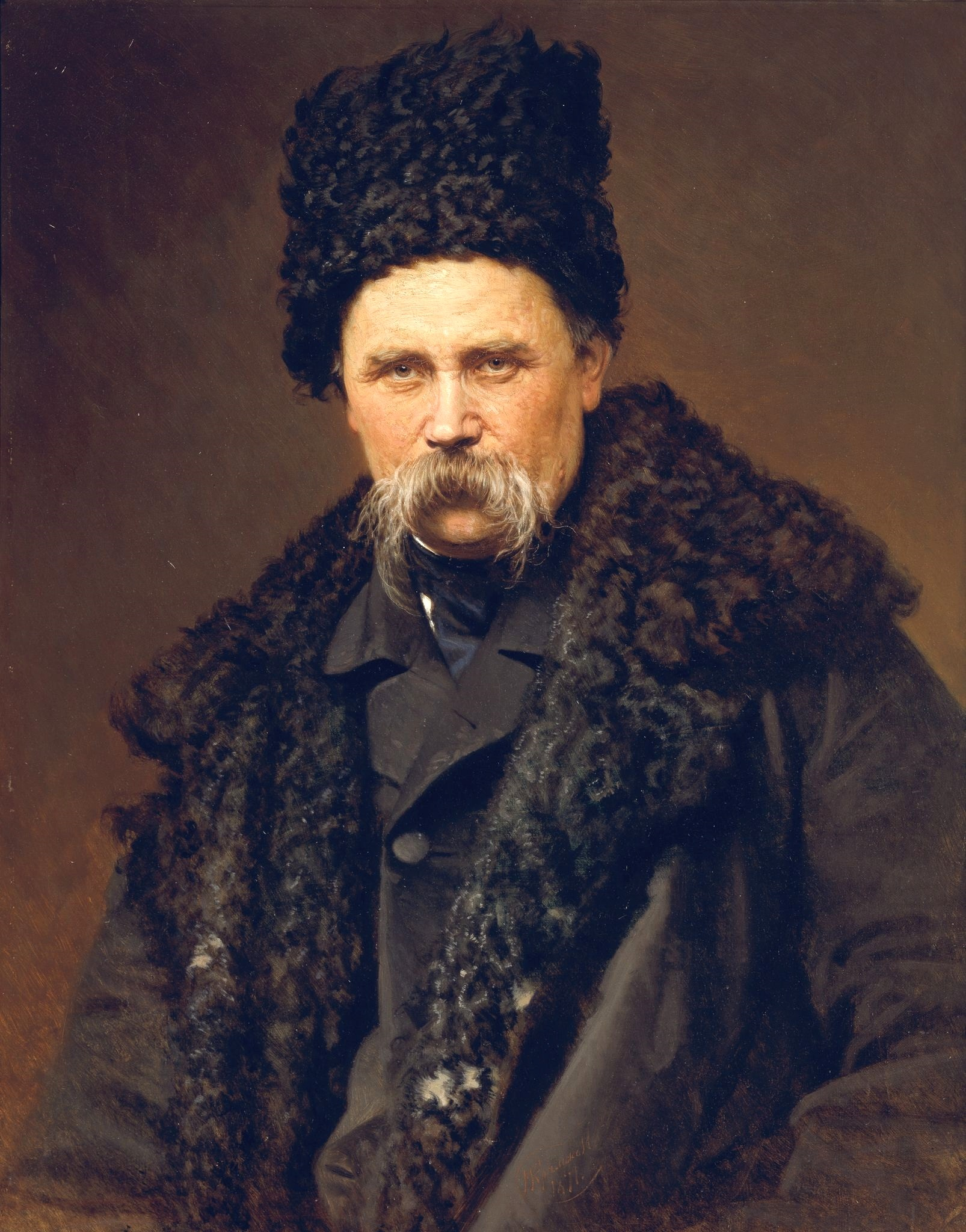
A posthumous portrait of Taras Shevchenko by Ivan Kramskoi, 1871

Recognized as a "people's poet" and a national symbol of Ukraine, soon after his death Shevchenko became a popular figure among Ukrainians of various political orientations. In the Russian Empire his works were censored by the government, which attempted to suppress his anti-Russian, anti-Church and anti-monarchist works. At the same time, the tsarist regime published some of Shevchenko's poems, which could be seen as directed against Poles and Jews, such as the Haidamaky. Shevchenko's works were illustrated by a number of prominent authors, including Opanas Slastion and Mikhail Mikeshin, and there were even attempts to include a depiction of the poet into the Millennium of Russia monument along with fellow Ukrainian Nikolai Gogol. Shevchenko's writings were also used in the propaganda of Black Hundreds, whose leaders Vladimir Purishkevich, Antony Khrapovitsky and Anatoly Savenko held the poet in high esteem.

Official attitude to Shevchenko's legacy in the Russian Empire was greatly influenced by the publication of the first uncensored Kobzar in 1907, which included many of his anti-tsarist and anti-Russian poems. As a result, in 1913-1914 Russian monarchists started a campaign against Shevchenko and his works, and the Orthodox Church accused him of blasphemy and intemperance. Despite this, Shevchenko remained popular among the wide circles of Ukrainian population, including the clergy. Many ethnic Ukrainian deputies in the State Duma opposed the government ban on public celebrations of Shevchenko's centenary, which was imposed in 1914, and numerous letters were addressed by readers to newspapers which were accused of presenting a negative image of the poet.

=== Habsburg Monarchy ===
By the time of Shevchenko's death, his works started attaining popularity among the Ruthenians of Galicia, who saw in them a more modern alternative to the predominantly parochial culture of the region dominated by the Greek Catholic Church. Already in 1848 Shevchenko's fame and poetic talent were noticed by Galician authors Ivan Vahylevych and Mykola Ustyyanovych. Mentions of Shevchenko as the "father of Ruthenia" and "martyr of Ukraine" are present in early works of Bukovinian poet Yuriy Fedkovych. Starting from 1862, copies of Kobzar, Haidamaky and other works by Shevchenko spread around Galicia, producing a furore among local readers. Shevchenko's popularity was so big, that even the popular anthem Shche Ne Vmerla Ukraina... would be mistakenly ascribed to him. In 1867 a full collection of the poet's verse was published in Lviv, and several months later a memorial evening in his honour of was organized under the direction of Oleksander Barvinsky.

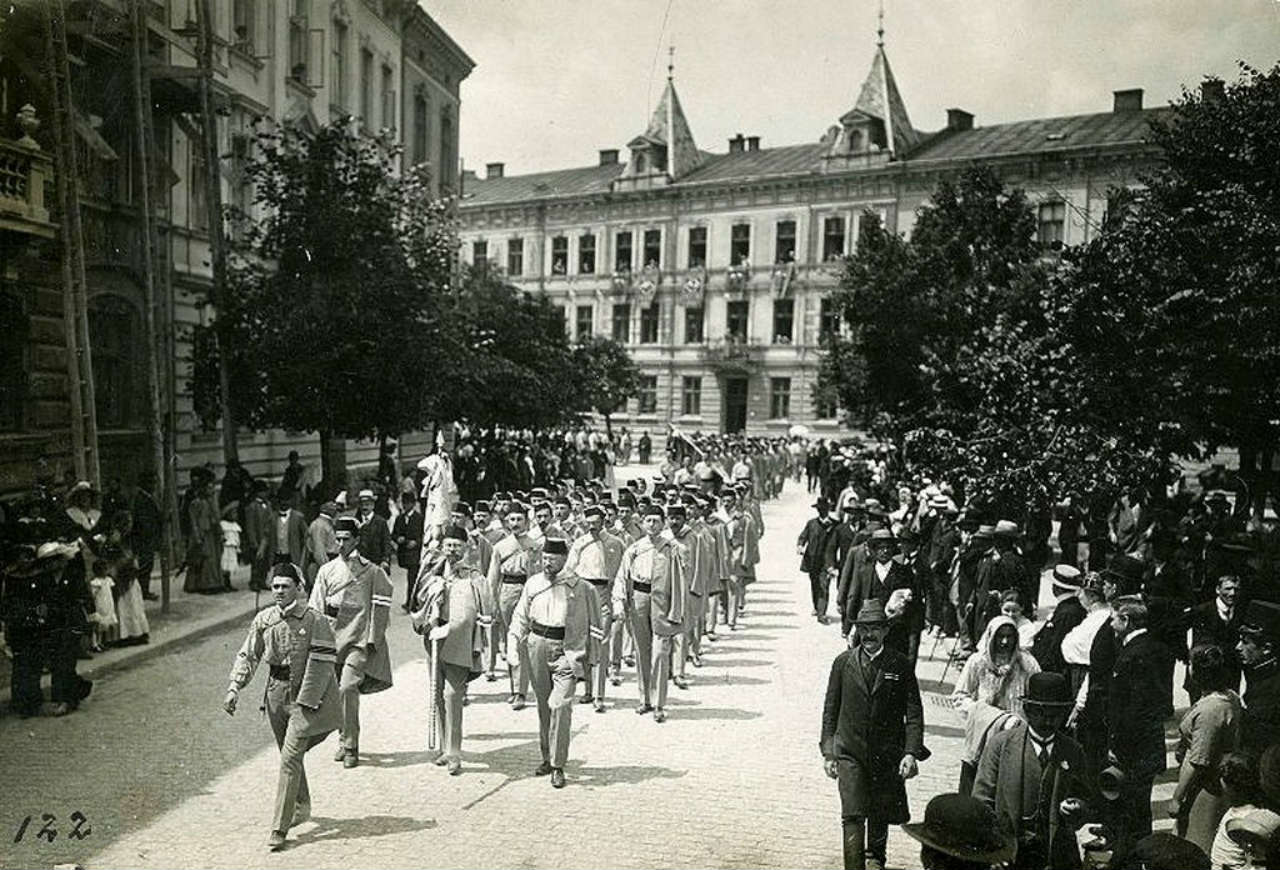
Celebration of Shevchenko's centenary in Lviv, 1914

Shevchenko's texts contributed to a change in fashion of the Galician youth, with Cossack clothes such as fur hats, sharovary, zhupan and belts becoming popular. Singing of folk songs and use of Cossack-inspired terms such as "osavul" and "hetman" in daily speech also became widespread, and the younger generation of gymnasium students started using a phonetic orthography, which would only be officially adopted in 1892. In Galicia during the latter half of the 19th century Shevchenko's cult existed not only among Ukrainophiles, but also among Moscophiles and Rusyns. Many local Poles also developed interest in his writings, with his biography being published in the Polish language. At the same time, the older generation of Galician clergy eventually adopted a hostile attitude to the poet, considering him a schismatic. In 1873 the Shevchenko Scientific Society was established with the support of Ukrainians living in the Russian Empire. This and other organizations such as Prosvita and Hromada supported Shevchenko's popularity by organizing numerous events dedicated to his person.

Shevchenko's emerging cult became an inspiration for the establishment of Narodovtsi movement, which promoted the national unity of Ukrainians in Galicia and Dnieper Ukraine. Prior to the First World War, numerous monuments to Shevchenko were erected by Ukrainian community around Galicia. The apogee of the poet's popularity was the celebration of his centenary in 1914, which included a parade organized in central Lviv with the participation of around 10,000 Ukrainian activists. In this way, Shevchenko's figure became essential in the emergence of the idea of modern Ukraine, uniting different parts of its ethnic territory inside of one cultural space.

=== Soviet Union ===
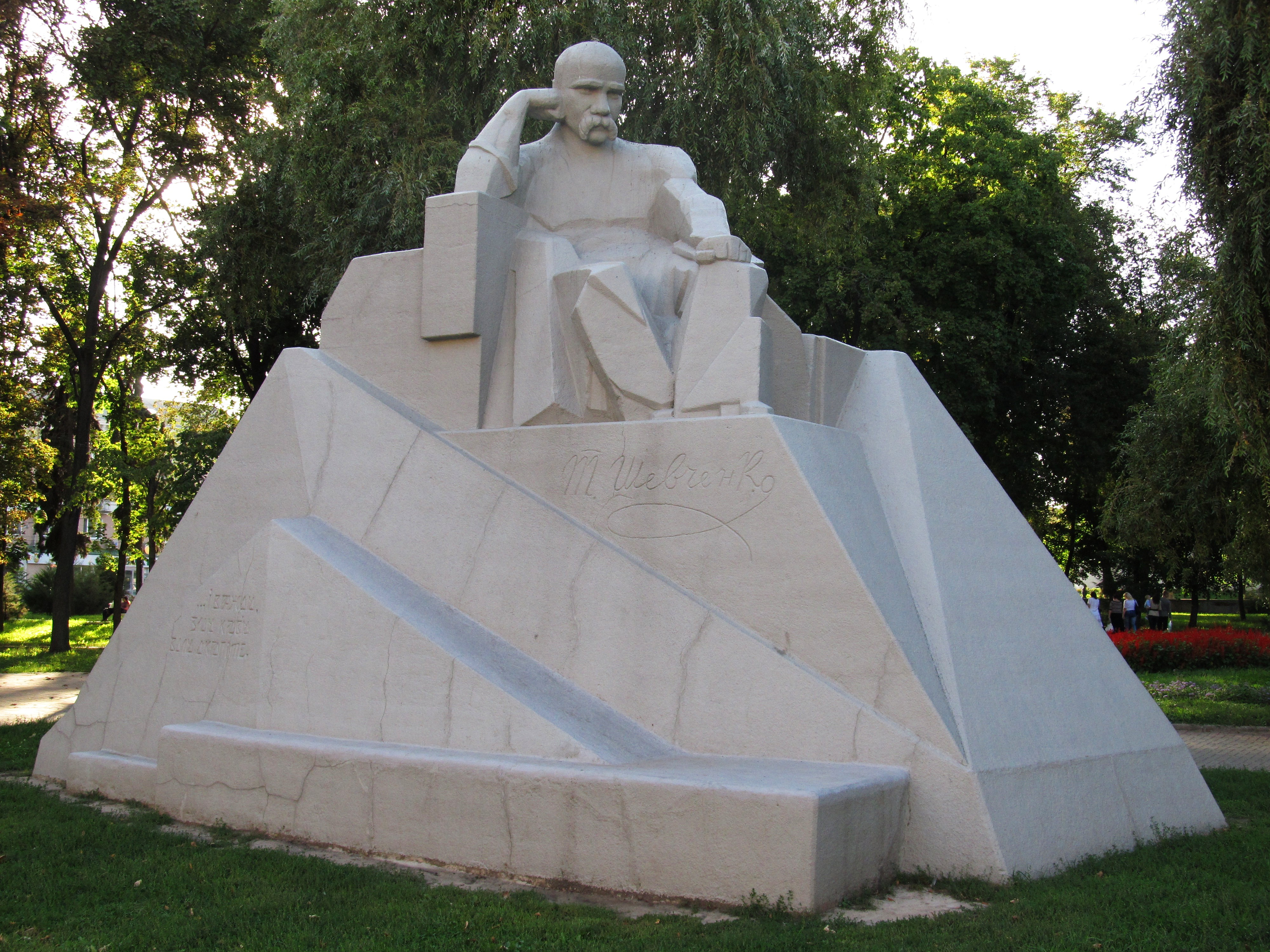
A modernist monument to Shevchenko in Poltava, created by Ivan Kavaleridze in 1926

Shevchenko's image as a "people's poet" and "revolutionary democrat", first established by Russian narodniks, was directly inherited by Soviet propaganda. In 1921 the All-Ukrainian Central Executive Committee declared the anniversary of the poet's death a national holiday and issued a decree, which, among others, ordered the installment of monuments to Shevchenko in all cities, towns and big villages. In 1934 the Communist Party issued a collection of theses dedicated to the 120th anniversary of Shevchenko's birth, which had a mostly declarative character. In scientific literature he was declared to be a companion of Chernyshevsky, Dobrolyubov and other figures of the Russian progressive movement. Large-scale celebrations dedicated to Shevchenko took place in 1939 and included the unveiling of a monument to the poet in Kyiv, presided by Nikita Khrushchev. In honour of the centenary of Shevchenko's death, Soviet-dominated World Peace Council declared 1961 to be the International Year of Shevchenko. During that year mass celebrations took place on Taras Shevchenko's grave in Kaniv, and the Shevchenko Republican Prize was instituted by the government of Soviet Ukraine.

=== Independent Ukraine ===
In modern days Taras Shevchenko remains a central figure of Ukrainian culture. His legacy is analyzed and reinterpreted depending on one's views in respect to the Ukrainian people, religion, culture and other topics. Despite all discussions, Shevchenko is respected by Ukrainians from various regions and of different political orientations, and his image as a national poet, prophet, revolutionary and cultural genius lives on in popular consciousness.

== Places and objects commemorating Shevchenko ==
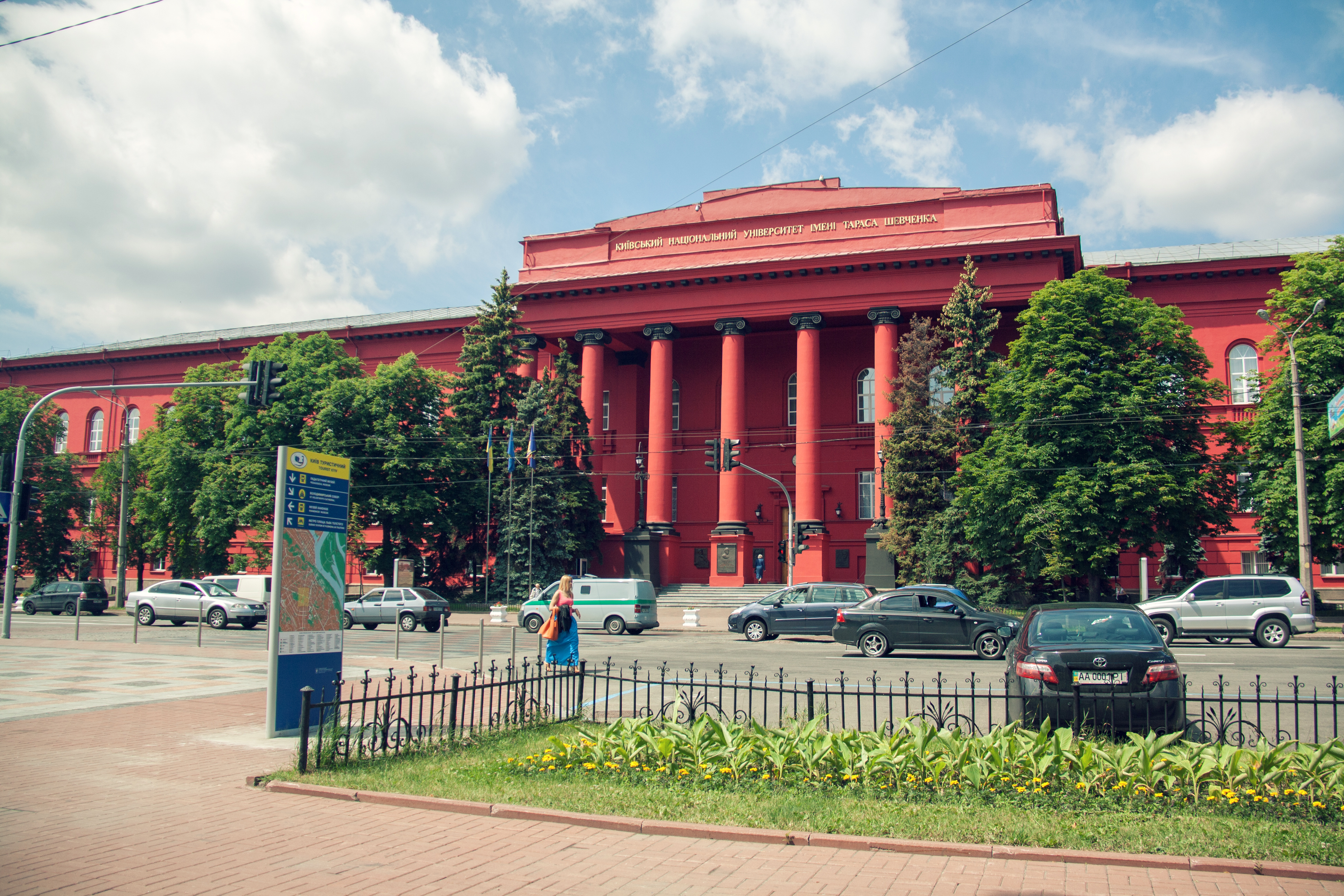
Taras Shevchenko University's original building, the "Red Building", today.

In March 2014, an interactive map of sites dedicated to Shevchenko was launched to commemorate the 200th anniversary of his birth. "The World of Shevchenko" was created by the Inter TV channel and information portal Podrobnosti; it maps 1060 monuments of Shevchenko, alongside, towns, villages, museums, schools and theaters named in his honor, located in 32 countries on different continents.

Among the most notable objects commemorating Shevchenko are the symbolic kobza sculpture in Canberra, Australia's capital, graffiti of the poet's portrait in Kharkiv and a memorial in Washington, D.C.. The most distant objects dedicated to the poet are a monument in Beijing (6456 km from Kyiv), Shevchenko Street in Khabarovsk (6900 km), and memorials in Washington (7847 km), Buenos Aires (12 826 km) and Canberra (14 913 km).

From 1966 to 1968, Hanna Veres made a series of ornamental textiles dedicated to the poet. The 1971 edition of Shevchenko's Kobzar is illustrated with reproductions of the textiles, co-produced with Hanna Vasylashchuk.

== Geographic places ==
Shevchenko has been commemorated by the naming of geographic places, including:

- Aktau, Mangystau Region, Kazakhstan, formerly known as Shevchenko.
- Fort-Shevchenko, Mangystau Region, Kazakhstan, The military fort city in the same region where the poet served his exile.
- Korsun-Shevchenkivskyi, a city in central Ukraine
- Shevchenko Raion, a district in Kyiv
- Taras Shevchenko Place, a street in New York City
- Taras Shevchenko Street, a street in Tashkent, Uzbekistan (41.2981348°N 69.2785351°E). This street also hosts Taras Shevchenko monument
- Shevchenko Boulevard, a street in LaSalle, Quebec
- Station Tarasa Shevchenka, a station on the Kyiv Metro
- Taras Shevchenko railway station, a railway station in Smila, Ukraine
- Shevchenko, Donetsk Oblast

== Educational institutions ==
- Taras Shevchenko National University of Kyiv, third oldest university in Ukraine
- School 110, Tashkent, Uzbekistan is named after Taras Shevchenko
- Shevchenko Transnistria State University in Tiraspol, the capital of Transnistria, the region's main university.
- National Museum Taras Shevchenko, museum in Kyiv
- Taras Shevchenko Museum, Kazakhstan, Mangystau Region, City of Fort-Shevchenko.

== Other ==
- Aleksandra (1991), formerly Taras Shevchenko, T. G. Shevchenko, Soviet/Ukrainian/Kazakh/Russian river cruise ship
- Shevchenko National Prize, Ukrainian State Prize for works of culture and arts
- 2427 Kobzar, an asteroid
- Interbrigade company Taras Shevchenko, Ukrainian volunteer formation in the Spanish Civil War.
- Ukrainian composer Tamara Maliukova Sidorenko (1919-2005) set several of Shevchenko’s poems to music.
- Taras Shevchenko AI chatbot, the digital reincarnation of Taras Shevchenko implemented by means of artificial intelligence.
- Official Taras Shevchenko Instagram page, managed by experts from the National Museum Taras Shevchenko in collaboration with the RAVATAR technological company.

== Memorials ==
=== Ukraine (birthplace) ===
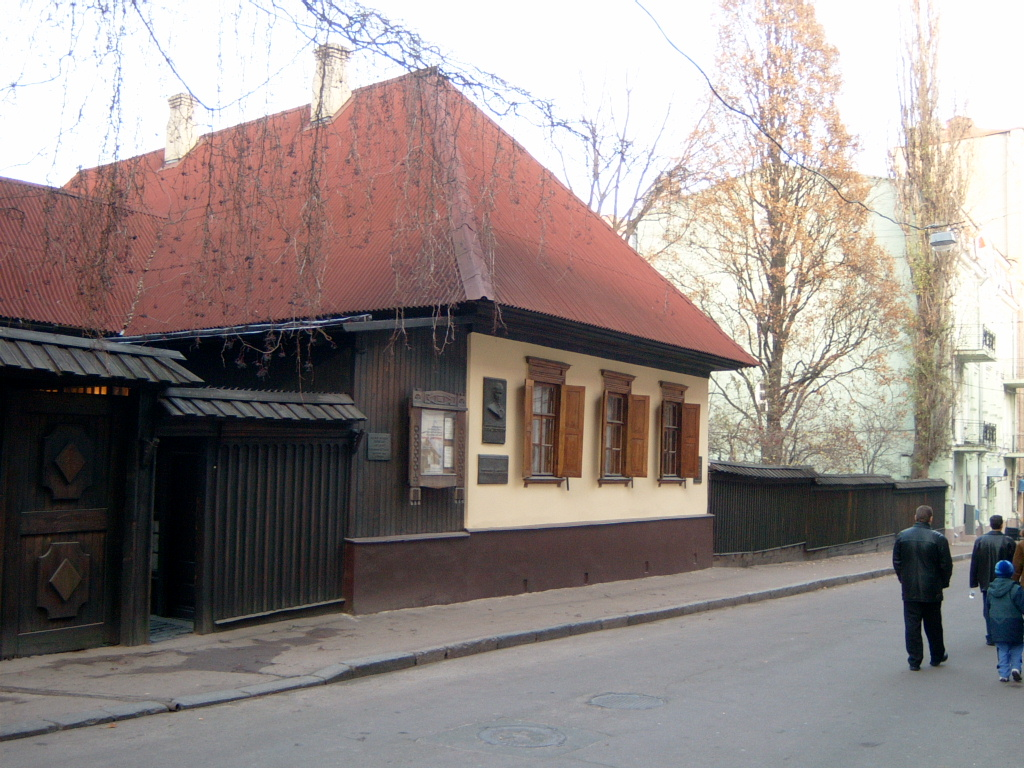
A house in which Shevchenko stayed in Kyiv, now a memorial museum

There are many monuments to Shevchenko throughout Ukraine, most notably at his memorial in Kaniv and in the center of Kyiv, just across from the Kyiv University that bears his name. The Kyiv Metro station, Tarasa Shevchenka, is also dedicated to Shevchenko. Other notable monuments to the poet located throughout Ukraine are in Kharkiv (in front of Shevchenko Park), Lviv, Luhansk, and other localities. After Ukraine gained its independence in the wake of the 1991 Soviet collapse, some Ukrainian cities replaced their statues of Lenin with statues of Shevchenko. In some locations that lacked streets named after him, local authorities renamed the streets or squares to Shevchenko.

In 2001, the Ukrainian cultural organisation Prosvita raised the initiative of building a church near the Chernecha Mount in Kaniv, where Taras Shevchenko is buried. The initiative got a rather supportive response in the society. Since then many charity events have been held all over the country to gather donations for the above purpose.

A marathon under the slogan "Let's Build a Church for the Kobzar" by the First National Radio Channel of Ukraine collected ₴39,000 (about US$7,500) in October 2003.

=== Elsewhere in Europe ===
==== Greece ====
There are three busts in Greece: a) in the yard of the Ukrainian embassy in Filothei, Athens, b) in the Goudi Park in Zografou, Athens, and c) in the Taras Hryhorovych Shevchenko Square in Mandra, a small city 26 km west of Athens.

==== Lithuania ====
There is a street named after Shevchenko in Vilnius where Shevchenko lived, as well as a monument.

==== Romania ====
There is a bilingual Taras Shevchenko high school in Sighetu Marmatiei, Romania.

=== Nations formerly in the USSR ===
==== Belarus ====
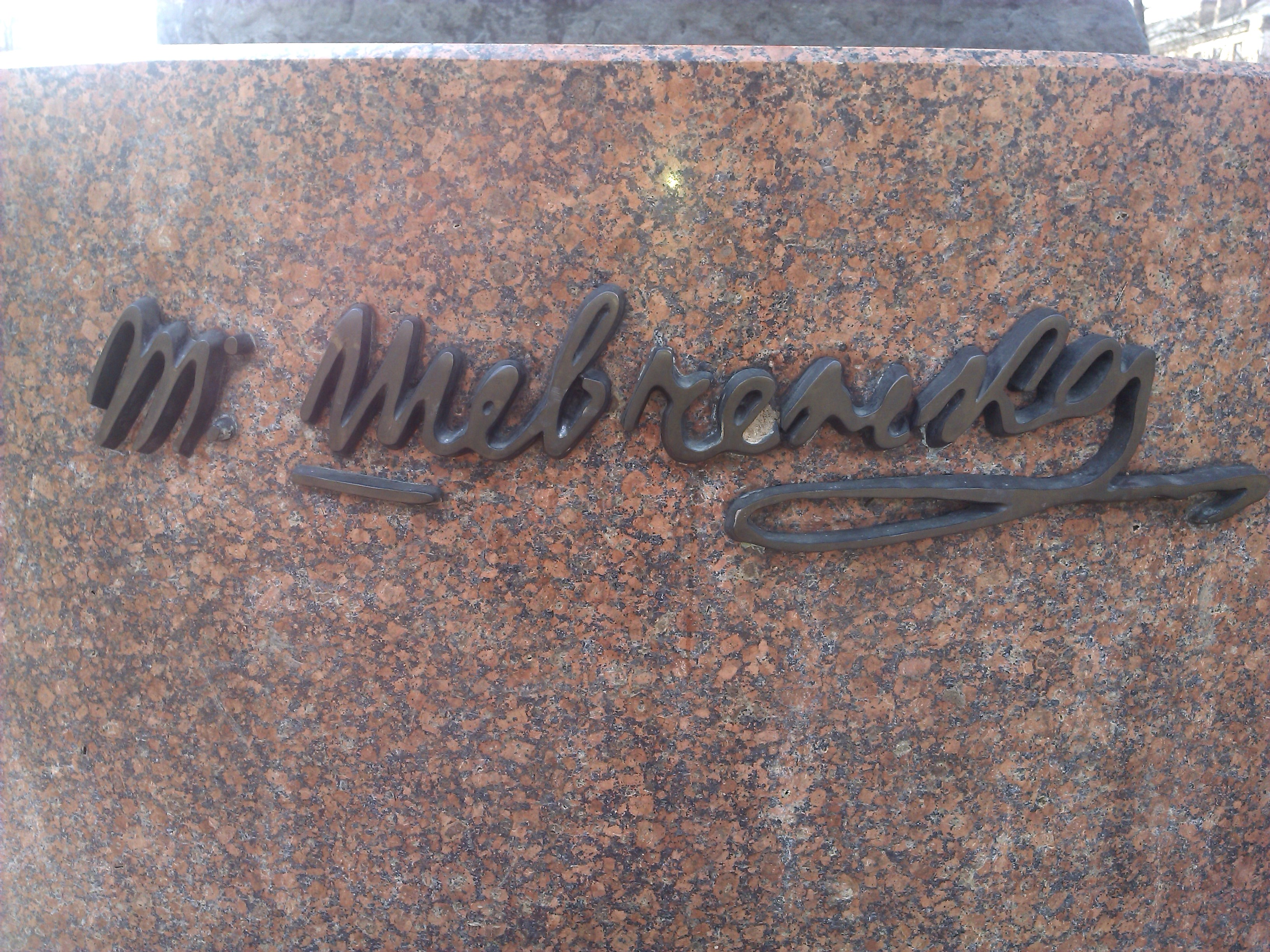
Signature on Monument of Taras Shevchenko in Minsk

A boulevard named after Shevchenko appeared in Minsk, Belarus, in 1964, and a small monument to Shevchenko at the beginning of the boulevard in 1978. In 2002 another monument to Taras Shevchenko was inaugurated in Minsk (at the Stepanovski garden).

==== Kazakhstan ====
There are Shevchenko monuments and museums in the cities of Kazakhstan where he was later transferred by the military: Aqtau (the city was named Shevchenko between 1964 and 1992) and nearby Fort Shevchenko (renamed from Fort Alexandrovsky in 1939).

==== Moldova ====
Taras Shevchenko Transnistria State University in Tiraspol, the capital of Transnistria, is the main university of that region.

==== Russian Federation ====
Outside of Ukraine, monuments to Shevchenko have been put up in several locations of the former USSR associated with his legacy, both in the Soviet and the post-Soviet times. The modern monument in Saint Petersburg was erected on 22 December 2000, but the first monument (pictured) was built in the city in 1918 on the order of Lenin shortly after the October Revolution.

There is a monument located next to the Shevchenko museum at the square that bears the poet's name in Orsk, Russia (the location of the military garrison where the poet served), where there are also a street, a library, and a Pedagogical Institute named for the poet.

==== Uzbekistan ====
A monument to Shevchenko on a street that bears his name can also be found in the city centre of Tashkent, Uzbekistan.

=== North America ===
Outside of Ukraine and the former USSR, monuments to Shevchenko have been put up in many countries, usually under the initiative of local Ukrainian diasporas. There are several memorial societies and monuments to him throughout Canada and the United States.

==== Canada ====
The most notable Canadian monument is the bronze and granite statue of Taras Shevchenko in Ottawa, created by Leo Mol, and unveiled on June 26, 2011. (see Taras Shevchenko Monument Ottawa). The Leo Mol sculpture garden in Winnipeg, Manitoba, Canada, contains many images of Taras Shevchenko.

A two-tonne bronze statue of Shevchenko, located in a memorial park outside of Oakville, Ontario, was discovered stolen in December 2006. It was taken for scrap metal; the head was recovered in a damaged state, but the statue was not repairable. The head is on exhibit at the Taras Shevchenko Museum & Memorial Park Foundation in Toronto.

A Taras Shevchenko Museum & Memorial Park Foundation is located in Toronto, Ontario, Canada. A video tour of the museum was created in March 2010. Among other exhibits, the video tour includes footage of Shevchenko's death mask.

There is a Shevchenko Boulevard in the Lasalle borough of Montreal, Quebec. The town of Vita in Manitoba, Canada, was originally named Shevchenko in his honor.

==== United States ====
The most notable American monument is the large bronze and granite monument in Washington, D.C., near Dupont Circle designed by artist Leo Mol. The carving of the granite stonework was by Vincent Illuzzi of Barre, Vermont. There is also a monument in Soyuzivka in New York State, Tipperary Hill in Syracuse, New York.

A park in Elmira Heights, New York, has a memorial to Shevchenko and to the Ukrainian diaspora. A street is named after Shevchenko in New York City's East Village. A section of Connecticut Route 9 that goes through New Britain is also named after Shevchenko.

=== South America ===
There is a statue and monument in Palermo Park in Buenos Aires, Argentina.

There is a statue of Taras Shevchenko at Ukraine Square in Curitiba, Brazil.

There is a Shevchenko Square in Paris located in the heart of the central Saint-Germain-des-Prés district.

== Other legacies ==
=== Media references ===
The British band New Order released a live video on Factory Records titled Taras Shevchenko, recorded in 1981 at the Ukrainian National Home in the East Village of New York City; the initial scenes feature a digitised version of the Shevchenko self-portrait. The video artwork was done by graphic designer Peter Saville. This was later included on their video New Order 3 16.

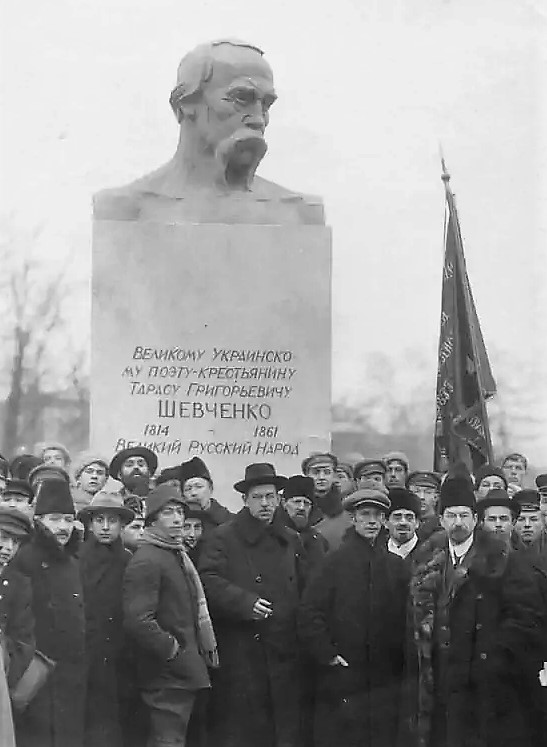
Unveiling of the Shevchenko monument by Janis Tilbergs, in Petrograd, Russia, 1918

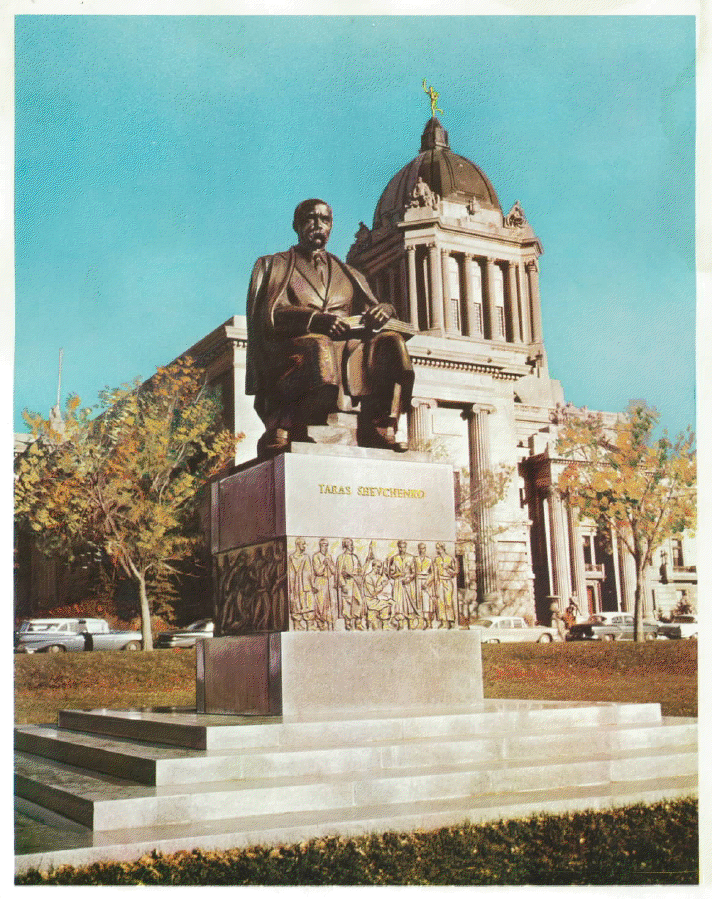
Taras Shevchenko Monument, Manitoba Legislative Grounds, Winnipeg, Manitoba, Canada

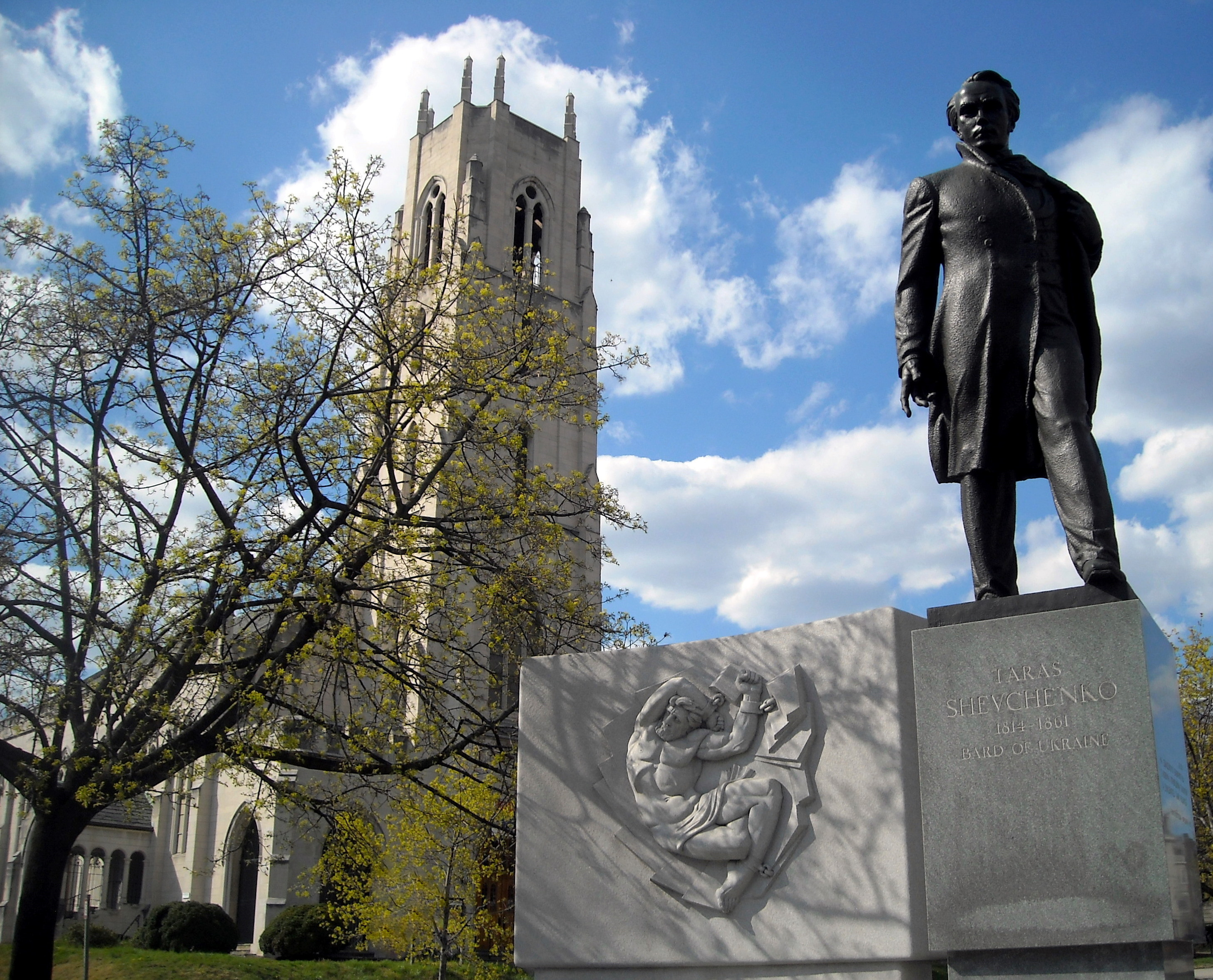
Taras Shevchenko Memorial in Washington, D.C.

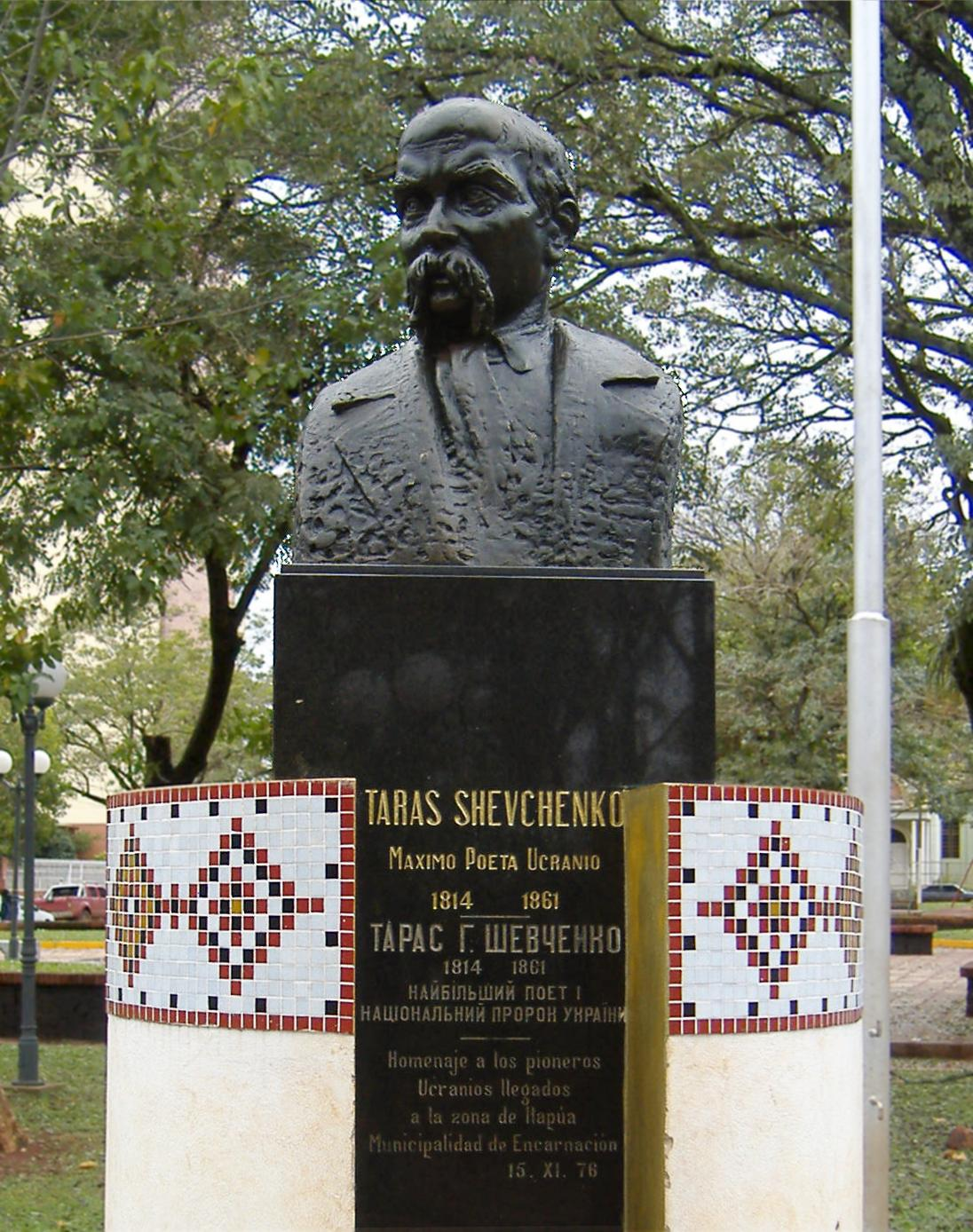
Shevchenko bust dedicated to Ukrainian immigrants in Encarnación, Paraguay

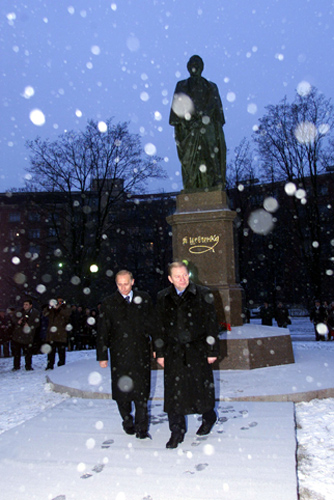
Vladimir Putin and Leonid Kuchma open Taras Shevchenko Monument in St. Petersburg, 2000

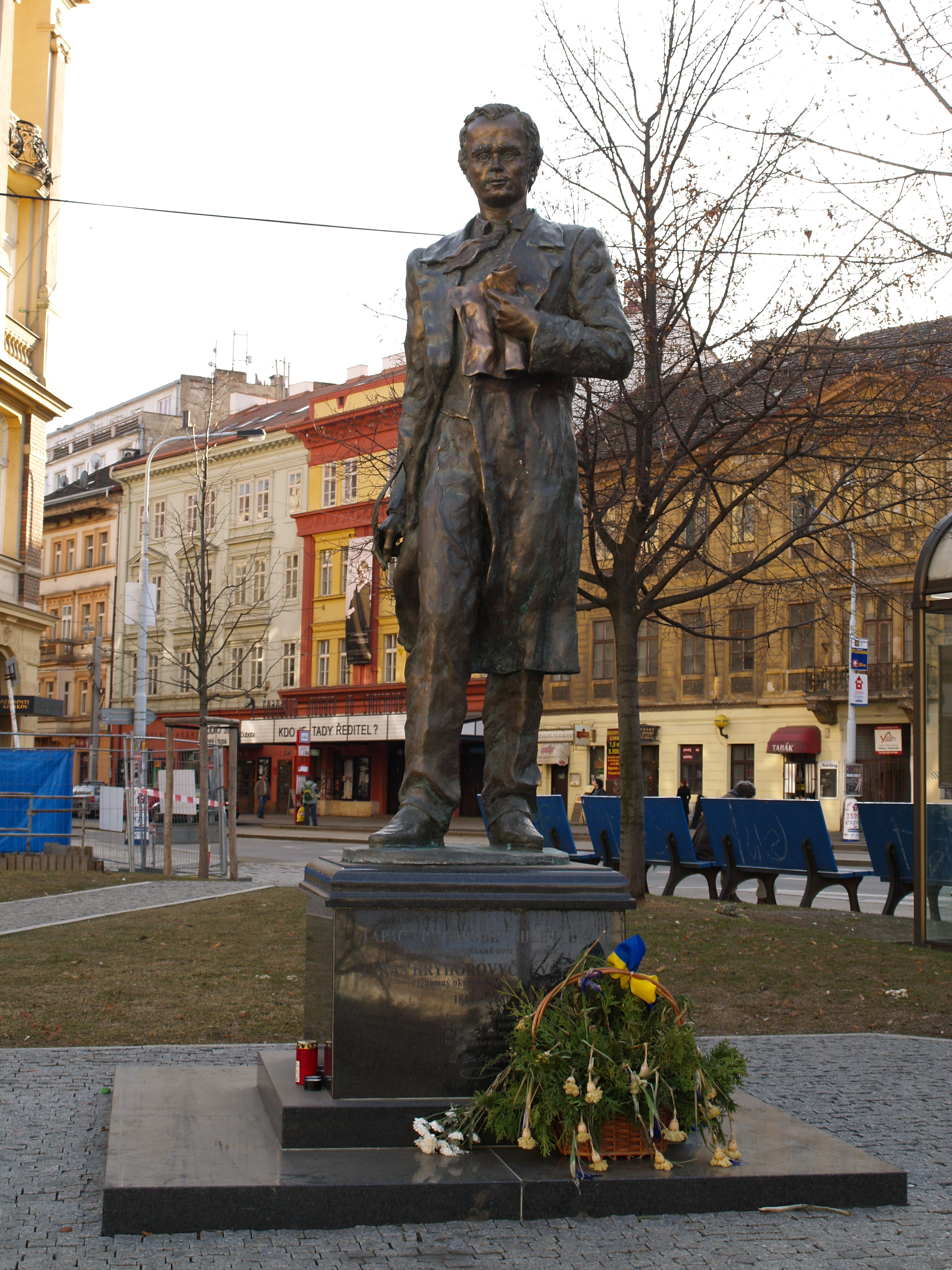
Taras Shevchenko Monument in Prague, Czech Republic

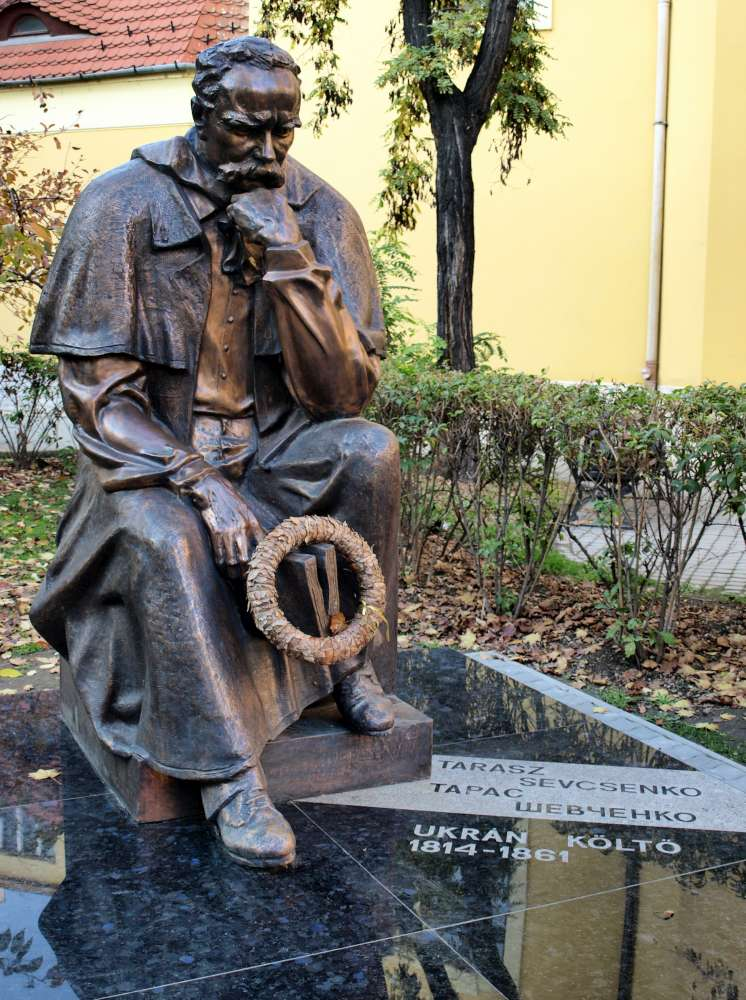
Taras Shevchenko statue in Budapest, Hungary

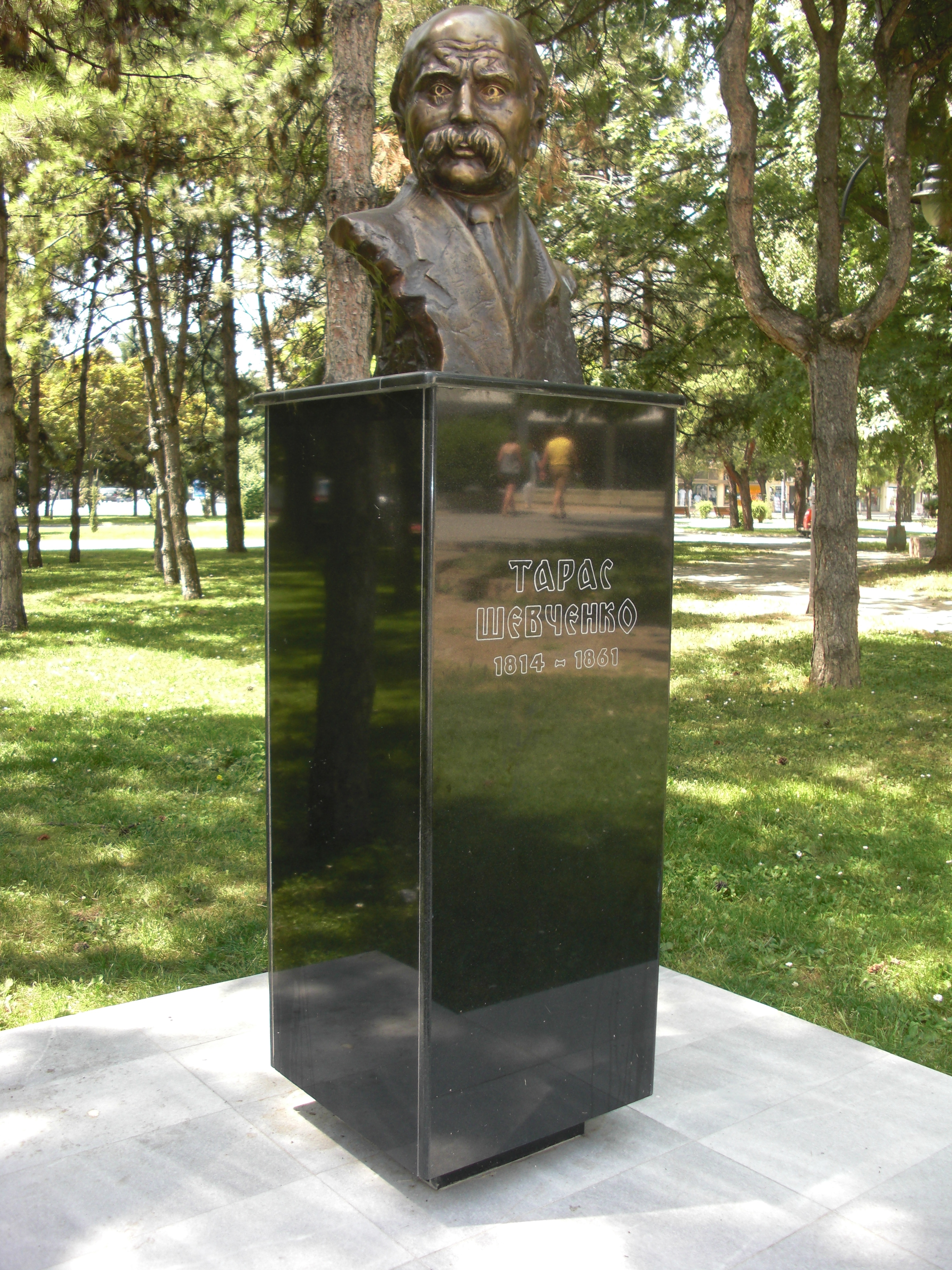
Bust of Taras Shevchenko in Skopje, North Macedonia

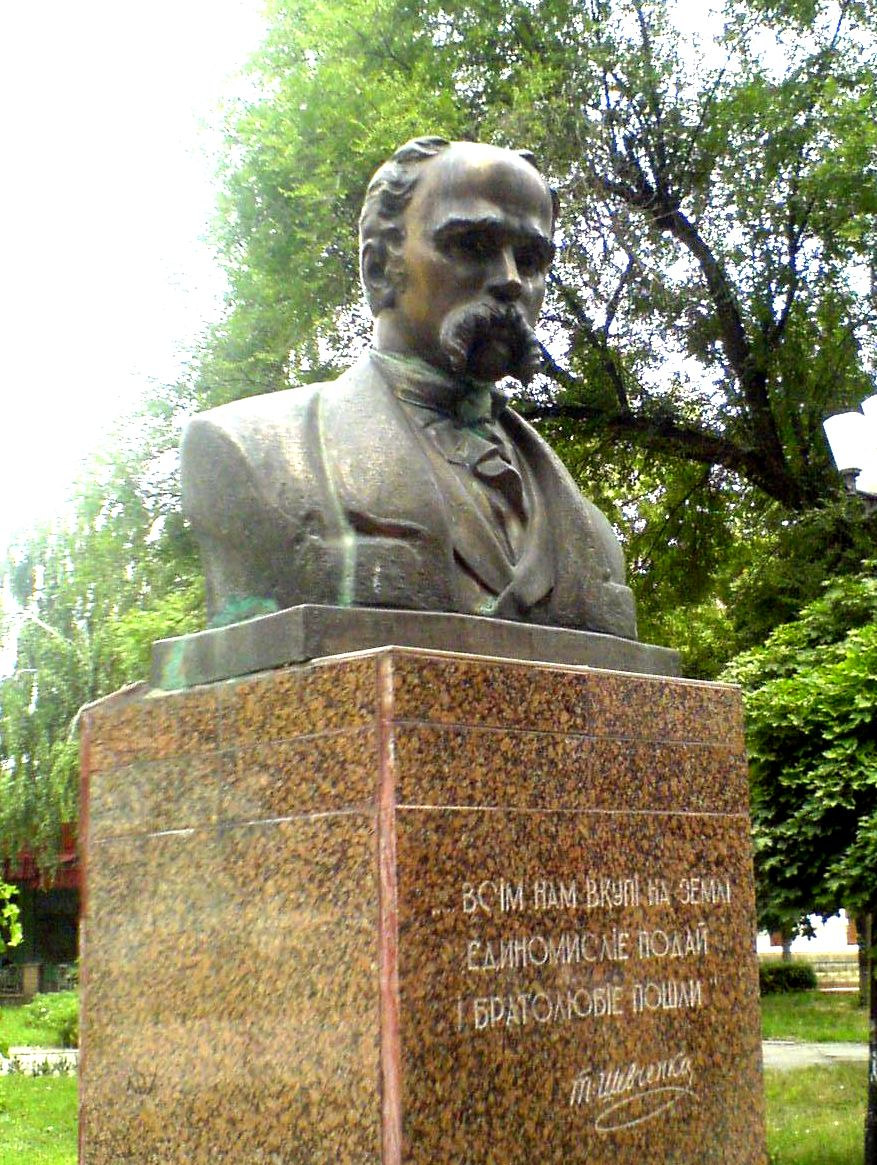
Monument to Taras Shevchenko in Beltsy. Moldova

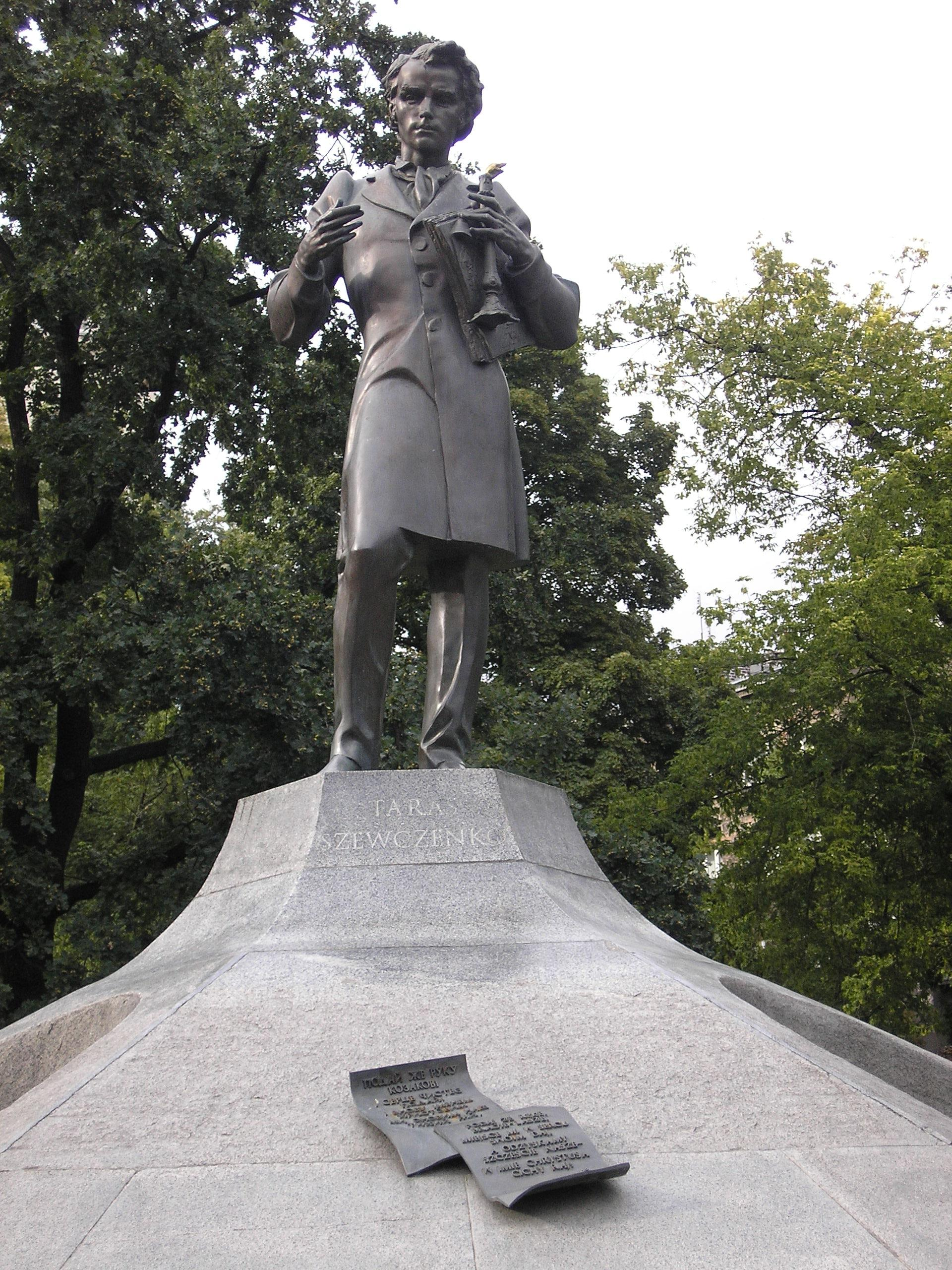
Taras Shevchenko Monument in Warsaw, Poland

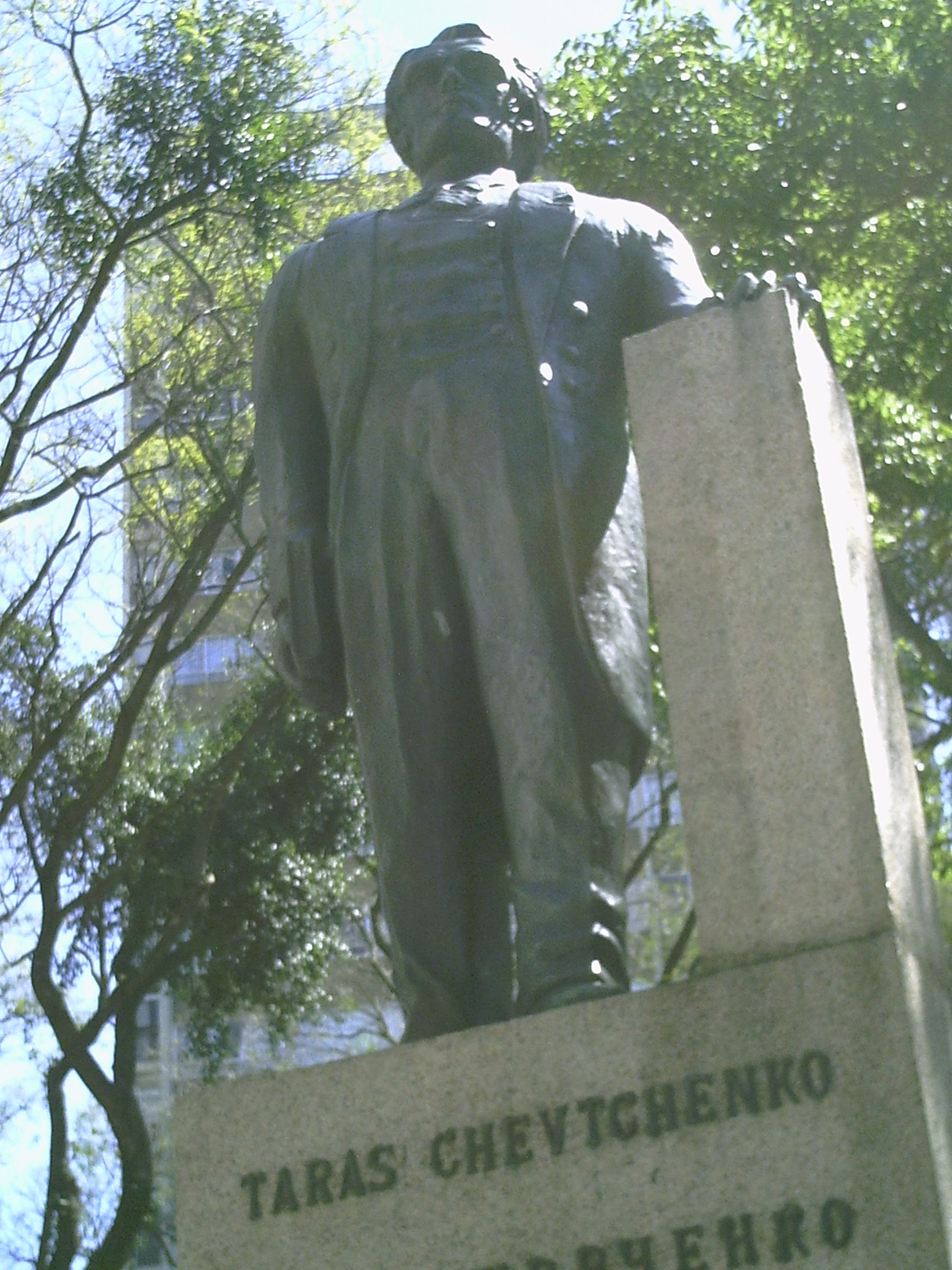
Taras Shevchenko Monument in Curitiba, Brazil

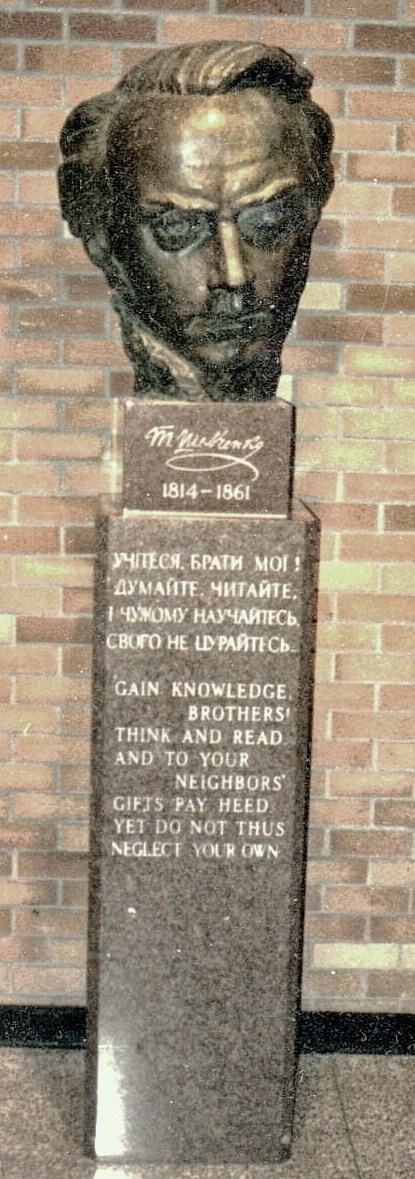
Bust of Shevchenko foyer of "Shevchenko School" Vita, Manitoba, Canada

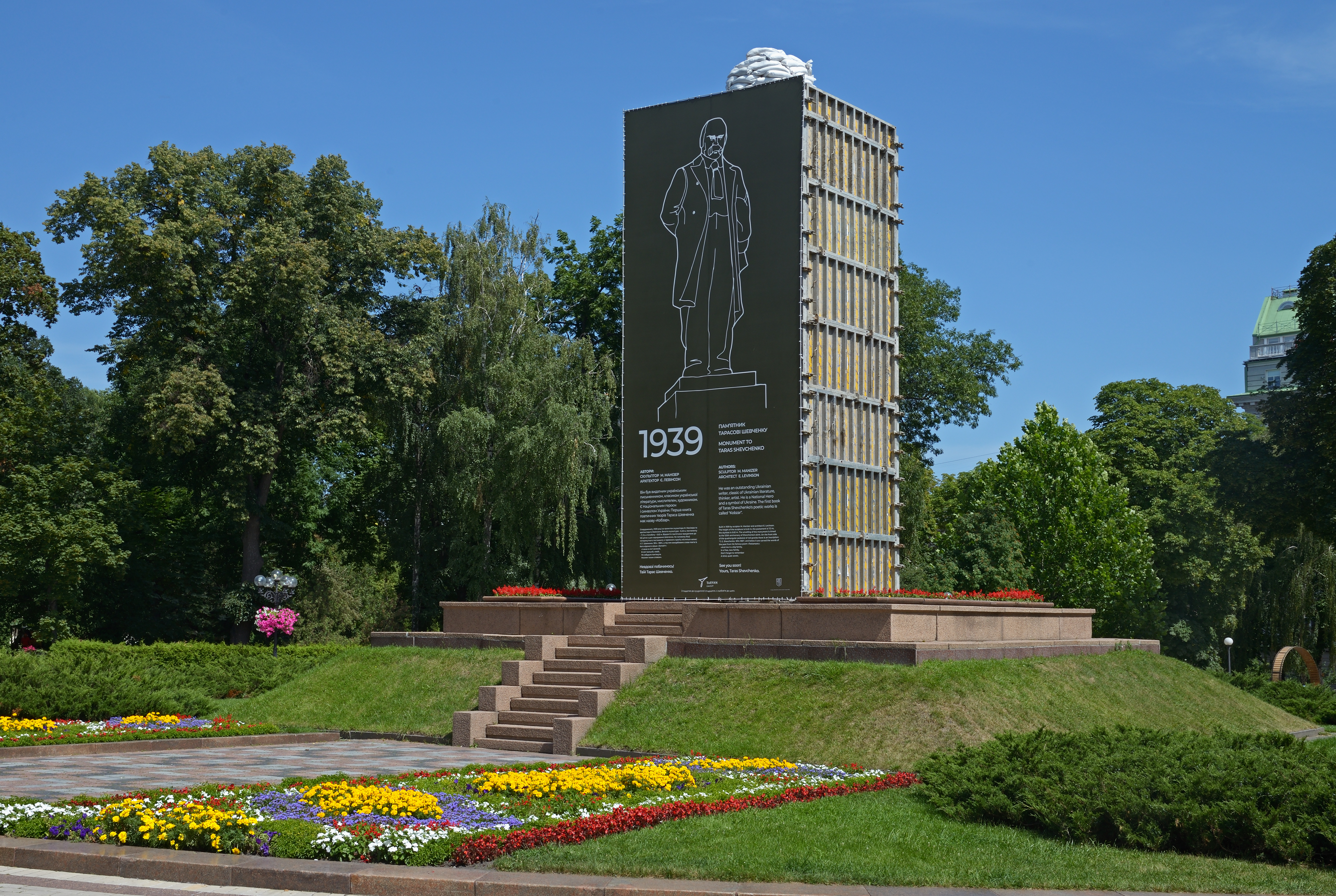
Monument to Taras Shevchenko, sheltered from Russian shelling. Kyiv, Ukraine, July 2022

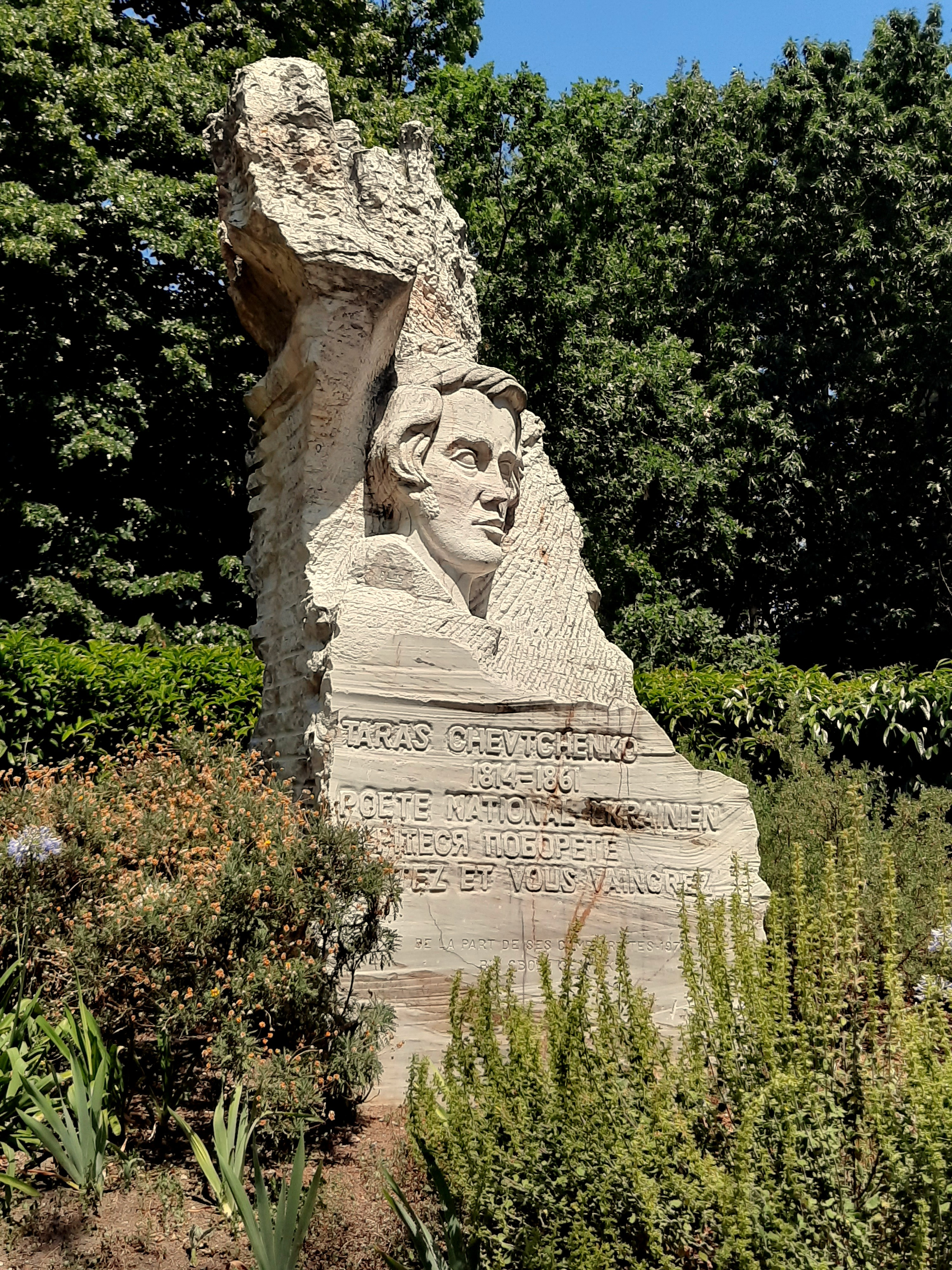
Taras Shevchenko Monument in Toulouse, France

== Currency ==
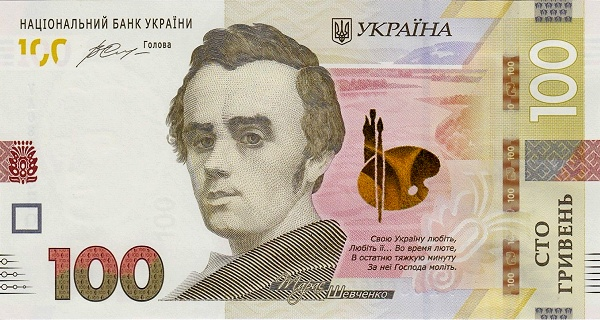
Taras Shevchenko on the current ₴100 banknote

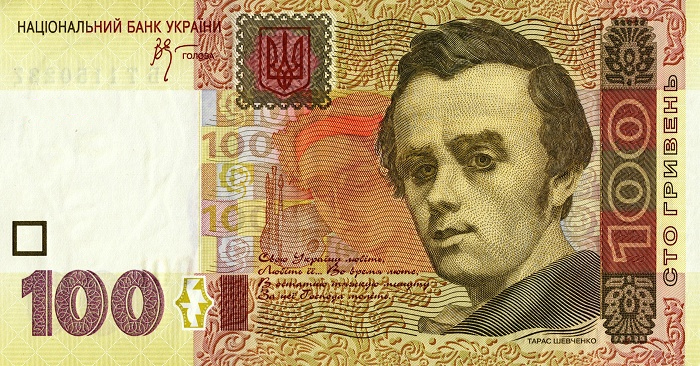
Previous ₴100 banknote

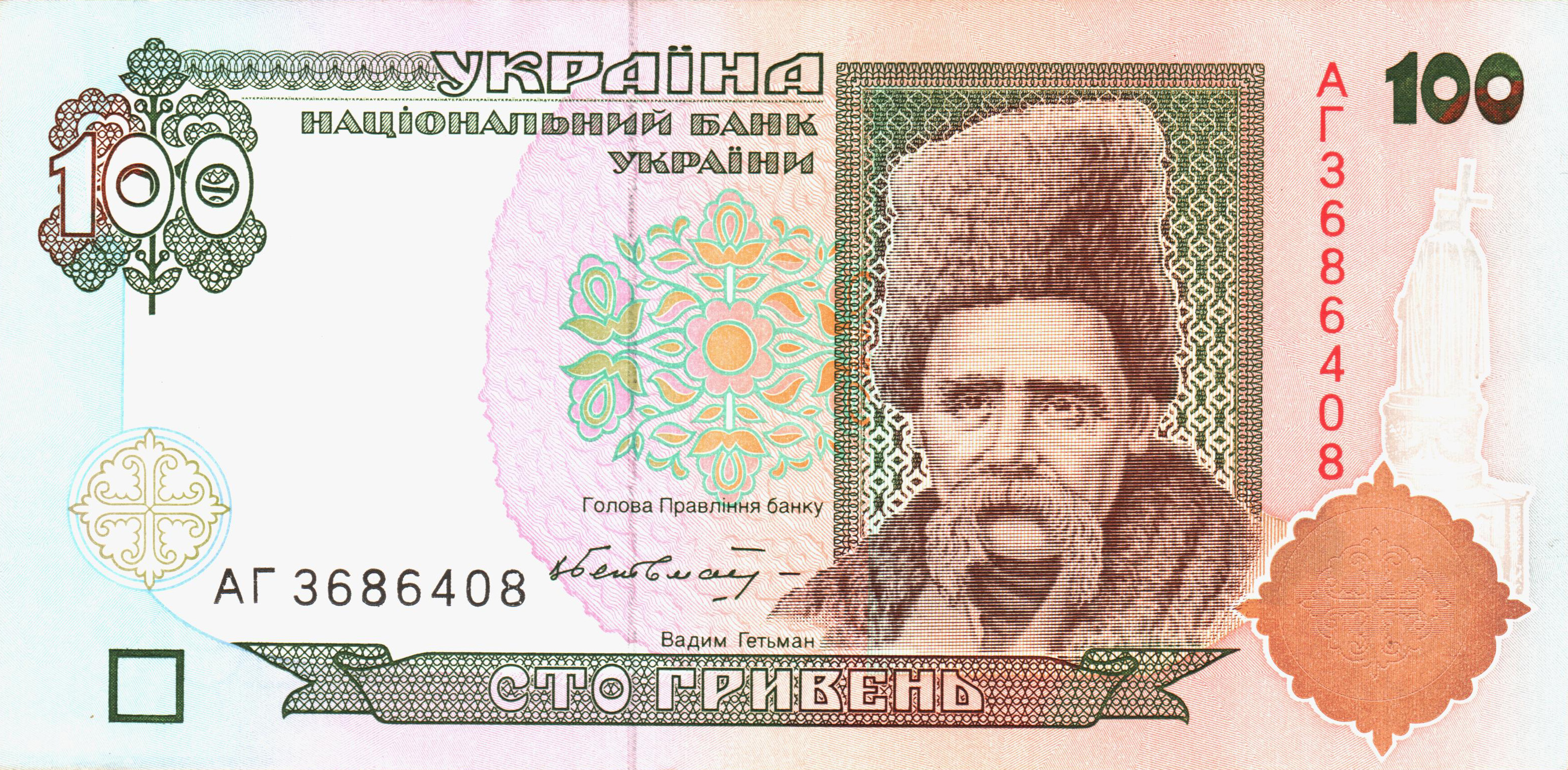
Previous ₴100 banknote

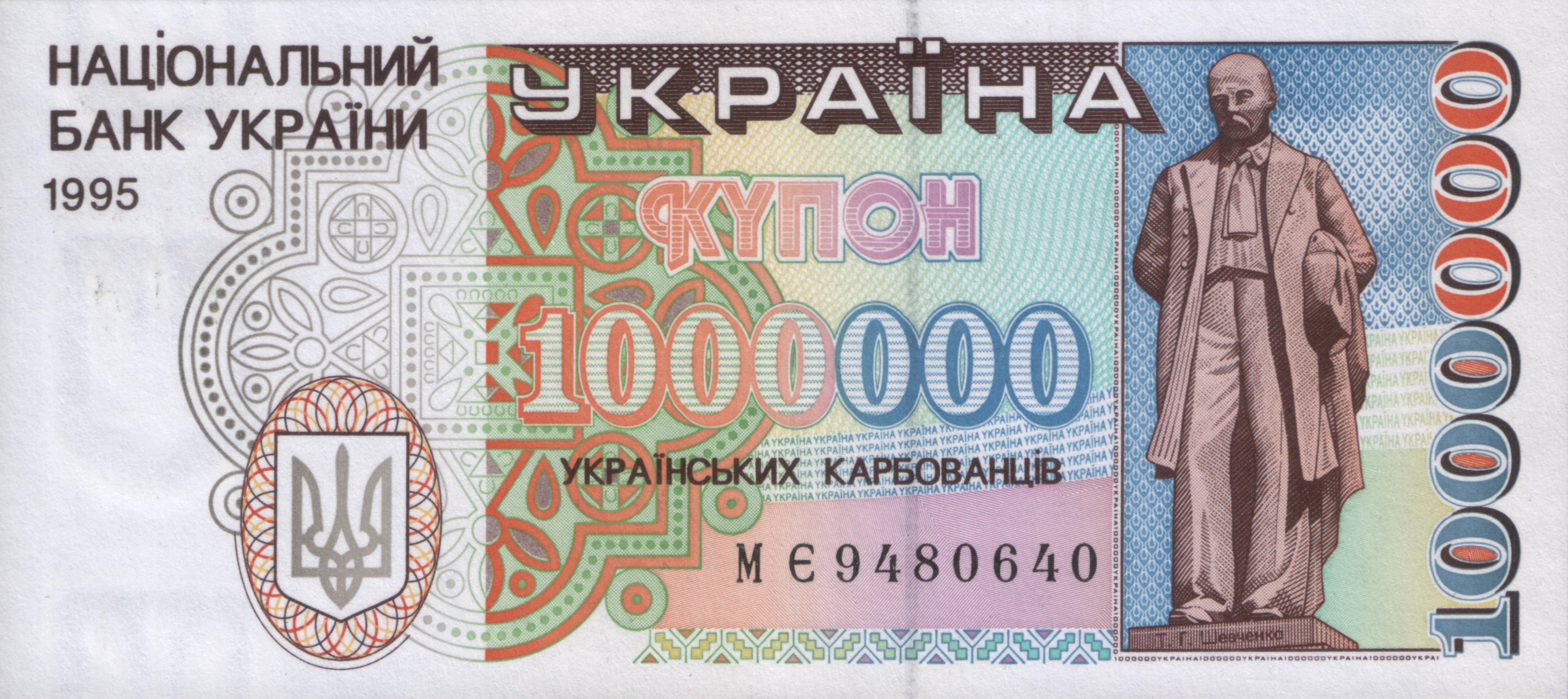
Taras Shevchenko on the obsoleted 1,000,000 karbovanets banknote

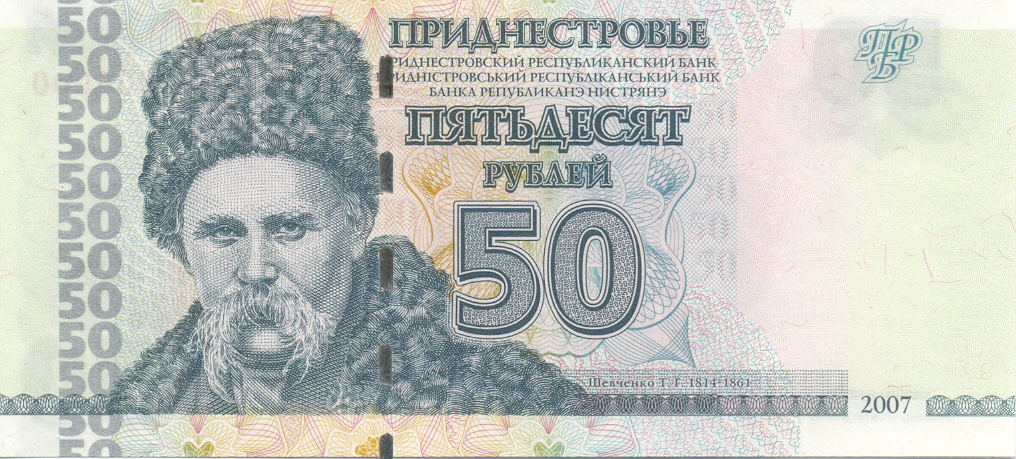
Taras Shevchenko on the current banknote of 50 ruble (currency of Transnistria, an unrecognized state on Moldovan territory)

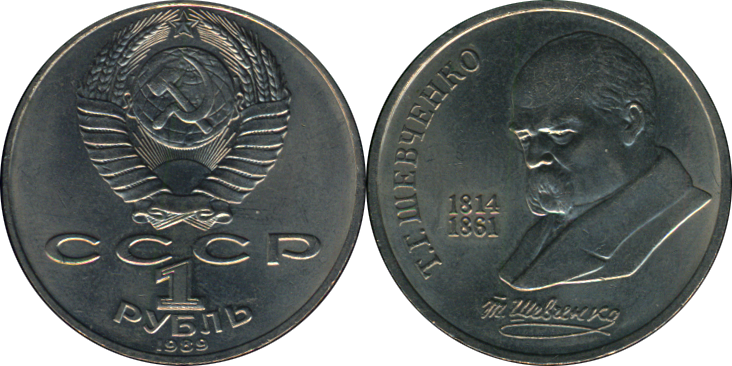
175th anniv. of Taras Shevchenko's birth (1 Soviet rouble)

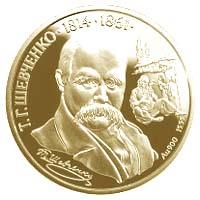
200th anniv. of Taras Shevchenko's birth (200 Hryven, gold)

== Postage ==
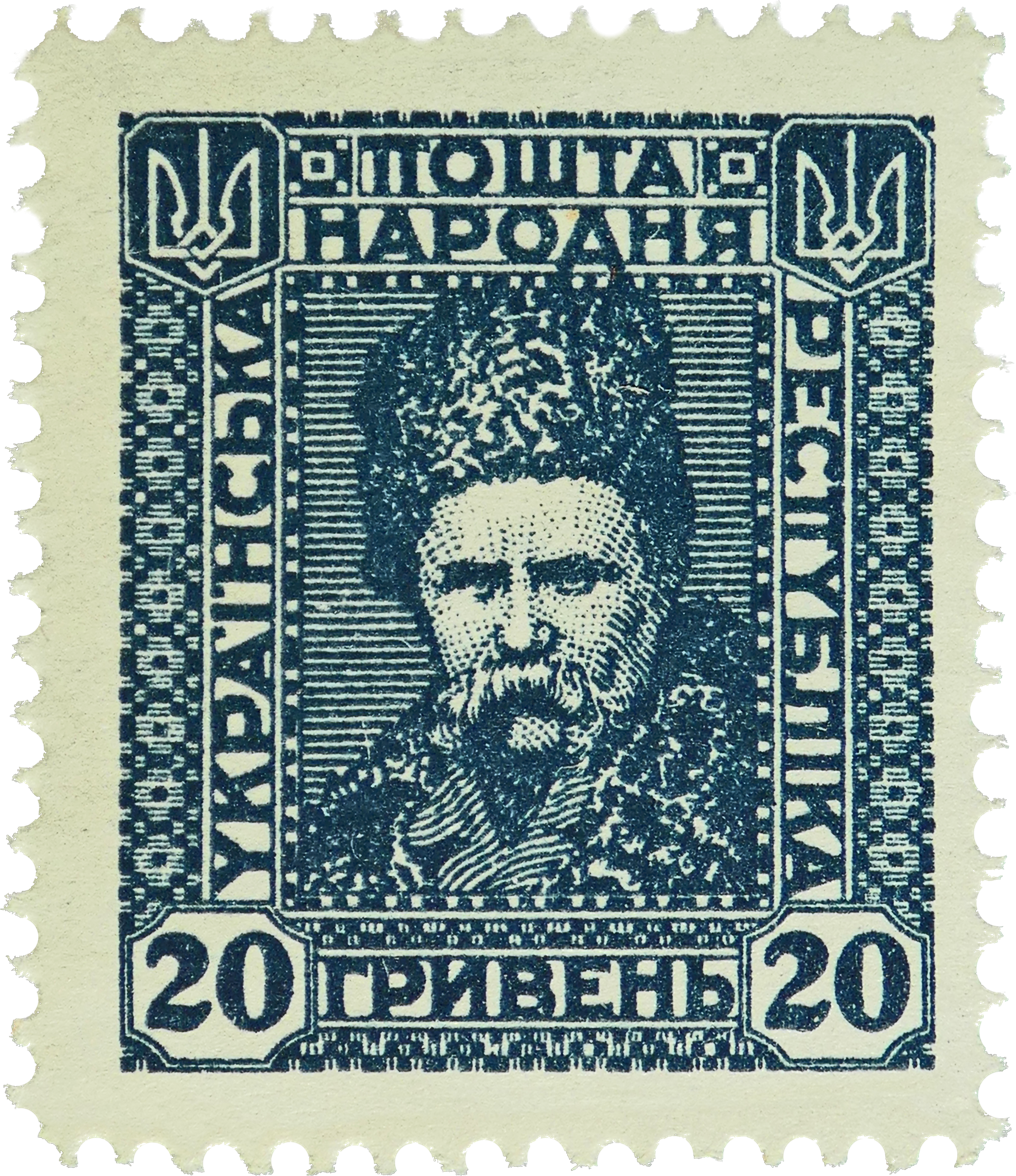
UPR issue, 1920

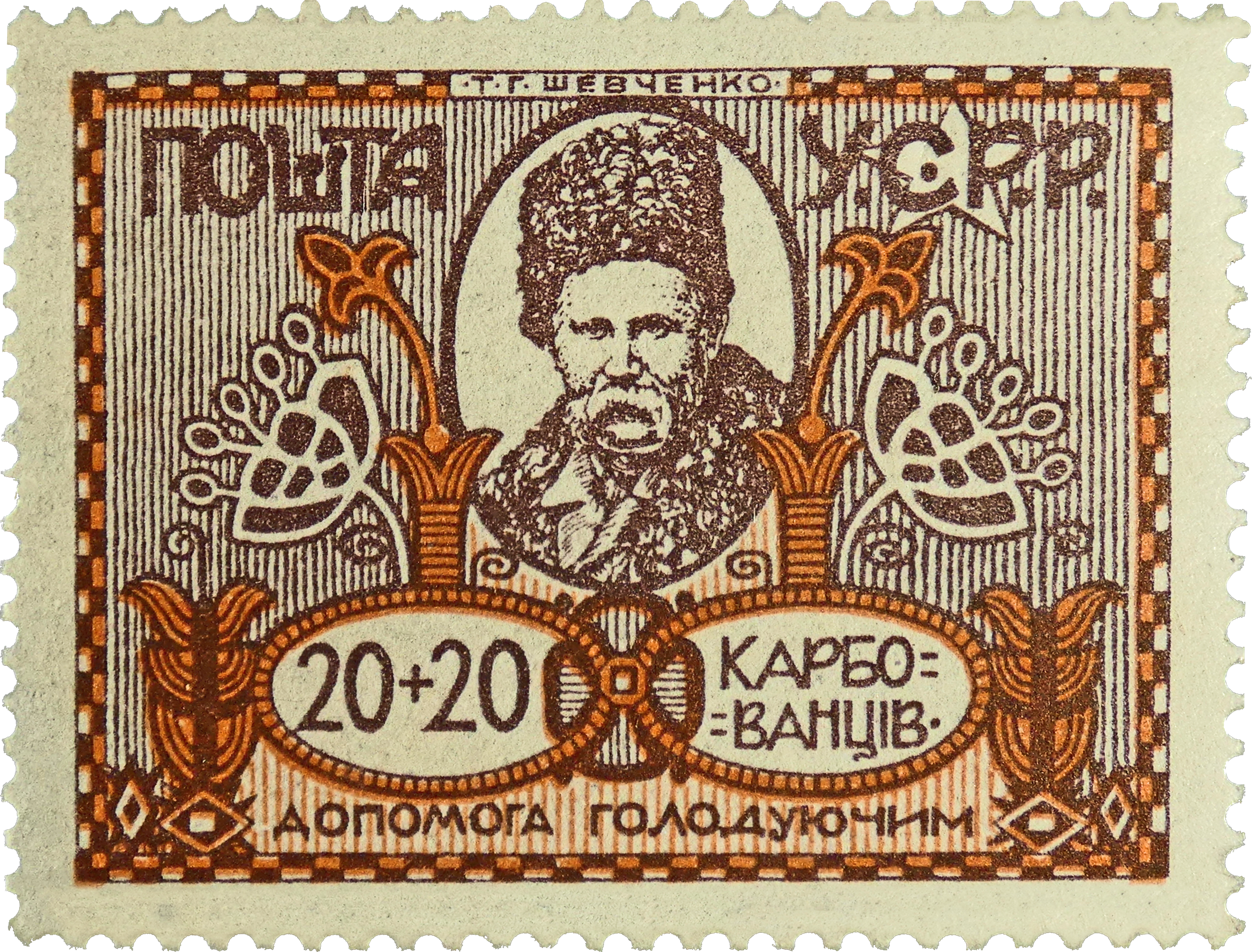
UkrSSR issue, 1923

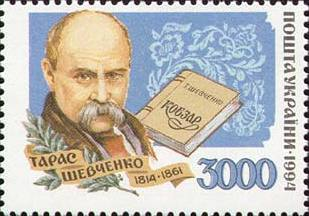
Ukraine issue, 1994

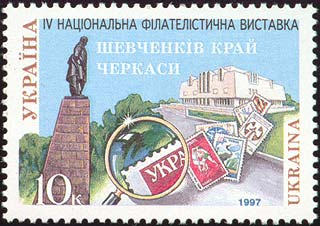
Ukraine issue, 1997

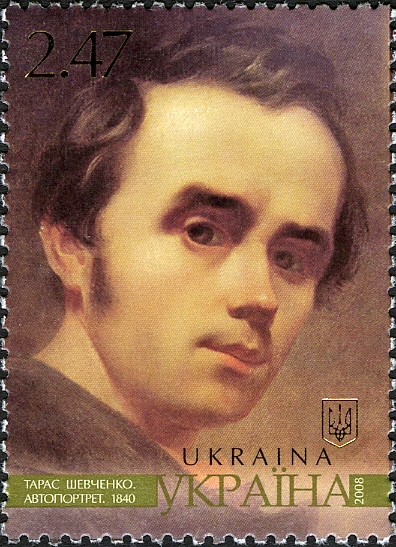
Ukraine issue, 2008

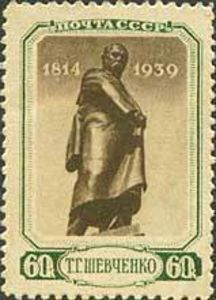
USSR issue, 1939

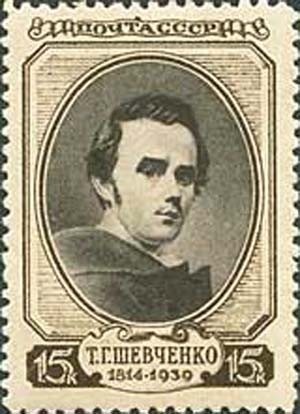
USSR issue, 1939

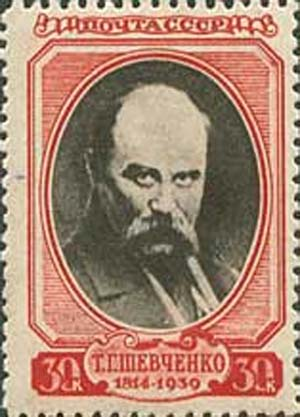
USSR issue, 1939

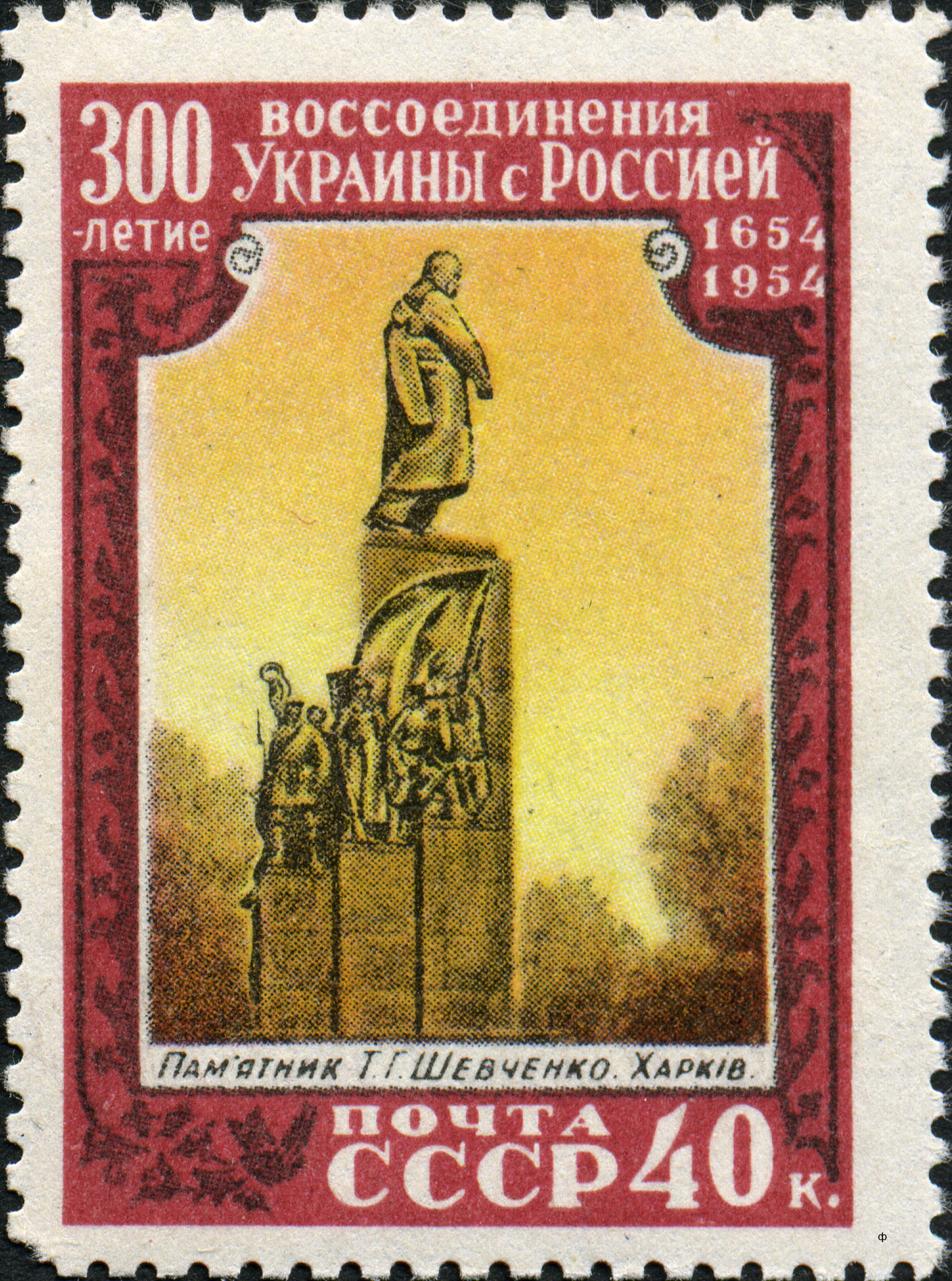
USSR issue, 1954

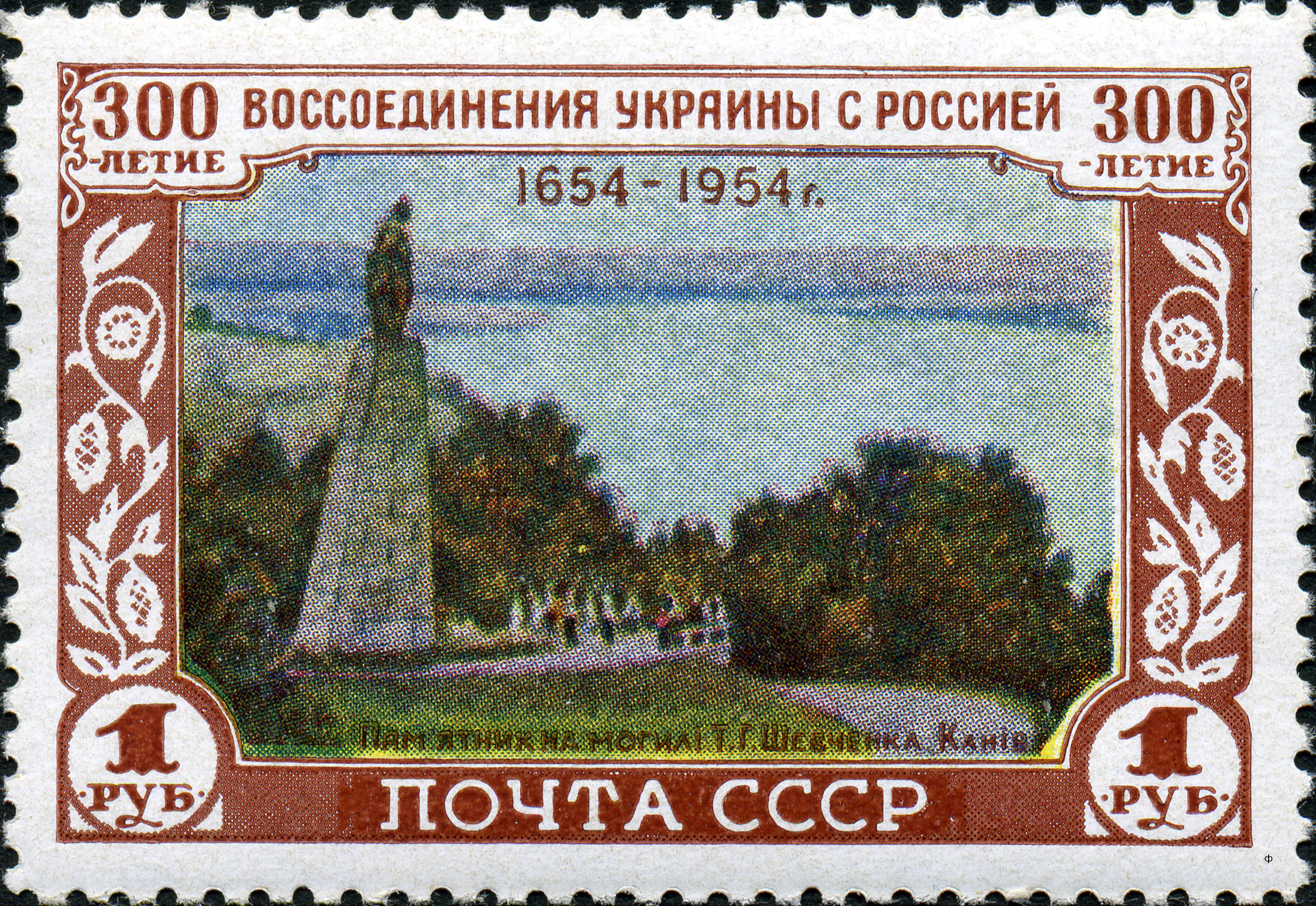
USSR issue, 1954

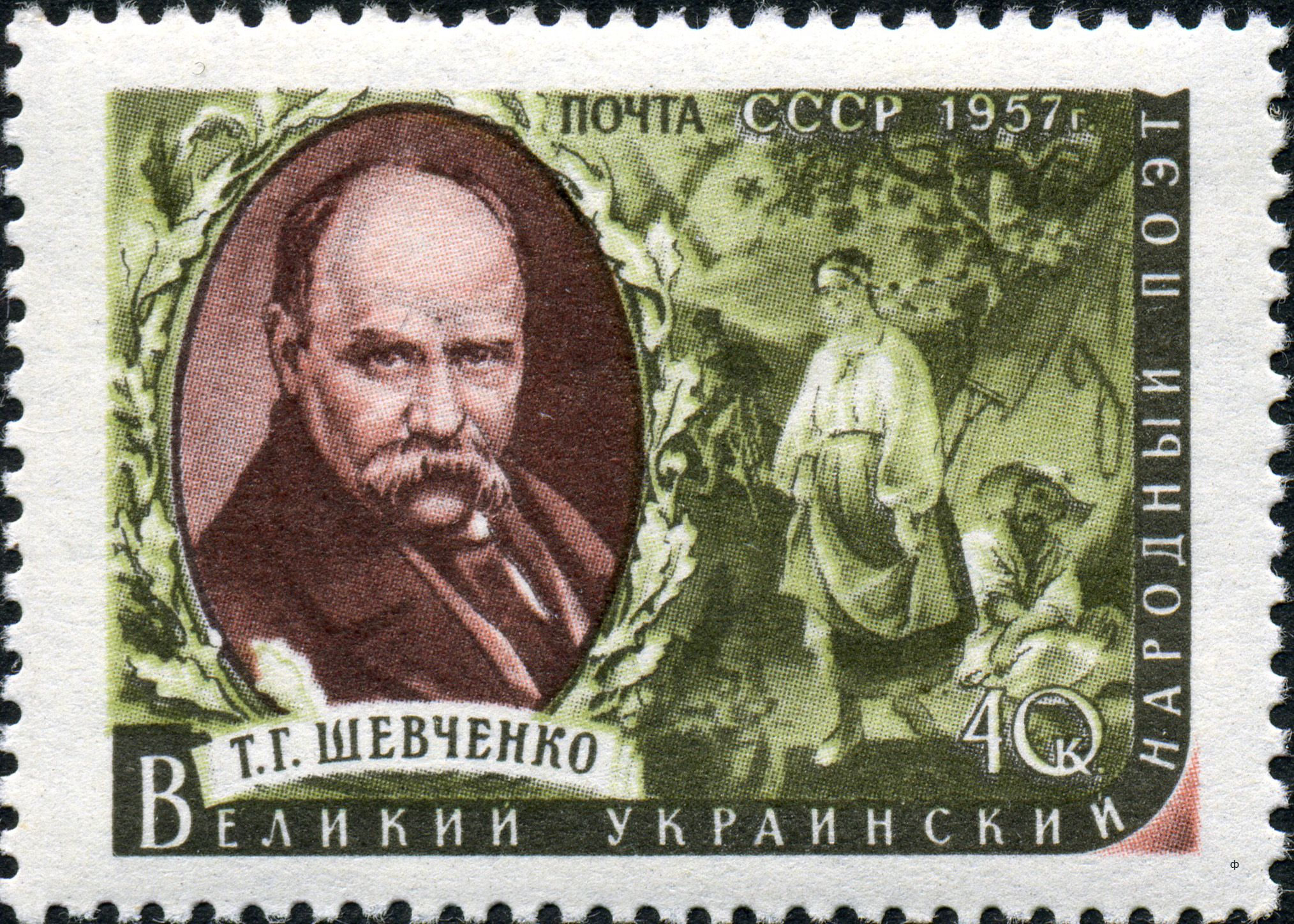
USSR issue, 1957

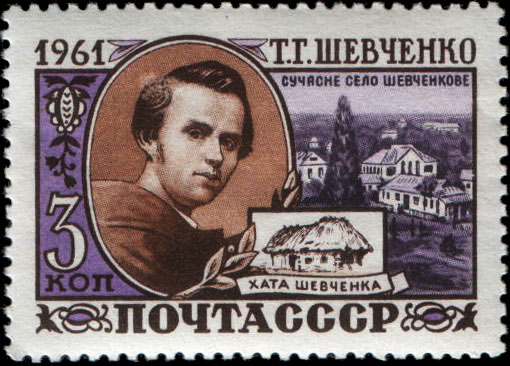
USSR issue, 1961

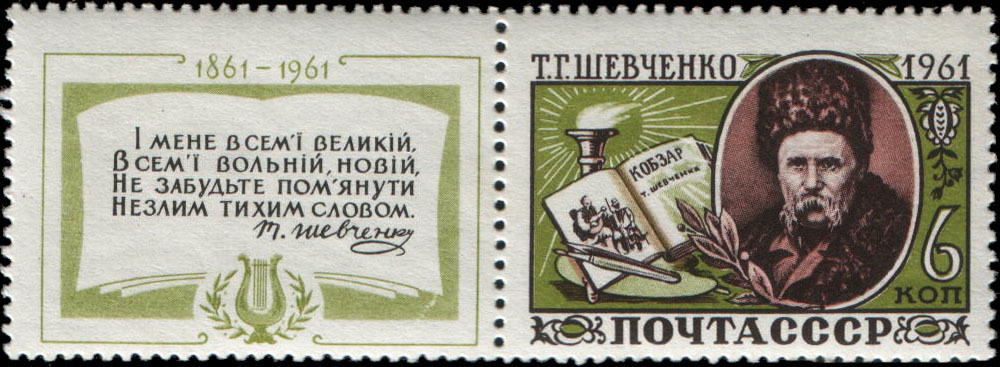
USSR issue, 1961

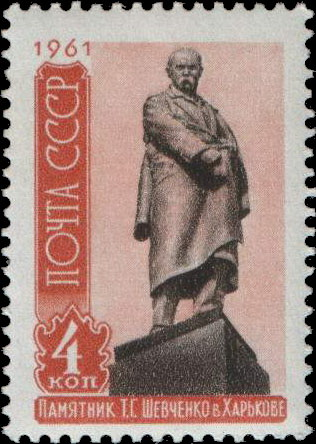
USSR issue, 1961

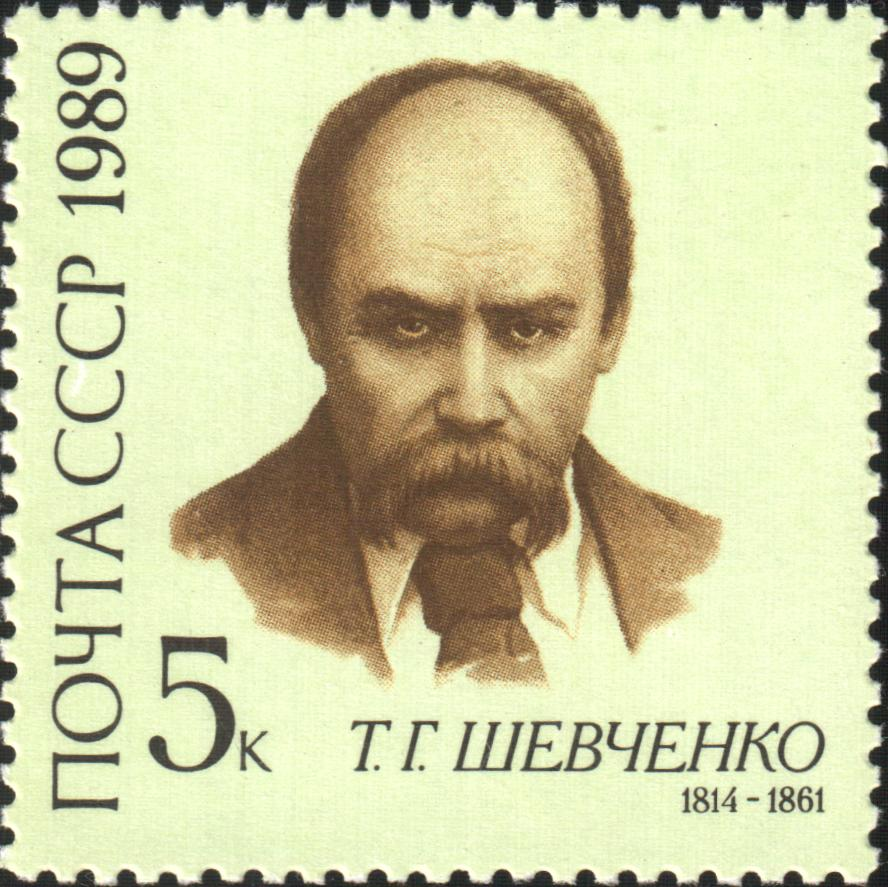
USSR issue, 1989

== See also ==
- Taras Shevchenko
