= Orsk Pedagogical Institute =

- Орский педагогический институт
- Active: September 8, 1937–May 27, 1998
- Location: Orsk, Russia
- Language: Russian

The Orsk State Pedagogical Institute (Russian: Орский педагогический институт) named after Taras Shevchenko is a pedagogical institution of higher education founded on 8 September 1937 and included on 27 May 1998 as part of Orenburg State University.

== History ==
On 8 September 1937, by order of the People's Commissariat for Education of the RSFSR No. 1578, a pedagogical school was founded in the city of Orsk. The term of study at the school was three years, the composition of the teaching staff consisted of sixteen teachers, the first set of students consisted of one hundred and nineteen students. In 1943, during the Great Patriotic War, the number of teachers was twenty people, the number of students was two hundred and nine students studying in two shifts.

On 1 August 1949, by Order of the Minister of Education of the RSFSR No. 479, the Orsk Teachers' Institute was established on the basis of the Pedagogical College to train teachers of secondary schools. The term of study was two years, the structure of the institute included three faculties.

On 11 April 1952, by Order of the Ministry of Education of the RSFSR No. 277, the Orsk Teachers' Institute was reorganized into the Orsk State Pedagogical Institute, consisting of two faculties: physics and mathematics and philology (for training teachers of the Russian language with the right to teach a foreign language). In 1952, the Department of Physical Education was created. In 1959, the Faculty of Pedagogy and Methods of Primary Education appeared as part of the institute, in 1962 - the Faculty of Foreign Languages, in 1982 - the Faculty of Labor Training and in 1992 - the Faculty of Preschool Pedagogy and Psychology.

Since 1956, the Institute began to publish "Scientific Notes of the Orsk State Pedagogical Institute". In 1961, by the Decree of the Council of Ministers of the RSFSR No. 263, the Orsk State Pedagogical Institute was named after the Ukrainian poet, prose writer, thinker, ethnographer and public figure Taras Shevchenko. From 1937 to 1998, OGPI named after T. Shevchenko trained tens of thousands of teachers for primary and secondary general education schools.

On May 27, 1998, by Order of the Government of the Russian Federation No. 608-r and Order of the Ministry of Education of the Russian Federation No. 1728, T. Shevchenko OGPI was merged with the Orsk branch of the All-Union Correspondence Polytechnic Institute and the creation on their basis of the Orsk Humanitarian and Technological Institute, as a branch included in the Orenburg State University.

== Management ==
- Pavel Ivanovich Solovyov (1937-1941)
- Danil Moiseevich Skuratovsky (1941-1945)
- Pavel Alexandrovich Arkhangelsky (1945-1947)
- Sergei Petrovich Bukin (1947-1949)
- Fyodor Konstantinovich Alimov (1949-1952)
- Alexander Fedorovich Parkhomenko (1952-1962)
- Viktor Nikolaevich Yantsen (1976-1992)
- Gennady Anatolyevich Melekesov (1992-1998)

== Literature ==
- Орская городская энциклопедия / гл. ред.-сост. П. С. Коровин. — Оренбург : Южный Урал, 2007.
- Мелекесов Г. А., Янцен В. Н. Орский пединститут и образование Восточного Оренбуржья // Образование в Оренбуржье : История и современность : мат. науч.-практ. конф. 13-14 марта 1997 г. / отв. за вып. К. Ф. Волкова. — Оренбург : ОГПУ, 1997. – С. 84–85.
