= State Research Institution "Encyclopedia Press" =

Ukrainian publication

State Research Institution "Encyclopedia Press" (Ukrainian: Державна наукова установа «Енциклопедичне видавництво») is the Ukrainian publisher of encyclopedic, reference, dictionary literature. Its former names were: the Main Editorial Office of the Ukrainian Soviet Encyclopedia (1959–1989) and the Mykola Bazhan All-Ukrainian State Specialized Publisher "Ukrainian Encyclopedia" (Ukrainian: Всеукраїнське державне спеціалізоване видавництво «Українська енциклопедія» імені М. П. Бажана) (1989–2013). It operates in Kyiv since 1957.

== Description ==
The "Ukrainian Encyclopedia" publisher is the successor of publishers "Ukrainian Soviet Encyclopedia" (1930–34) and "Main Edition of the Ukrainian Soviet Encyclopedia" (1957–89). In 1989 based on the last it was created through reorganization under the name "Mykola Bazhan Ukrainian Soviet Encyclopedia" at first and in 1991 the word "Soviet" was omitted from the name.

The book-publishing institution was administered through the State Committee of the Ukrainian SSR on issues of publishing, polygraphy, and book-marketing and later its successors (Ministry of Press and Information of Ukraine, abbreviated as DerzhInform in Ukrainian) that today are part of the State Committee in Television and Radio-broadcasting.

The publisher also operates the Main Edition of the Collection of historical and cultural monuments of Ukraine.

According to the decree of the president of Ukraine of January 2, 2013, there should be created state science institution "Mykola Bazhan Encyclopedic Publisher" through the organization of the whole publishing house.

=== Publications ===
Since 1989 there were over 50 publications released by the publisher.

- Ukrainian Literature Encyclopedia (1988-1995, released 3 out 5 volumes)
- Geographic Encyclopedia of Ukraine (1989-1993)
- Health of Mother and Child (1992, in Russian)
- Art of Ukraine (1995, released 1 out 5 volumes)
- Juridical Encyclopedia (1998-2004)
- Ukrainian Language (2000–07)
- Encyclopedic guide "Land of Chernihiv" (1990)
- Encyclopedic guide "Land of Poltava" (1992)
- Encyclopedic guide "Artists of Ukraine" (1992)
- Encyclopedic guide "Streets of Kyiv" (1995)
- Biographical guide "Art of Ukraine" (1997)
- Red Book of Ukraine (1994–98)
- "Sexual diseases" (1994, along with AST-Press, in Russian)
- "Practical homeopathic pharmacology" (1990–92, in Russian)
- "Alive world of heraldry: Animals and plants in state emblem" (1997)
- series "Bibliotheque of the Ukrainian Literary Encyclopedia: heights of writing" include selective works number of famous writers: Maksym Rylsky, Mykola Bazhan, and others

== Main Edition of the Ukrainian Soviet Encyclopedia ==
In 1944 there was intent to reinstate the publishing and the Council of People's Commissars of the Ukrainian SSR issued a decree on creation of the publishing Ukrainian Soviet Encyclopedia. In 1947, however, the project was scratched, and the institution was dissolved. It was not until 1956 when the world saw publishing of the Encyclopedia of Ukrainian Studies by Volodymyr Kubiyovych who was director of the Shevchenko Scientific Society (Europe). After that, the leadership of the Communist Party of Ukraine finally decided to realize the idea of publishing the Ukrainian Encyclopedia. It took place on December 17, 1957.

In 1957-1974, the Ukrainian Soviet Encyclopedia, under direct administration of the Academy of Sciences of the Ukrainian SSR. From 1974, it was part of the State Committee of the Ukrainian SSR on publishing.

- Landmark collection on history and culture of the Ukrainian SSR
- Book of Memory of Ukraine

=== Directors ===
- 1957 - 1983 Mykola Bazhan
- 1983 - 1986 Anatoliy Kudrytskyi
- 1986 - 1989 Fedir Babychev

=== Publications ===
From 1957 to 1989 the publishing released over 150 publications.

- Ukrainian Soviet Encyclopedia (1st ed. 1959–1965, 17 volumes; second ed. 1977–1984, 12 volumes)
- Ukrainian Soviet Encyclopedic Dictionary (1st ed. 1964–1967, 3 volumes; second ed. 1986–1987, 3 volumes)
- Soviet Encyclopedia of History of Ukraine (1969–1972, 4 volumes)
- Encyclopedia of National Economy of the Ukrainian SSR (1969–1972, 4 volumes)
- Ukrainian Agricultural Encyclopedia (1970–1972, 3 volumes)
- Encyclopedia of Cybernetics (1973 in Ukrainian; 1974 in Russian)
- Political dictionary (1971)
- Economical dictionary (1973)
- Philosophical dictionary (1973)
- Dictionary of Artists of Ukraine (1973)
- Juridical dictionary (1974)
- Biological dictionary (1974)
- Shevchenko's dictionary (1976–1977, 2 volumes)
- Dictionary on cybernetics (1979 in Russian)
- History of the Ukrainian Art (1966–1973, 6 volumes)
- History of the Academy of Sciences of the Ukrainian SSR (1967, 2 volumes)
- History of the Academy of Sciences of the Ukrainian SSR (1979 in Russian)
- History of cities and villages of the Ukrainian SSR (1967–1974, 26 volumes)
- Dictionary of foreign words (1st ed. 1974, second ed. 1985)
- Historical-architectural guide "In people's memory" (1st ed. 1975 in Ukrainian; second ed. 1985 in Russian)
- Encyclopedic guide "Kyiv" (1st ed. 1981 in Ukrainian, 1982 in Russian; second ed. 1985 in Ukrainian, 1986 in Russian)
- Kyiv: historical overview in maps, illustrations, and documents (1982)
- Encyclopedic guide "Medical Herbs" (1988)

== See also ==
- List of publishing companies of Ukraine
