= Ukraine: A Concise Encyclopaedia =

Shevchenko Scientific Society publication

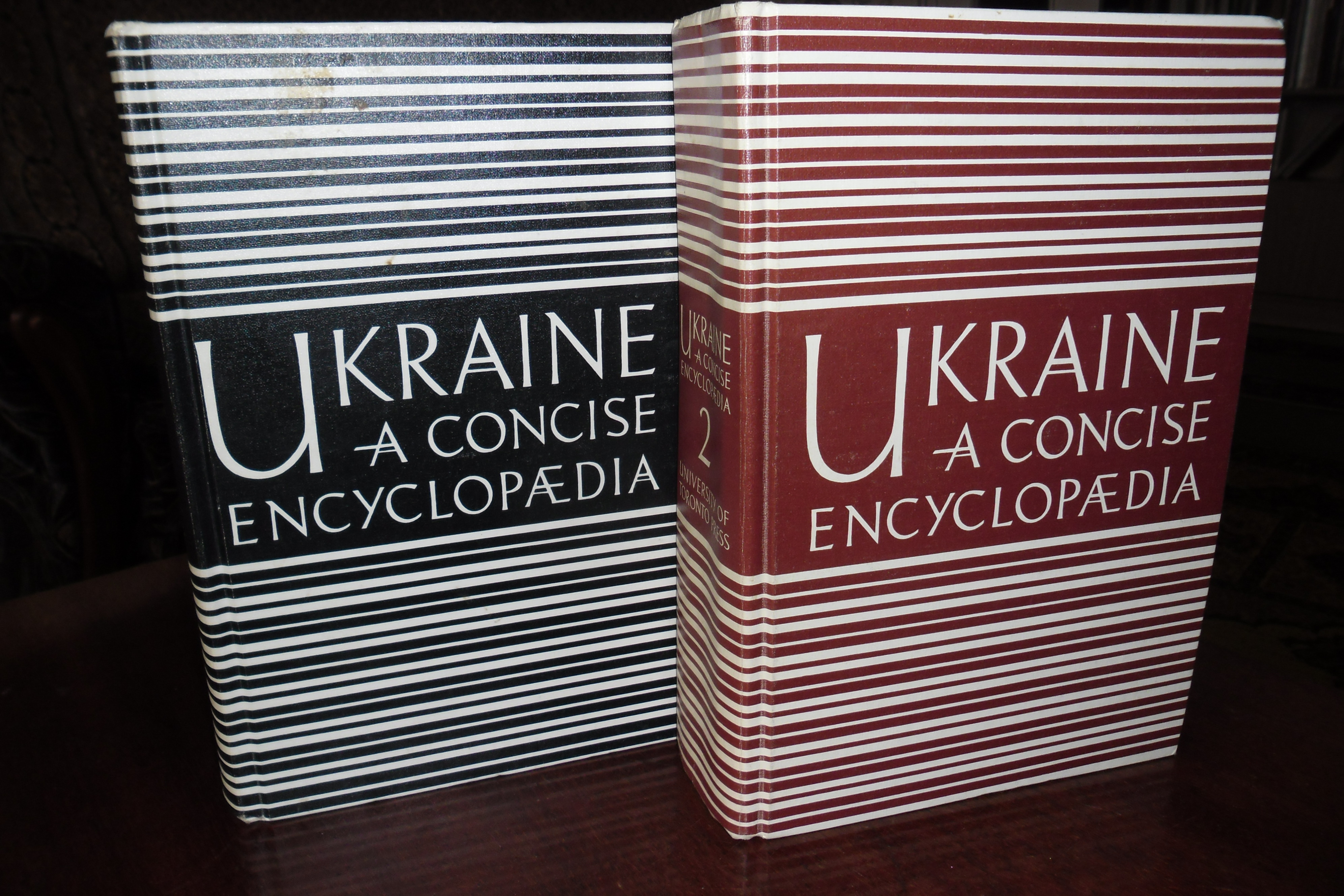
Covers of the 2-volume set.

Ukraine: A Concise Encyclopaedia is a Ukrainian English-language encyclopaedia in 2 volumes. The encyclopaedia was published in Toronto (Canada) by Toronto University Press and the Ukrainian National Association in 1969. It was prepared by the Shevchenko Scientific Society, the editor-in-chief was Volodymyr Kubiyovych.

== Content ==
Ukraine: A Concise Encyclopaedia is an English translation of the thematic part of the Entsyklopediia ukrainoznavstva (which was originally published in 1949). It was revised, and supplemented with up-to-date material by a number of research scholars from the US and Canada.

The encyclopaedia consists of:

- Volume 1 — 1186 pages
- Volume 2 — 1394 pages

Volume 1 covers Ukrainian subjects including: history, demography, geography, language, and literature.

Volume 2 covers Ukrainian subjects including: law and jurisprudence, churches, scholarship and education, libraries, archives, museums, architecture, sculpture, painting, graphic arts, music choreography, theater, cinema, publishing, media, economy, health and medicine, armed forces, and the Ukrainian diaspora.

A new revised and expanded English-language edition of the great ten-volume alphabetic part was published under the title Encyclopedia of Ukraine in Canada in the 1980s and 1990s, and was only completed after Kubiyovych's death. It is presently being put on-line.

== See also ==
- Encyclopedia of Ukraine
- Encyclopedia of Modern Ukraine
- Ukrainian Soviet Encyclopedia

== External links. ==
- Ukraine: A Concise Encyclopedia (Books Google)
