= Sich (scouting) =

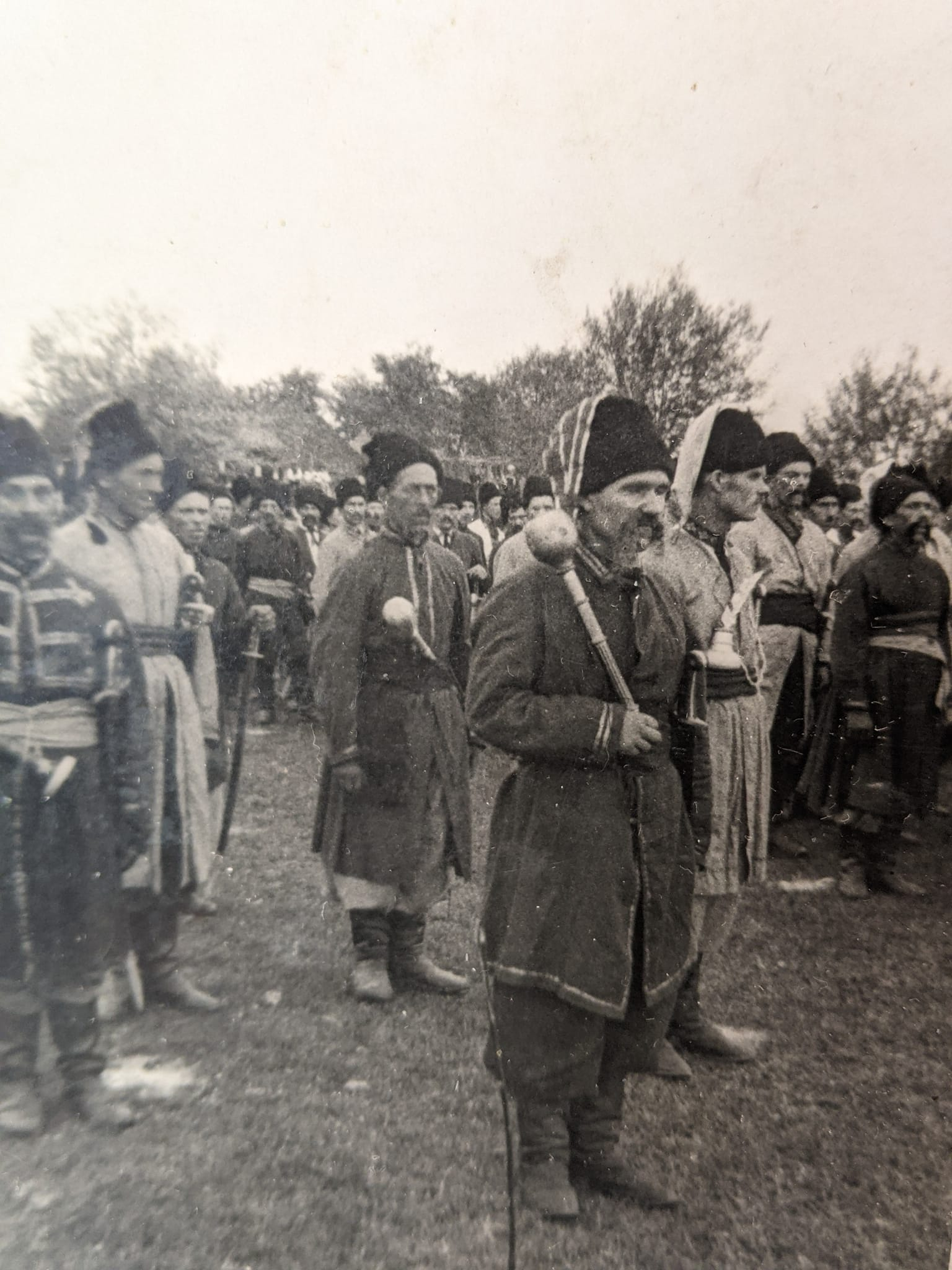
The Sixth Sich Festival in Snyatyn (Balka, 12 July 1912).

Sich (Ukrainian: Січ) was a Ukrainian sporting society which operated in Galicia between 1900 and 1930 and spread its activities to the regions of Bukovina, Transcarpathia and into the Ukrainian diaspora. It played an important role in Ukrainian history, serving as a base for the Legion of Ukrainian Sich Riflemen.

== History ==
=== Predecessors ===
A number of Ukrainian student organizations bearing the name "Sich" emerged starting from the 1860s, operating in Lviv, Chernivtsi, Vienna and Graz. The Lviv organization supported Populist views, with its members wearing folk and Cossack clothing and dedicating themselves to the study of history, literature and folklore. The Vienna organization was established in 1868 by students from Galicia and played a particularly important role in the Ukrainian national revival in lands ruled by Austria-Hungary. Among its members were such prominent personalities as Anatole Vakhnianyn, Ivan Pului, Ivan Horbachevsky, Myron Korduba, Zenon Kuzelia and others. The society helped to spread the ideas of Mykhailo Drahomanov, supported the Union for the Liberation of Ukraine and organized protests against the Pacification in Galicia. Following the Soviet occupation of Vienna its head S. Naklovych was deported to Siberia, and most other members left the city.

=== In Galicia ===
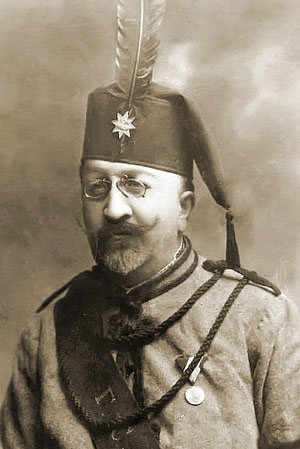
Kyrylo Trylyovsky

The first branch of Sich as a sportive and firefighting organization was established on 5 May 1900 in the village of Zavallia near Sniatyn, Pokutia by Kyrylo Trylyovsky, who became honoured as the "Sich Father". During the following years the society spread around Kolomyia and Horodenka districts, and soon became active in the whole territory of Galicia and Bukovina. In 1908 the central office of Sich was established in Stanislaviv under the name of Main Sich Committee; in 1912 it moved to Lviv and became known as the Ukrainian Sich Union. Many leaders of the organization were members of the Ukrainian Radical Party. By 1913 Sich had over 900 branches with more than 80,000 members.

The first congress of Sich was organized in 1902 in Kolomyia, followed by several such events, with the largest ones taking place in Stanislaviv (1911) and Sniatyn (1912). The biggest convention, the so-called "Shevchenko Congress" (Шевченківський здвиг) was organized on 28 June 1914 in Lviv to celebrate the 100th anniversary from the birth of Taras Shevchenko and involved around 12,000 participants, including members of Sich, Sokol, Plast, Ukrainian Sich Riflemen and other organizations. Members of Czech, Croat and Slovene sports societies also took part in Sich congresses. Following the establishment of Ukrainian Sich Riflemen, in March 1913 a sharpshooting section was founded at the Sich society, contributing to the development of Ukrainian paramilitary organizations. In August 1914 members of the Sich took part in creation of the voluntary Legion of Ukrainian Sich Riflemen.

Following the end of World War I, the activities of Sich resumed in many parts of Galicia. However, in 1924 most branches of the organization were closed down by Polish authorities. The last branch of Sich survived until 1930 in the village of Horbachi near Lviv. The organization's partial successor was the Luh ("Meadow") sports society.

=== In other Ukrainian territories ===
The first branch of Sich society in Bukovina was founded in 1903 in Kitsman. In 1904 a central office of the organization was established in Chernivtsi, and by 1912 it had 112 branches around the region. In summer 1908 a regional congress of Sich took place in Chernivtsi. After the Romanian occupation of Bukovina the organization was banned.

In Central Ukraine Sich first became active in 1918. In February 1919 a Sich committee was established by Trylyovsky and O. Andriyevsky in Vinnytsia, and in autumn a branch of the organization was established in Kamianets-Podilskyi. However, the movement's development was suppressed by the Soviet occupation. Trylyovsky moved his activities to Transcarpathia, and in 1920 founded a Sich committee in Uzhhorod. A branch of the organization established by Klympush brothers in Yasinia became a base for the Carpathian Sich, which existed in 1938–1939.

=== In the diaspora ===
In 1915 a sports department affiliated with the Ukrainian Sich Riflemen was established in New York City, and in 1916 the Central Sich Organization of Ukrainians in the USA was founded . By 1920 it united around 60 branches with 3,000 members. In addition to sports, the American branches of the Sich provided military training, conducted publishing activities and were active in trade. With time, the Sich movement in the USA split into several branches with various political affiliations. The Canadian Sich was initially affiliated with the American counterpart, but later joined the branch connected to the Hetman movement.

In Western Europe the first Sich organization was established by Ukrainian workers in Hamburg in 1912. In 1921 a Sich society was established in Vienna, and in 1926-1927 new branches emerged in Podebrady and Prague. Members of the movement took part in the International Workers' Olympiads in Prague (1927) and Vienna (1931).

== Ideology and activities ==
Unlike the contemporary Sokil movement, which had a pan-Slavic character, Sich had a clear national orientation. Its members adopted as system of Cossack ranks, such as kish otaman and osavul, and emphasized their connection to historical tradition, with the organization's name relating to the Zaporozhian Sich. The activities of Sich contributed to the spread of Ukrainian national consciousness in the regions of Galicia and Bukovina. In 1914 members of the Sich published a handbook for training of infantry soldiers. The organization also issued songbooks, calendars and a number of periodicals. Branches of the Sich supported the development of Ukrainian cooperative movement, engaged in education of the youth and organized firefighting activities. A Hutsul theatre troupe was established on the base of a Sich branch by Hnat Khotkevych in 1910, and during the following years it toured Galicia and Dnieper Ukraine, and even gave a performance in Moscow.

== Uniforms ==
Initially members of the organization would distinguish themselves by wearing Ukrainian folk clothing, but starting from 1910 a common uniform was adopted. Every member of Sich wore a crimson band bearing the name of the local branch, and carried a Hutsul shepherd's axe (topirets). Every local division of the organization had its own banner.

== Anthem ==
The society's anthem Гей там на горі Січ іде! (Hey, on the mountain Sich is coming!) was written by Tryliovsky himself and first published in 1904 in Kolomyia. Two years later notes were added as part of a new publication. Musicologists consider the tune of the march to be close to wedding songs. It soon entered the repertoire of Ukrainian Sich Riflemen and was published in their songbooks from 1916 and 1918. The song spread to Transcarpathia, as well as to Dnieper Ukraine, where it was known as "Zaporizhian March".

During the Interwar period the song became popular among members of various youth organizations in Galicia, and composer Yaroslav Yaroslavenko produced his own arrangement of the anthem. The song was also used by members of the Ukrainian Insurgent Army. In our times it is frequently performed in Western Ukraine as part of Independence Day celebrations.

== See also ==
- Scouting in Ukraine
