= Jaroslaw Padoch =

Jaroslaw Padoch (in articles of the "Encyclopedia of Ukraine" as Yaroslav Padokh) (Ukrainian: Ярослав Миколайович Падох, December 14, 1908, Buchach, Kingdom of Galicia and Lodomeria, now Ternopil Oblast, Ukraine — August 28, 1998, New York City, United States) — was a Ukrainian Member of the Shevchenko Scientific Society. He was President of the Shevchenko Scientific Society in the United States and President of the Shevchenko Scientific Society's World Council from 1982 to 1992.

He was buried at the cemetery of St. Andrew the First-Called Apostle in South Bound Brook, New Jersey.

Jaroslaw Padoch had a wife Irena (née Germak) and two daughters: Maya Liteplo and Christine Padoch. Christine Padoch is the author of the book Migration and its alternatives among the Iban of Sarawak (1982) and other works on the anthropology of Borneo and Amazonia.

== Works ==
He is the author of articles in the Encyclopedia of Ukraine:

- Ruskaia Pravda. // Encyclopedia of Ukraine. Vol. 4. 1993.
- With Andrii Yakovliv, Boyars in the Encyclopedia of Ukraine, vol. 1 (1984).
- Chubaty, Mykola in the Internet Encyclopedia of Ukraine

== Sources ==
- (in Ukrainian) Х. Весна, Б. Головин. Падох Ярослав Миколайович // Тернопільський енциклопедичний словник : у 4 т. / редкол.: Г. Яворський та ін. — Тернопіль : Видавничо-поліграфічний комбінат «Збруч», 2008. — Т. 3 : П — Я. — 708 с. — C. 12. ISBN 978-966-528-279-2.
