= Encyclopedia of Modern Ukraine =

General-knowledge English-language encyclopaedia

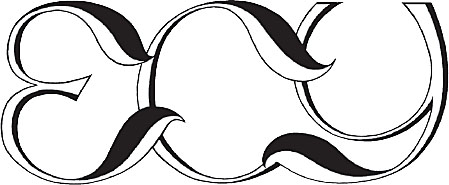
- Encyclopedia's logo
- Editors: Ivan Dziuba, et al.
- Language: Ukrainian
- Subject: General
- Genre: encyclopedia
- Publisher: NASU Institute of Encyclopaedic Research
- Publication date: 2001–present (printed version), 2014–present (online version)
- Publication place: Ukraine
- Media type: printed and online versions
- ISBN: 966-02-2074-X
- Website: https://esu.com.ua

The Encyclopedia of Modern Ukraine (Ukrainian: Енциклопедія Сучасної України (ЕСУ), romanized: Entsyklopediia Suchasnoi Ukrainy (ESU)), abbreviated EMU, is a multi-volume national encyclopedia of Ukraine. It is an academic project of the Institute of Encyclopaedic Research of the National Academy of Sciences of Ukraine. Today, the reference work is available in a print edition and online.

The EMU provides an integral image of modern Ukraine describing events, institutions, organizations, activities, notions and people from the early 20th century to the present. It embraces all spheres of life in Ukraine, and reflects current views on historical events and personalities.

== Paper edition ==
A first edition has been in progress. 30 volumes are planned — by 2022 24 volumes had been published and it has already become the most comprehensive paper encyclopedia on Ukraine to date.

Published volumes are co-edited by Ivan Dziuba, Arkadii Zhukovskyi, Oleh Romaniv, Mykola Zhelezniak; assisted by over 20 famous Ukrainian scientists including Borys Paton; written by over 1000 contributing experts, and compiled by editorial staff (10 professionals).

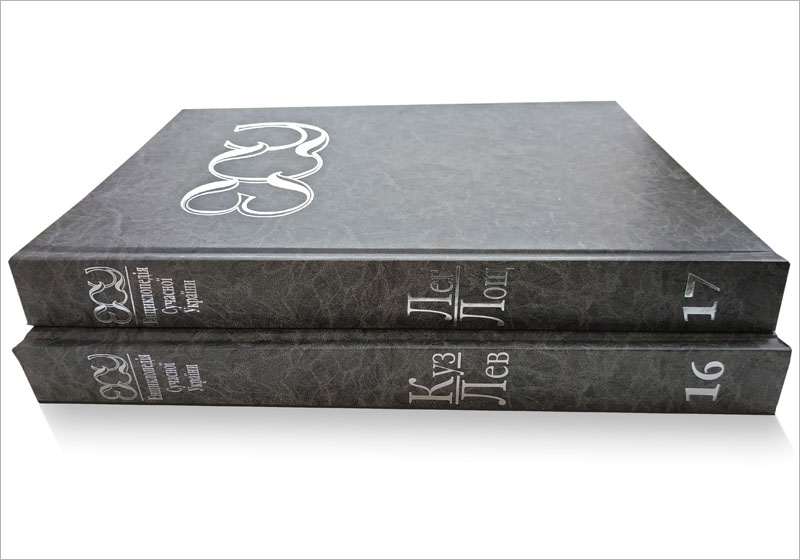
16 & 17 volumes

The EMU has repeatedly held leading places in the 'Book of the Year' Ukrainian national rating, it was awarded numerous diplomas, in particular, in 2003 it became a laureate of the "Person of the Year-2002" Ukrainian national program in the category "Cultural Project of the Year ".

Previously it was planned the EMU will form the basis for the national multi-volume Ukrainian Universal Encyclopaedia, a common project of the National Academy of Sciences of Ukraine and the Shevchenko Scientific Society.

== Online encyclopedia ==
The EMU debuted online to the public for free in October 2014 and still continues to be a work in progress. The website averages about 235 thousand unique visitors per month, and over 2.8 million per year. The website receives traffic from all over the world but primarily from Ukraine. Articles on the encyclopedia's website are topically tagged. The online format of the project lends itself to developing timely and relevant content for all users.

== See also ==
- Encyclopedia of Ukraine
- Ukraine: A Concise Encyclopaedia
- Ukrainian Soviet Encyclopedia
