= Ukrainian Soviet Encyclopedia =

Encyclopedia of Ukraine

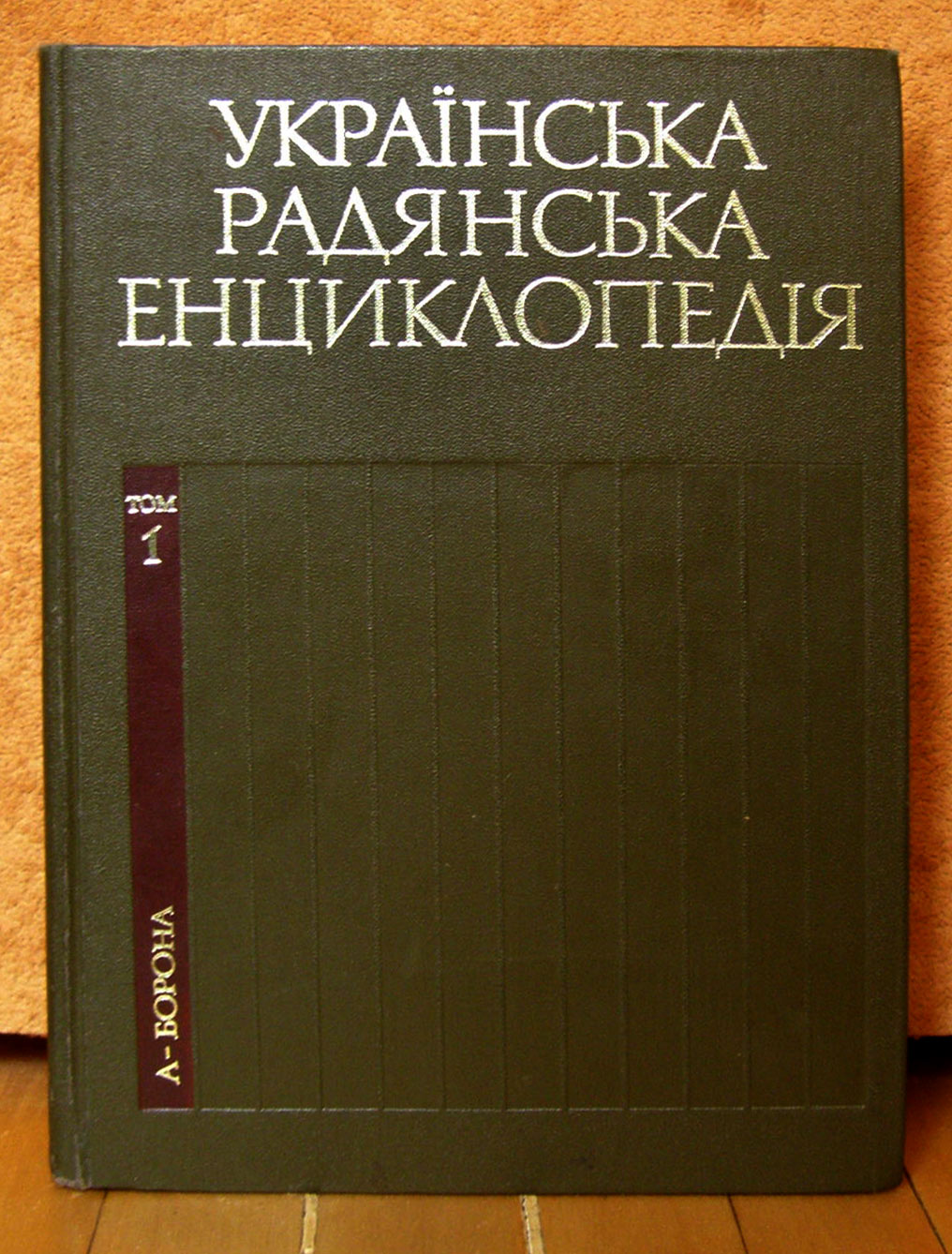
- Language: Ukrainian
- Subject: General
- Genre: Reference encyclopaedia
- Publication place: Ukrainian SSR, USSR

The Ukrainian Soviet Encyclopedia (Ukrainian: Українська радянська енциклопедія, romanized: Ukrainska radianska entsyklopediia) was a multi-purpose encyclopedia of Ukraine, issued in the USSR.

== First attempt ==
Following the publication of the first volume of the Ukrainian General Encyclopedia in Lviv, then in Poland, in 1930, the Ukrainian Soviet Encyclopedia (USE) was commissioned by Mykola Skrypnyk. During his chairmanship in Kharkiv the editorial board of the USE was established, enlisting the help of over 100 professionals. Printing began in early 1933, but Moscow censors decried the encyclopedia as being nationalist. Of the 20 planned volumes only three were produced. In the same year Skrypnyk committed suicide, and was succeeded by Volodymyr Zatonsky. The printed copies were destroyed, and plans for the November 1934 edition of USE dissolved.

== First edition ==
In early 1948, interest in the USE returned as a response the publication of the Encyclopedia of Ukrainian Studies by Volodymyr Kubijovyč; an attempt to preserve a Ukrainian national heritage believed to be under threat by the Soviet regime in Ukraine. However work did not resume until after the death of Stalin. From 1959 to 1965 the first edition of the USE was published spanning 17 volumes with more than 45,000 articles. The foreword stated that the URE "should show fraternal unity of the people with the Russian and all other peoples of the Soviet Motherland" and that it is against "Ukrainian bourgeois nationalism", a reference to the Encyclopedia of Ukrainian Studies. Russian and English translations of the first edition were published in 1969.

== Second edition ==
In 1974 the second edition of the USE began publishing, finishing in 1985. A full Russian translation began in 1978. The publication consisted of 12 volumes with over 50,000 articles (most of the reduced number of volumes can be explained by the increase in the number of columns per page from 2 to 3) The editor of both publications was writer Mykola Bazhan. Content included sections on Ukrainian literature and artists and scientists of different origin who worked on the territory of Ukraine. The encyclopedia showed the heavy influence of Bolshevik ideology. For example, Language is given only six pages and "Religion and the Church" receives only three, while 25 pages are devoted to the CPSU. Historical figures in Ukrainian history such as Ivan Mazepa were not viewed positively, as to avoid brewing any nationalist sentiments. There are no articles on the ethnic groups of Ukraine.

== Ukrainian Soviet Encyclopedic Dictionary ==
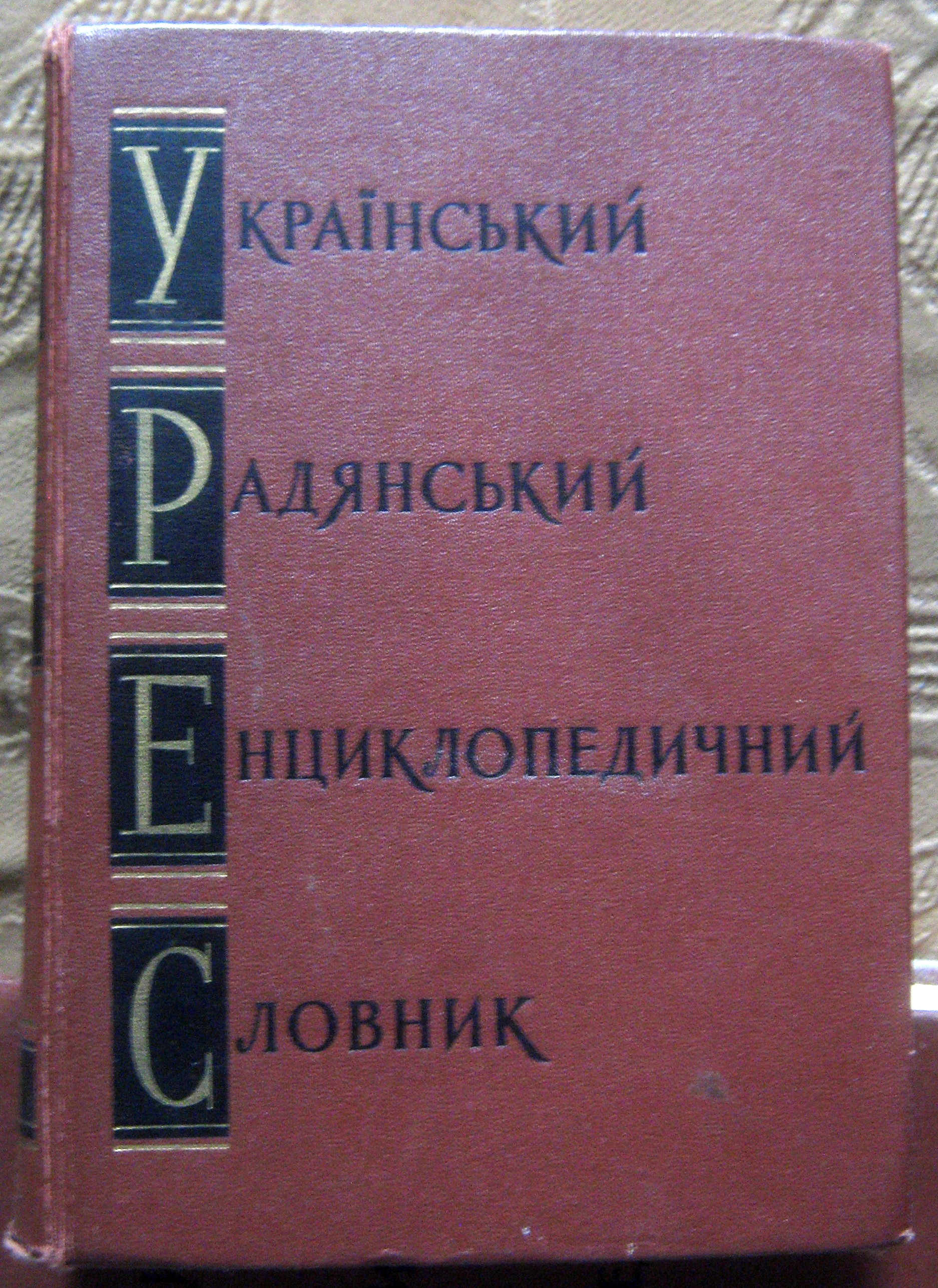
Cover of the first edition of Ukrainian Soviet Encyclopedic Dictionary

Ukrainian Soviet Encyclopedic Dictionary was a shortened variant of the Ukrainian Soviet Encyclopedia, which was also issued by the All-Ukrainian State Specialized Publisher "Ukrainian Encyclopedia". There were two editions of the dictionary and both contained three volumes. The first edition was published in 1966-68, and the second – 1986-87.

== See also ==
- Encyclopedia of Ukraine
- Encyclopedia of Modern Ukraine
- Ukraine. A Concise Encyclopedia
- Great Soviet Encyclopedia
