= Larissa Zaleska Onyshkevych =

Ukrainian scholar (born 1935)

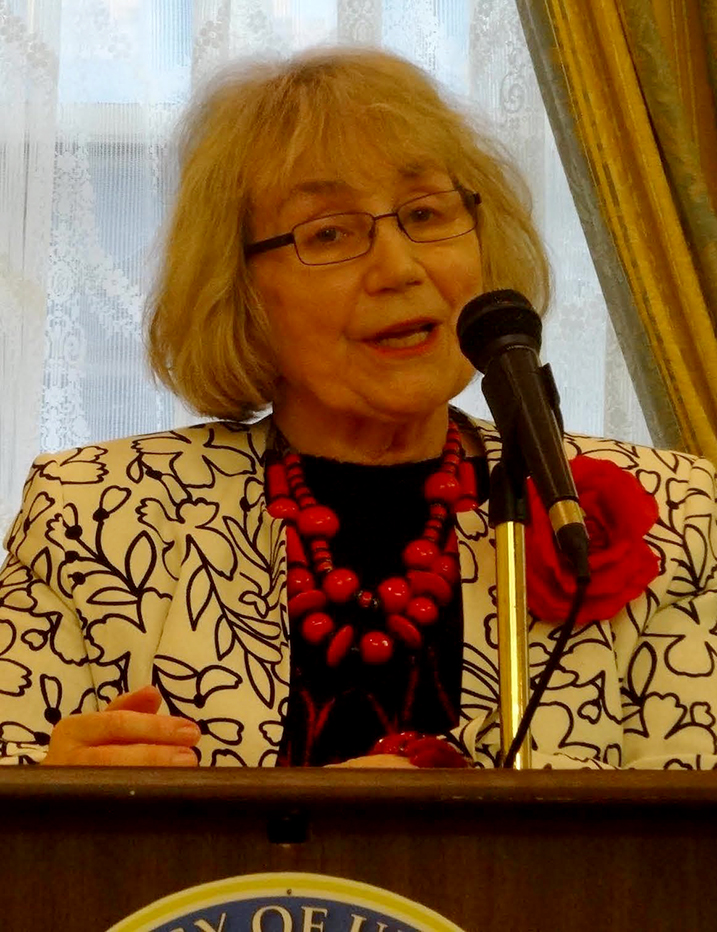
Larissa Zaleska Onyshkevych

Larissa Maria Lubov Zaleska Onyshkevych (Ukrainian: Лариса Марія Любов Залеська Онишкевич; born 12 May 1935) is a scholar of modern Ukrainian drama and literature. Most of her publications are on modern and postmodern Ukrainian drama, that she discusses in a comparative literature approach. Ukrainian poetry and prose, as well as issues of the Ukrainian language, are also topics of her interest.

== Personal ==
Larissa Zaleska was born in Stryi, Ukraine (1935 -). Her mother (Maria-Volodymyra Shankovska) was a teacher and painter, and father (Tadey Zalesky) was an educator, teaching Ukrainian and Latin in gymnasia and teachers colleges; he was a director of The Sambir Teachers College, and The Stryi Teachers College. In 1918 he was elected congressman of the Western Ukrainian National Republic (1918–1919).

== Education and professional life ==
She graduated from Humberside Collegiate Institute in Toronto, and the Royal Canadian Conservatory of Music in Toronto; studied chemistry at Ryerson Polytechnic Institute (grad. 1954), and then Slavic Studies at the University of Toronto (BA, with minors in Political Science and Anthropology, 1962). At the U. of Pennsylvania, she received an MA in Ukrainian language, and then a Ph.D. in Ukrainian literature (1973). She taught at Rutgers Univ. in New Brunswick, N.J., and later worked as an editor (Suchasnist and PRF Associates). She served as President of Princeton Research Forum and then President of the Shevchenko Scientific Society (USA)

She received many awards and grants (NDEA IV, IREX, ACLS, and a Fulbright Senior Scholar grant to teach in Ukraine. In 2001, she was granted an Honorary Doctorate by the Ivan Franko National University of Lviv; in 2015 she was awarded the Ivan Franko Medal by this university. Her book on Ukrainian Drama - Tekst I Hra- was the winner of the L. and P. Kovaliv Prize, in 2010.

== Professional Publications ==
Larissa Zaleska Onyshkevych is an author, compiler, and/or editor of 16 books in English and/or Ukrainian; author of chapters in books; editor of special issues/editions and periodicals; and author of close to 200 articles on comparative, Slavic, Ukrainian, and American drama, literature, language, and theater. She is also a translator of Ukrainian poetry into English, and literary theory into Ukrainian.

As a Ukrainian drama specialist, she has edited/compiled 6 books on the subject. Her anthologies of modern Ukrainian drama were the first such compilations in Ukrainian literature, and include: an English-language anthology of Ukrainian drama, a set of parallel volumes of plays in the two languages, as well as the first study and anthology of Ukrainian drama written by playwrights of the Ukrainian Diaspora in the West. A major selection of her studies of Ukrainian drama is collected in her volume Tekst I Hra [Text and Performance: Essays on Ukrainian Drama], 2009. In this conpendium, her studies are grouped as Texts and Interpretations. Under “Texts” she discusses modernism, postmodernism, existentialism, issues of identity, and themes of historical upheavals as they are reflected in specific plays. In Section II, fourteen Ukrainian playwrights and their plays (written between 1895 and 2002) are discussed in comparative aspects to other Western dramatic works. Section III deals with the presentation of various Ukrainians plays in Ukrainian and American theaters, while concentrating on the interpretations chosen by specific directors. Other sections deal with non-Ukrainian plays on Ukrainian themes, and publications on the Ukrainian theater and actors.

== Books on drama ==
- Existentialism in Modern Ukrainian Drama (U. of Pennsylvania Ph.D. Dissertation). (Ann Arbor: Dissertation Microfilms International, 1973).
- Blyzniata Shche Zustrinut’sia [The Twins Shall Meet Again: Anthology of Drama of the Ukrainian Diaspora] (Kyiv, Lyiv: Chas, 1997. ISBN 966-7007-04-9).
- Antolohiia Modernoї Ukraїns’koi Dramy [An Anthology of Modern Ukrainian Drama] (Toronto: CIUS Press, 1998. ISBN 1-895571-11-1).
- Holodomor: Dvi Dramy [Two Plays about the Holodomor Famine], (Kyiv: Smoloskyp, 2008. ISBN 978-966-1676-10-6).
- Tekst i Hra. Ukraїns’ka Moderna Drama [Text and Performance. Ukrainian Modern Drama], (Lviv: Litopys, 2009. ISBN 0-88054-143-1, ISBN 978-966-7007-73-7).
- An Anthology of Modern Ukrainian Drama (Toronto: CIUS Press, 2012). (Parallel volume to the 2008 Ukrainian language volume), (ISBN 978-1-894865-27-2).

== Memoirs ==
- Borders, Bombs, and …Two Right Shoes. World War II through the Eyes of a Ukrainian Child Refugee Survivor. (Memoir) Charleston, SC, 2016. (ISBN 0692746544. ISBN 9780692746547)
- Bomby, Hranytsi i Dva Pravi Cherevychky. Druha Svitova Viina Ochyma Dytyny-Bizhentsia. [Bombs, Borders and Two Right Shoes. World War Two through the Eyes of a Refugee Child]. Memoir translated by the author. Lviv:Litopys, 2018. (ISBN 978-966-8853-73-9)

== Editor/Co-Author of books on other topics and genres ==
- Kontrasty. [Contrasts. Collection of Poetry and Prose by Young Ukrainians in the Western World.) NY, Princeton: Plast, 1970.
- Svity Shevchenka [The Worlds of Taras Shevchenko]. Editor et al. v. 1. New York: Shevchenko Scientific Society & Suchasnist', 1991.
- “Ukrainian Poetry” section, Ed. and Intro. in Shifting Borders: East European Poetries of the Eighties. Ed. Walter Cummins. Rutherford: Fairleigh Dickinson U. Press, 1993.
- Borys Antonenko-Davydovych: Lytsar Neabsurdnykh Idei. [Borys Antonenko-Davydovych: Knight of Non-Absurdist Ideas]. Ed. and Intro. Kyiv: Chas, 1994.
- Pro ukraїns'kyi pravopys i problemy movy [On The Ukrainian Orthography and Related Issues]. Editor et al., 1997.
- Svity Shevchenka [The Worlds of Taras Shevchenko]. Ed. et al. v.2. New York: Shevchenko Scientific Society, v. 2. NY: Shevchenko Sci. Soc., 2001.
- Volodymyr Vynnychenko: U poshukakh estetychnoï, osobystoï ta suspilnoï harmoniï [Volodymyr Vynnychenko: In Quest of the Esthetic, Individual and Social Harmony]. Ed. in chief et al. NY: UVAN, 2005.
- Contemporary Ukraine on The Cultural Map of Europe. Co-Editor (with Maria Rewakowicz) and Co-Author. Armonk: M.E. Sharpe, 2009. (ISBN 978-0-7656-2400-0, 2009).

== Chapters in/co-author of/ books ==
- "Filaret Kolessa's Reissued Works on Folklore." The Jubilee Collection of the Ukrainian Free Academy of Sciences. Winnipeg: UVAN, 1976.
- “Ukrainian Theater" in Ethnic Theater in America. Maxine Schwartz Seller, Ed. Westport: Greenwood Press, 1983.
- Antolohiia svitovoï literaturno-krytychnoï dumky XX st. [Anthology of World Literary and Critical Thought of the 20th Century]; also co-editor and co-translator of articles by Northrop Frye and Richard Rorty; author of article on existentialism. Maria Zubrytska, Ed. in Chief, Larissa Onyshkevych and John Fizer, Assoc. editors. Lviv: Litopys, 1996, 2003.
- "The Problem of the Definitive Literary Text and Political Censorship." Perspectives on Modern Central and East European Literature: Quests for Identity. Ed. Todd Patrick Armstrong. Houndmills, G. Britain & New York, NY: Palgrave, 2001, 25–37.
- "Characters Revealing Issues of Identity: In Terms of History, Nation, Religion, and Gender in Post-Soviet Ukrainian Drama." Society in Transition: Social Change in Ukraine in Western Perspectives. Ed. Wsevolod W. Isajiw. Toronto: Canadian Scholars' Press, 2003, 327–345.
- “Prava movy” ["Language Has Rights], Oberezhno - Mova! [This Is Language – Tread Lightly!] (Kyiv: Parliamentary Hearings). 2003, 38-39.
- "A Soviet Discourse on the Faustian Metaphor in Two Ukrainian Plays: by Oleksandr Levada and Yurii Shcherbak", in Twentieth Century Ukrainian Literature. Essays in Honor of Dmytro Shtohryn. Ed. by Jaroslav Rozumnyj, Kyiv: Mohyla Academy Publishing, 2011, 162–174.

== Introductory Essays to Books of Poetry, Drama, Language Studies ==
- "Ukrainian Family Names" [Introductory article], Dictionary of Ukrainian Surnames in Canada. Ed. F. Bogdan. Vancouver: Onomastic Society, 1974.
- “Muzyka Bat’kivshchyny Mene Bolyt’” [“The Music of My Country Pains Me”]. Intro. to Ihor Kalynets', Vohon Kupala [The Kupalo Fire]. Baltimore, 1975.
- Pershyi Vinok [The First Garland]. Eds. Natalia Kobryns'ka and Olena Pchilka. (1st ed. 1887). Editor and intro. to 2nd edition. New York: Ukrainian Women's League, 1984.
- “Vid Vertepu do Krylatoї Skrypky. Dramatychni tvory Wiry Wowk. Wira Wowk: Teatr. Kyiv: Rodovid, 2002, 5-19.
- Pro anima i animus, and Pro Esteru, prytchi i alehoriї Wiry Wowk. Intro. to : Wira Wowk, Dyptykh, Lviv: BaK, 2013, 3-6, and 61-62 resp.
- "Na Hrani dvokh riznykh svitiv" and "Heroi pid tyskom chasu i znannia maibutnioho', Intro. to Tadei Karabovych [Tadeusz Karabowicz], Dvi dramatychni poemy. Ostriv i Taina Vecheria. Lublin:Episteme, 2013. 7-11, 39-42.
- "Vichnist' nache khmarynka z doshchem", Introduction to Tadeucz Karabowicz, Vichnist' nache khmarynka z doshchem. Lublin: Episteme, 2015, 5-10.

== Translations ==
Translations of plays by Valerii Shevchuk;

- Birds from An Invisible Island (in An Anthology of Modern Ukrainian Drama, 2012).
- “Aqua Vitae/End of the Century”. MS.

Translations of short stories by

- Serhii Paradzhanov (AGNI, 28, 1989), 210-211.

Translations of poems by:

- Wira Wowk "Mandala" (345)
- Vasyl Stus "A Hundred Mirrors Glare at Me..." (417)
- Sofia Maidanska "You'll always be able to find me..." (543) and "Only once..." (547).

In: A Hundred Years of Youth, A Bilingual Anthology of 20th Century Ukrainian Poetry, Olha Luchuk and Michael M. Naydan, eds. and compilers. Lviv: Litopys, 2000.
