= Zenon Kuzelia =

Ukrainian historian, journalist, linguist

Zenon Frantsyskovych Kuzelia (23 June 1882 – 24 May 1952) was a prominent Ukrainian linguist, bibliographer, historian, journalist, and civil activist, as well as an ethnographer, lexicographer, and community figure.

He was born in a family of forestry in the village of Poruchyn (today's in Ternopil Raion). Kuzelia studied at Berezhany gymnasium, where he organized a secret club called "Young Ukraine". After finishing the gymnasium in 1900, he enrolled in the Lviv University. Kuzelia, however, soon moved to Vienna, where he continued to study at the University of Vienna and headed the Ukrainian student society "Sich". After graduating, he worked in Vienna, and in 1909 he moved to Chernivtsi, while also becoming a member of the Shevchenko Scientific Society in Lviv.

With the start of the World War I, Kuzelia moved back to Vienna, where he worked for a community. From 1916 to 1920 he conducted a culturally educational work for the interned in the camp near Salzwedel (Germany).

After moving to Berlin, Kuzelia was an editor of a journal called Ukrainske Slovo (Ukrainian Word) and publications such as Ukrainische Kulturberichte and Ukrains'ka Nakladnya. In 1943, a large Ukrainian–German dictionary was published, edited by Zenon Kuzelia and Jaroslav Rudnyckyj, which even to this day is an unsurpassed work.

From 1944 to 1952, Kuzelia worked in Munich as a head of the Ukrainian Student Assistance Commission, which helped the Ukrainian students abroad. Along with it, he continued to work in mentioned publications and was a coauthor of the first part of Encyclopedia of Ukraine (Munich and New York, 1949). In 1949 Kuzelia was appointed the head of the Shevchenko Scientific Society.

Kuzelia lived in Paris from 1951 until his death in 1952.

== Bibliography ==
- Pohrebennyk, F. "Kuzelya Zenon Frantsyskovcyh" (Encyclopedia. Ukrainian Language.) "Ukrainian Encyclopedia". Kiev, 2000. ISBN 966-7492-07-9
- Volynets, N. "Name which will say a lot". "Zhaivir". 1992
- Demsky, M. "Another one from undeservedly forgotten ones". "Ukrainske slovo". 1994.
