= Volodymyr Levytsky =

Ukrainian mathematician (1872-1956)

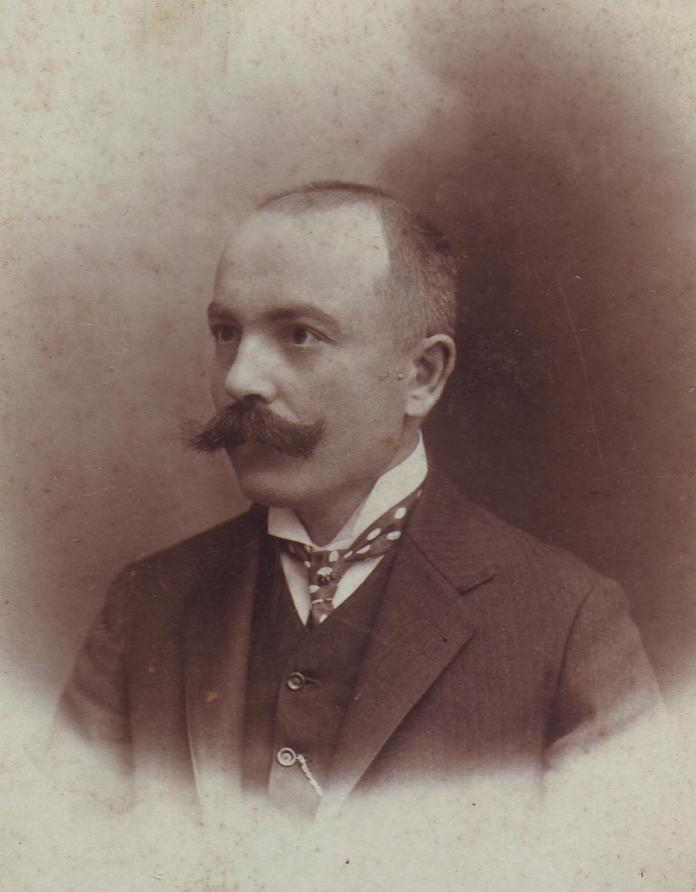
- Born: December 31, 1872; Ternopil, Galicia
- Died: August 13, 1956 (aged 83); Lviv, Ukraine
- Citizenship: Ukrainian
- Known for: Functions of a complex variable
- Scientific career
- Fields: Mathematician

Volodymyr Levytsky (31 December 1872 – 13 August 1956) was a Ukrainian mathematician who taught mathematics and studied functions of a complex variable.

== Biography and education ==
Volodymyr Levytsky finished his doctorate at the University of Lviv in 1901 and went on to teach mathematics and physics at high schools. After the First World War Ukrainian students were not allowed to enrol at the university and in 1920 Ukrainian professors were also banned, leaving only Polish lecturers. As a result, the Ukrainian students set up an underground university at the university in July 1921. From the beginning Levytsky taught mathematics at this new underground university for a few years until it was forced to close in 1925. Levytsky was the head of the mathematics-physics section of the Shevchenko Scientific Society in Lviv and was the president of the society from 1931 to 1935 as well as its editor of the journal. Just before the outbreak of the war until his death in 1956, Levytsky taught at the Lviv Pedagogical Institute.

== Works ==
Levytsky concentrated on functions of a complex variable and the application of mathematics to theoretical physics. The first mathematical paper in Ukrainian was written by Levytsky as well as being an editor of the first Ukrainian mathematical journal. He brought mathematics and physical and chemical terms to the Ukrainian language through his efforts at the Shevchenko Scientific Society in Lviv. During his short time at the Lviv (Underground) Ukrainian University he produced important papers on the history of mathematics.
