= Red Data Book of Ukraine =

Threatened animal list

The Red Data Book of Ukraine, or literally the Red Book of Ukraine (Ukrainian: Червона книга України, romanized: Chervona knyha Ukrainy, IPA: [tʃerˈwɔnɐ ˈknɪɦɐ ʊkrɐˈjinɪ]), is an official national red list of the threatened animals, plants and fungi that are protected by the law in Ukraine. State administration, conservation regulation and control of species is provided by the state institutions such as the Cabinet of Ukraine, Ministry of Ecology (Ministry of Environmental Protection and Natural Resources), and other state institutions.

Scientific support for the Red Data Book is provided by the National Commission on the Red Data Book issues that prepare propositions about including and excluding species from the Red Data Book, provides control over materials' preparation, determination of edition structure and coordination of related activities. The National Commission on the Red Data Book issues is formed by the National Academy of Sciences of Ukraine based on its Schmalhausen Institute of Zoology and Cholodny Institute of Botany that directly conduct registry of the red data.

Three editions of the Red Book of Ukraine were published (1980, 1994–1996, 2009). As of April 9, 2021, 1,544 species have been listed in the Red Book of Ukraine, of which 687 are animals and 857 are plants.

== History ==
According to the legislation of Ukraine, a new edition of the Red Book must be created every 10 years.

The first edition of the Ukrainian Red Book was published in 1980 by the Naukova Dumka publishing house of the National Academy of Sciences of Ukraine. It was published by the National Academy of Sciences of Ukraine publishing house Naukova Dumka.

In 1994 and 1996, there was released the second edition of the Book by the Ukrainian Encyclopedia.

In 2009, the Third Edition of the Red Book of Ukraine was released by Global Consulting Ukraine.

The fourth edition of the Red Book was supposed to be released in 2019, but it was not published. However, on March 3, 2021, the Ministry of Environmental Protection and Natural Resources of Ukraine published the approved Order with an updated list of animal species included in the Red Book of Ukraine. In 2021, 1,544 species were listed in the Red Book of Ukraine, of which 687 were animals and 857 were plants, with 52 species being listed in the Red Book of Ukraine for the first time, and 21 being excluded from it. Among the species listed in the Red Book of Ukraine, the most public discussion was caused by the question of the steppe marmot, whose inclusion in the Red Book was actively opposed by hunting communities. Several species of fish that are objects of fishing were also listed in the Red Book of Ukraine in 2021, including the common nase, vimba vimba, ide, and European eel.

Among the most notable changes to the lists of species in the Red Book of Ukraine in 2021 is also a threefold increase in the number of terrestrial mollusk species listed in it.

== Protection categories ==
According to the Law of Ukraine on the Red Book of Ukraine, species listed in the Red Book are divided into the following categories:

=== First edition ===
In the first edition of the Red Book of Ukraine, there were no official categories. There were sections "status", where the state of the species was characterized, for example, as "rare species", "rare endangered species", "rare valuable ornamental plant", etc.

=== Second edition ===
The second edition had the following categories: extinct (0), endangered (I), vulnerable (II), rare (III), uncertain (IV), insufficiently known (V), recovered (VI).

- Extinct: species for which, after repeated searches in typical localities or in other known and possible places of distribution, there is no information about their existence in the wild;
- Endangered: species that are threatened with extinction and are unlikely to survive if the adverse effects of the factors affecting their status continue;
- Vulnerable: species that may become endangered in the near future if the effects of the factors affecting their status continue;
- Rare: species with small populations that are not currently classified as endangered or vulnerable, although they are threatened;
- Uncertain: species that are known not to be endangered, vulnerable or rare, but there is no reliable information to determine which of these categories they belong to;
- Poorly known: species that could be classified as one of the above categories but, due to a lack of complete reliable information, the issue remains uncertain;
- Recovered: species whose populations, thanks to the measures taken to protect them, do not cause concern, but are not subject to use and require constant monitoring.

=== Third edition ===
- Extinct: species for which, after repeated searches conducted in typical localities or in other known and possible places of distribution, there is no information about their presence in nature or in specially created conditions;
- Extinct in nature: species that have disappeared in nature, but have survived in specially created conditions;
- Endangered: species that are under threat of extinction in natural conditions and whose preservation is unlikely if the effects of factors that negatively affect the state of their populations continue;
- Vulnerable: species that may be classified as endangered in the near future if the effects of factors that negatively affect the state of their populations continue;
- Rare: species whose populations are small and currently do not belong to the category of endangered or vulnerable, although they are threatened with danger;
- Unestimated: species that are known to belong to the category of endangered, vulnerable or rare, but have not yet been attributed to it;
- Insufficiently known: species that cannot be attributed to any of the specified categories due to the lack of the necessary complete and reliable information.

=== Number of species in different editions ===
Groups / Edition	First edition (1980)	Second edition (1994, 1996)	Third edition (2009)	Fourth edition (2021)
Animal world
Cnidaria	0	2	2	2
Nematode	0	2	2	0
Polychaete	0	0	0	1
Oligochaeta	0	1	1	1
Leech	0	6	8	10
Gastropoda	0	3	3	5
Terrestrial mollusc	0	8	14	42
Bivalvia	0	1	3	7
Branchiopoda	0	8	8	10
Copepod	0	1	5	10
Malacostraca	0	17	18	15
Arachnid	0	2	2	2
Myriapoda	0	3	3	3
Springtail	0	0	2	6
Insect	18	173	226	312
Petromyzontidae	0	2	2	2
Actinopterygii	0	32	69	75
Amphibian	4	5	8	9
Reptile	6	8	11	11
Bird	28	67	87	91
Mammal	29	41	68	73
Animal world in general	85	382	542	687
Plant world
Vascular plant	151	439	611	625
Bryophyte	0	28	46	47
Algae	0	17	60	61
Lichen	0	27	52	56
Fungus	0	30	57	68
Plant world in general	151	541	826	857
Total	236	923	1368	1544

== See also ==
- Emerald Network of Ukraine
- Ukrainian Encyclopedia (publishing)
- Red Data List
