= NASU Institute of Encyclopaedic Research =

Ukrainian research organization

The Institute of Encyclopaedic Research of the National Academy of Sciences of Ukraine is a Ukrainian state-supported academic research and publishing organization based in Kyiv (Tereshchenkivs'ka St, 3, Shevchenkivs'kyi, Kyiv), Ukraine. 50°26′39.54″N 30°30′56.91″E

Its main lines of research activities are:

- Fundamental, pilot and applied encyclopedia studies;
- Elaboration of scholarly and methodological principles for producing various types of encyclopedias;
- Studying, analyzing and generalizing international and national experience in encyclopedic knowledge, in particular, in preparation and printing of encyclopedias;

== History and structure ==
The Institute of Encyclopaedic Research was established by and is under the authority of the National Academy of Sciences of Ukraine (NAS). It was established on April 14, 2004 as a result of reorganization through merging of The Encyclopaedia of Modern Ukraine Coordinating Bureau and The Ukrainian International Committee on Science and Culture under the National Academy of Sciences of Ukraine.

The Institute is part of History, Philosophy and Law Department in NAS. The Institute is a state-supported academic organization that acts as a legal entity. Its key task is to carry out fundamental, pilot and applied studies in encyclopedic areas to obtain new scientific information, facilitate scientific and technical progress, social, economic and cultural growth of the society and promote strengthening of Ukrainian statehood.

The Institute's staff includes such scientists as I. Dziuba, Y. Yatskiv, S. Kulchytskyi, M. Strikha and O. Kupchynskyi. The chief executive officer is Mykola Zhelezniak (since 2008). The previous CEO was Yaroslav Yatskiv (2004–2008).

== Activities ==
The Institute is an editorship and editorial staff of the Encyclopaedia of Modern Ukraine, as well as a coordination center of the encyclopedic activity in Ukraine. Thus, in addition to work on the Encyclopaedia of Modern Ukraine, a significant set of the mission of the Institute is the implementation of fundamental and applied research in the field of encyclopedic activity (encyclopedia science and encyclopedia publishing), in particular the history and methodology of the encyclopedic activity, theoretical and applied issues in encyclopedia science.

Publications (books), methodical manuals are published according to the results of scientific research. In addition to the Encyclopaedia of Modern Ukraine, some reference books and online sources are also published, for example Famous figures by Ukrainian origin in world civilization, The World Atlas of National Online Encyclopedias, Corpus of Ukrainian Encyclopedias. Since 2009, the Institute publishes the Encyclopedia Herald of Ukraine (periodical).

Methodological principles and recommendations of the Institute concerning encyclopedia making have been used by other institutions that deal with the preparation of encyclopedic and biographic works, such as 3-volume "Ternopil Encyclopaedic Dictionary". Ternopil, 2004. To illustrate «Anthologie. De La Littérature ukrainienne du XIe au XXe Siécle ». Paris - Kyiv. 2004, the Institute's iconographic base has been used.
