= Klympush =

Klympush or Klimpush (Ukrainian or Russian: Климпуш) is a gender-neutral Ukrainian surname that may refer to

- Ivanna Klympush-Tsintsadze (born 1972), Ukrainian politician and journalist
- Orest Klympush (born 1941), Ukrainian engineer, politician and diplomat, father of Ivanna
