= Encyclopedia of Ukraine =

National encyclopedia

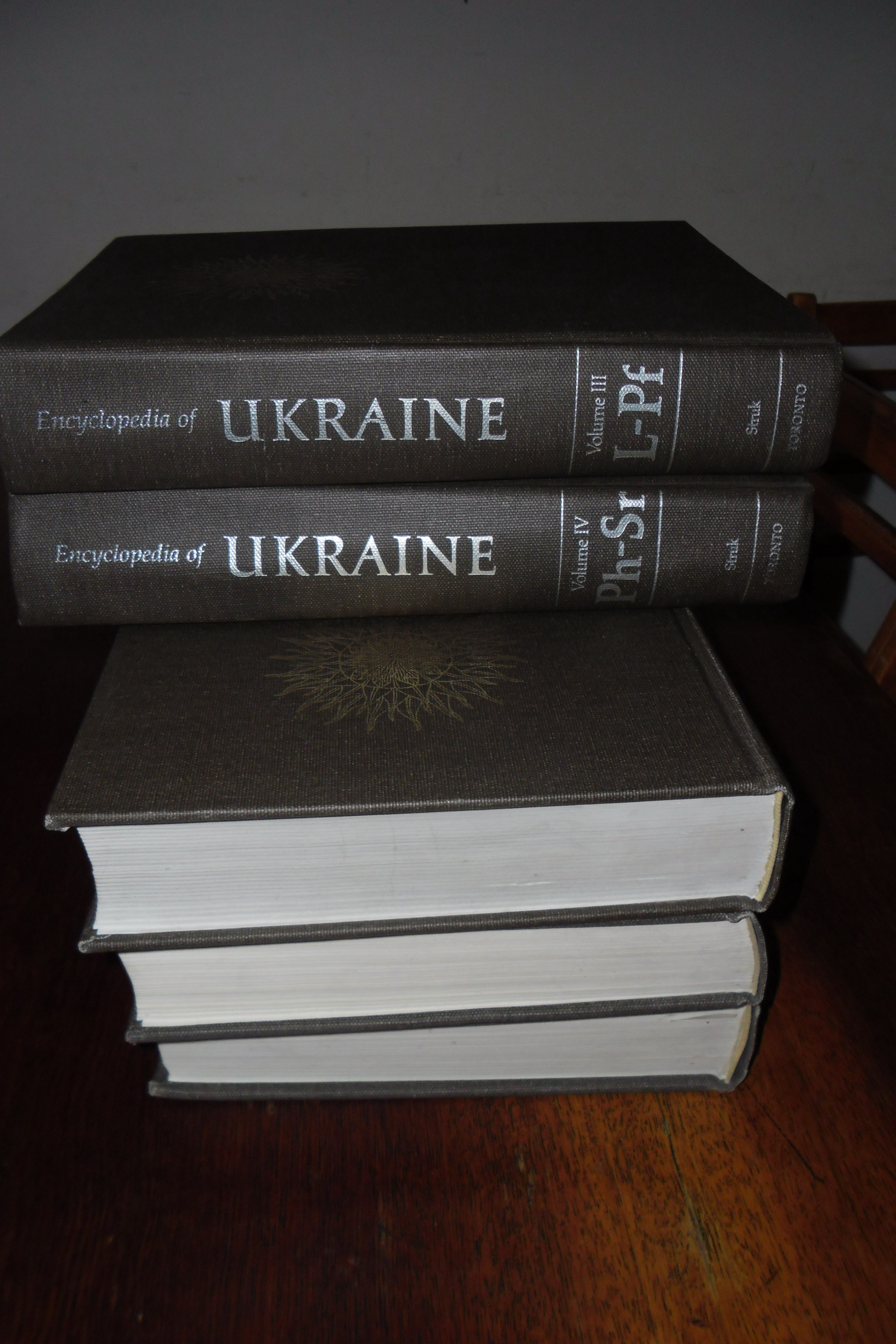
English-language publishing

The Encyclopedia of Ukraine (Ukrainian: Енциклопедія українознавства, romanized: Entsyklopediia ukrainoznavstva), published from 1984 to 2001, is a fundamental work of Ukrainian studies.

== Development ==
The work was created under the auspices of the Shevchenko Scientific Society in Europe (Sarcelles, near Paris). As the Encyclopedia of Ukrainian Studies it conditionally consists of two parts, the first being a general part that consists of a three volume reference work divided in to subjects or themes. The second part is a 10 volume encyclopedia with entries arranged alphabetically.

The editor-in-chief of Volumes I and II (published in 1984 and 1988 respectively) was Volodymyr Kubijovyč. The concluding three volumes, with Danylo Husar Struk as editor-in-chief, appeared in 1993. The encyclopedia set came with a 30-page Map & Gazetteer of Ukraine compiled by Kubijovyč and Arkadii Zhukovsky. It contained a detailed fold-out map (scale 1:2,000,000).

A final volume, Encyclopedia of Ukraine: Index and Errata, containing only the index and a list of errata to volumes 1–5, was published by the Canadian Institute of Ukrainian Studies in 2001. It was compiled by Andrij Makuch and Irene Popowycz.

The 1955 dictionary part was reprinted in Ukraine (1993–2003).

== English translations ==
A two-volume version of the general part of the encyclopedia was published as Ukraine: A Concise Encyclopedia in 1963 and 1970.

Subsequently, a larger project based on the dictionary part was launched as the Encyclopedia of Ukraine. In 1984–1993 the Canadian Institute of Ukrainian Studies at the University of Alberta Faculty of Arts, with the help of the Canadian Foundation of Ukrainian Studies and the Shevchenko Scientific Society in Europe, prepared an English-language version of the encyclopedia, published by the University of Toronto Press. It consists of five volumes, almost 4,000 pages and some 12,500 alphabetical entries. It was described in the Canadian Journal of History as "the most comprehensive and balanced work in the English language on Ukraine and Ukrainians in the diaspora" and a "monumental publication".

== Reprint in Ukraine ==
Shortly after Ukraine became independent in 1991, the newly revived Shevchenko Scientific Society in Lviv, under the direction of Oleh Romaniv, reprinted the dictionary part of Kubijovyč's Ukrainian-language Encyclopedia of Ukraine for the first time in Ukraine, in eleven volumes released from 1993 to 2003.

In an essay in volume one, Romaniv wrote that the Encyclopedia of Ukraine demonstrates an exemplar of Ukrainian bias and preconception in relation to Russia, which was very typical for the works of the Ukrainian diaspora during the period when Ukraine was part of the USSR.

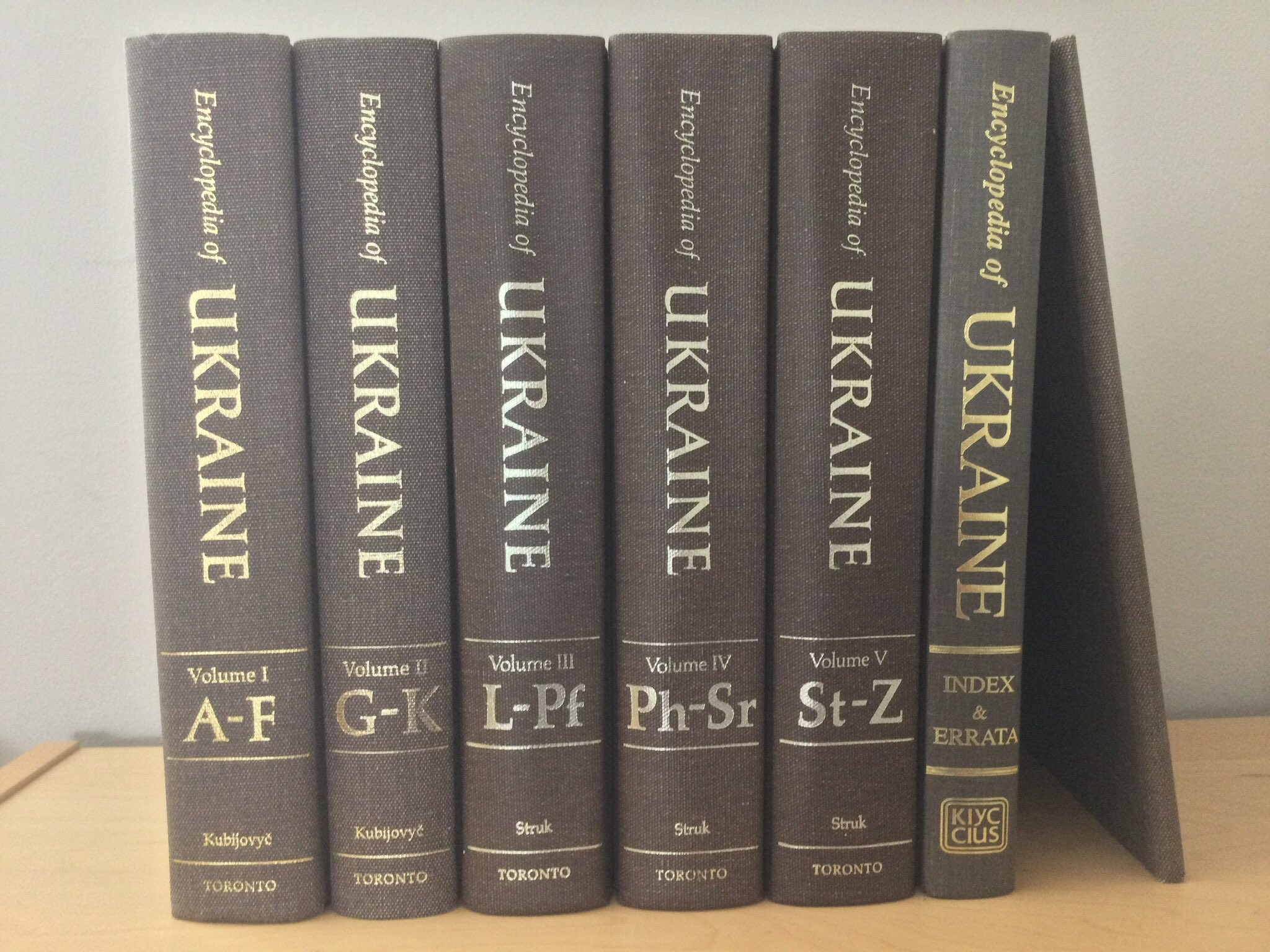
Encyclopedia of Ukraine: Index and Errata

== Internet Encyclopedia of Ukraine ==
The Internet Encyclopedia of Ukraine is a free English-language online encyclopedia with a wide range of articles about Ukraine, including its history, people, geography, economy and culture. Upon completion, the IEU will be the most authoritative and comprehensive Internet-based resource in English on Ukraine and Ukrainians. As of May 2025 it contained some 11,000 entries and 8,000 illustrations.

As of 2022, the encyclopedia team consisted of Marko R. Stech (editor-in-chief), Serhiy Bilenky (consulting scholarly editor), Tania Plawuszczak-Stech (senior scholarly editor), Larysa Bilous, and a team of subject editors. The website was designed by Jaroslaw Kiebalo; Walter Kiebalo acted as consulting designer.

== Reception ==
The Encyclopedia received generally positive reviews from Western academic reviewers. Myroslav Shkandrij reviewed the Encyclopedia for the Journal of Ukrainian Studies in 1993, observing that the project "appears to have won the admiration, indeed the enthusiastic endorsement, of almost all reviewers".

=== Criticism ===
The encyclopedia has been criticised for its portrayal of antisemitism, symptomatic of a broader historical bias in Ukrainian studies. Kubijovyč's original print editions lacked an entry on the Holocaust and, in the 1984 entry on antisemitism, it stated "there has never ... been a Ukrainian anti-Semitic organization or political party". An entry on the Holocaust was contributed by Dieter Pohl in 2007.

== See also ==
- Encyclopedia of Modern Ukraine
- Ukrainian Soviet Encyclopedia
