= Volodymyr Kubijovyč =

Ukrainian historian (1900–1985)

- Володимир Кубійович
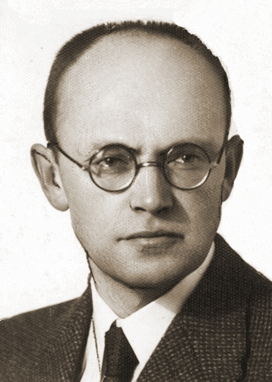

Deputy of the President of the Ukrainian National Committee
- In office 17 March 1945 – 1945
- Preceded by: Position established
- Succeeded by: Position abolished

Chairman of the Ukrainian Central Committee
- In office 1939–1945
- Preceded by: Position established
- Succeeded by: Position abolished

Personal details
- Born: 23 September 1900 Nowy Sącz, Kingdom of Galicia and Lodomeria, Austria–Hungary
- Died: 2 November 1985 (aged 85) Paris, France
- Education: Jagiellonian University

Volodymyr Mychajlovyč Kubijovyč (Note: also spelled Kubiiovych or Kubiyovych; Ukrainian: Володимир Михайлович Кубійович, romanized: Volodymyr Mykhailovych Kubiiovych; Russian: Владимир Михайлович Кубийович, romanized: Vladimir Mikhailovich Kubiyovich; Polish: Włodzimierz Kubijowicz) (23 September 1900 – 2 November 1985) was a well-known anthropological geographer in prewar Polish-ruled Western Ukraine, a leading wartime Ukrainian nationalist politician who collaborated with German authorities, and an important post-war émigré intellectual of mixed Ukrainian-Polish background.

Kubijovyč, like many other Ukrainians, had experienced ethnic discrimination in the Second Polish Republic, a background that influenced his perception of Germany as a counterpart in matters of Ukrainian political aspirations. During the World War II, he became head of the Ukrainian Central Committee (UCC) in Kraków, a nonpolitical, but influential social welfare and relief agency, which set up a network of Ukrainian cooperatives, schools, and youth organizations in the General Government. Overall, Kubijovyč tried to safeguard Ukrainian interests there.

He advocated the creation of an autonomous, ethnically homogeneous Ukrainian enclave within the General Government, free from Jews and Poles, and the transfer of Jewish property confiscated by the German authorities to Ukrainian control. In light of this, and given that the UCC's press, subject to heavy German censorship, carried anti-Jewish content, some historians have described Kubijovyč as an antisemite. In 1943, he was involved in the formation of the 14th Waffen Grenadier Division of the SS. On the other hand, in 1944 a politician appealed for an end to the hostilities between Poles and Ukrainians in Volyn and Eastern Galicia.

Kubijovyč was loyal to the OUN-M, Andriy Melnyk's faction in the Organization of Ukrainian Nationalists. After the war, Volodymyr settled in France, where he primarily devoted himself to scholarly work. He later became the chief editor of the Encyclopedia of Ukraine and the General Secretary of the Shevchenko Scientific Society. Kubijovyč also supported other projects of the Ukrainian diaspora. He died in Paris on 2 November 1985.

== Early life ==
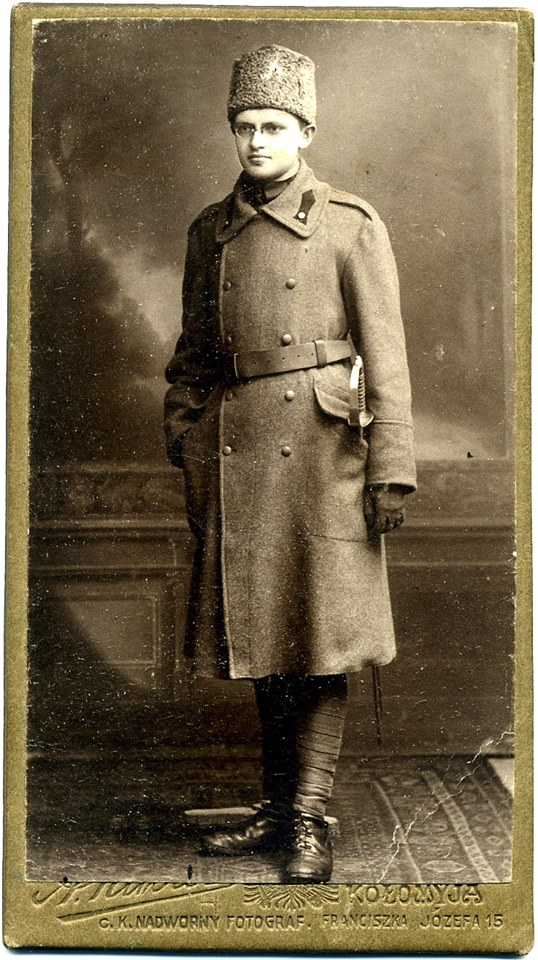
Volodymyr Kubijovyč in the uniform of an artillery officer of the Ukrainian Galician Army, 1918

Kubijovyč was born in 1900 in Nowy Sącz, part of the historical region of Lemkivshchyna; his father Mykhailo was a Greek-Catholic of Ukrainian descent, while his mother was Maria Dobrowolska, a Catholic of Polish extraction. He was baptized into the Ukrainian Greek Catholic Church and, as he stated, became automatically Ruthenian but grew up in mix Polish-Ukrainian surroundings and spoke both Ukrainian and Polish. At age 13, he read Mykhailo Hrushevsky's multi-volume History of Ukraine-Rusʹ. Between the ages of 15 and 18, Kubijovyč studied cartography, he also read books by Henryk Sienkiewicz in Polish and other works in German. In 1918, Kubijovyč enrolled on a doctoral programme at the Jagiellonian University in Kraków, but World War I and his enlistment into the Ukrainian Galician Army interrupted his education. He returned home on sick leave with Typhus before the end of the Polish-Ukrainian war and, in 1919, resumed his studies at the Jagiellonian University in Kraków. In 1923, Kubijovyč concluded his doctorate about the anthropological geography of the Gorgany range of the eastern Carpathian Mountains. In 1928 successfully defended his habilitation on population displacement of peoples in the European part of the Soviet Union. In 1932, he became a member of the Shevchenko Scientific Society in Lwów (today Lviv). During the years 1928 to 1939, Kubijovyč taught at Jagiellonian University as an associated professor, collaborated with various academic institution, and was a teacher in Kraków high schools. In recognition of his work, Kubijovyč obtained a financial scholarship from the Polish Ministry of Religious Affairs and Public Education for his journey to Czechoslovakia and Romania. He also received time off from his university duties.

His scientific work included describing the boundaries of the Ukrainian ethnographic territory. Since they were larger than official statistics indicated, including lands west of the Zbruch River, among others, this drew criticism from various circles and state institutions. In 1939, was suspended him from lecture duties at the Jagiellonian University indefinitely, and lost his job as a teacher.

He was an editor and co-author of the pioneering Ukrainian-language Atlas of Ukraine and Adjacent Lands (1937) and the equally pioneering Ukrainian-language Geography of Ukraine and Neighbouring Lands (1938, 1943).

== Second World War ==
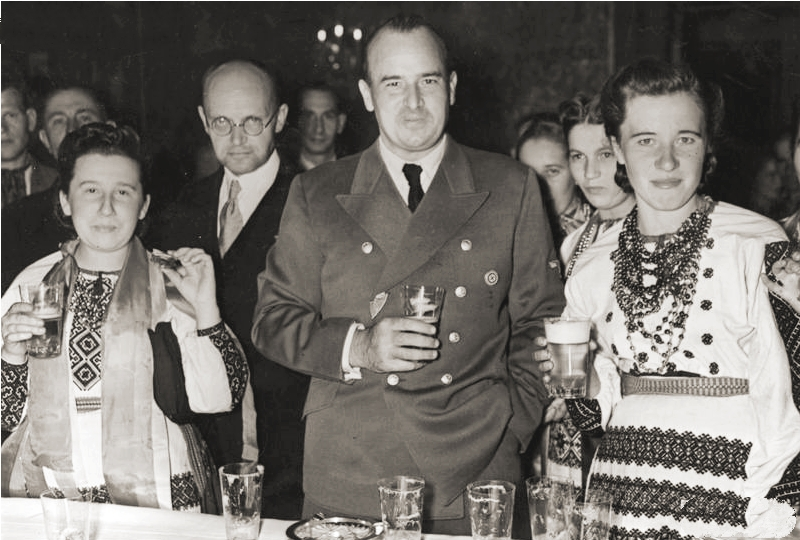
Kubijovyč and Hans Frank with the Ukrainian harvest festival delegation. Wawel, German Occupied Poland, 1943.

Kubijovyč was a supporter of the OUN-M (Andriy Melnyk's faction in the Organization of Ukrainian Nationalists). He was one of the major Ukrainian collaborators with Nazi Germany. In April 1941, Kubijovyč asked Hans Frank to create under the auspices of Nazi Germany an ethnically filtered Ukrainian area within the General Government or an autonomous state, where Poles and Jews would not be allowed to live.

In the spring of 1940, acting with the permission of Hans Frank, a number of Ukrainian self-help committees staffed by the OUN established in Kraków a coordinating structure called the Ukrainian Central Committee (UCC). Volodymyr Kubijovyč was elected as its head. The UCC was the only officially authorized Ukrainian social welfare organization in the Nazi-occupied Polish territories, with a mandate to care for the elderly, sick and homeless, and to look after the welfare of the Ukrainian workers sent to Germany from the General Government. As part of its activities, it published antisemitic materials in the collaborationist press In 1940, he was appointed professor of the Ukrainian Free University in Prague.

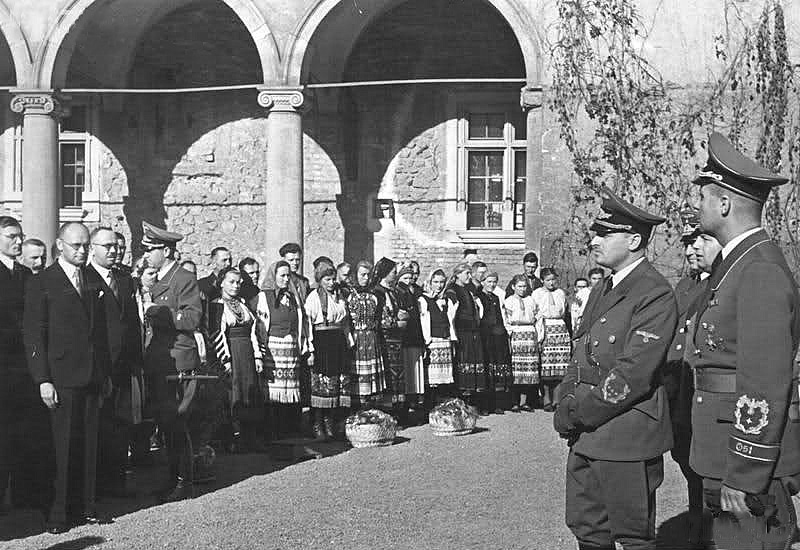
Harvest Festival at Wawel, German occupied Poland, October 1943.

On August 16, 1942, a message from the Ukrainian Central Committee (UCC) was published in the Lviv News newspaper stating, "Anyone who hides Jews or hinders their resettlement will be punished." Resettlement in August 1942 meant the deportation of 40,000 members of Lviv's Jewish population to Belzec extermination camp.

In 1943, Volodymyr Kubijovyč worked closely with a high-ranking member of the SS, Otto Wächter, in organizing the Waffen-SS Galizien. On 2 May 1943, he publicly announced his willingness to take up arms and declared himself ready to join the newly formed Ukrainian Waffen-SS.

Throughout the war, Kubijovyč used his German contacts to shield the western Ukrainian population from Nazi policies. In 1943, as Ukrainian peasants in the Zamość region were accused of resistance, Volodymyr Kubijovyč successfully intervened with Hans Frank to prevent reprisals. At other times, he was reduced to writing in protest to the German authorities against the impact of their rule of terror on the Ukrainian civilian population, which included unprovoked public abuse, arbitrary killings and mass shootings. Some of this material was later brought up as evidence at the Nuremberg Trials. In 1943 he communicated to Frank that "the Ukrainians would work for the [Reich's] final victory" and expressed appreciation for "the liberation from the Polish yoke due to the will of the Fuhrer and the glorious victory of the Wehrmacht".

Kubijovyč also supported recruitment for forced labour in Galicia. According to him, it was carried out with order and adherence to deportation orders by Ukrainians in some areas but in other areas "the process equaled a “massive manhunt,” in which people were picked up off the street, out of their homes, during school, at the market, and in movie theaters without notice and shipped to Germany."

According to some Ukrainian sources, Kubijovyč tried to use his official position to ameliorate Ukrainian-Polish wartime tensions in Galicia by calling for an end to the armed underground conflict between the two sides in 1944. These sources also credit him with saving some three hundred people, most of them Jews, from arrest by the Nazi authorities. But in his correspondence with Nazi officials "he glorified Hitler, shared anti-Semitic tropes, and advocated the cleansing of Jews and Poles from the majority Ukrainian areas of the General Governorate for the Occupied Polish Region".

In a letter dated February 1943 and addressed to Hans Frank, Kubijovych wrote, "Arrests and shootings of persons unfit for work in the District of Sanok. During the period from 18 to 24 January 1943 about 300 persons were arrested in the neighborhood of Sanok in accordance with lists compiled some time before by the local mayors on orders of the authorities. Some of them were soon set free, but the fate of the rest is unknown to us and their families. The shootings which are daily taking place on the Jewish cemetery promise no good". The Jewish population of Sanok, including the Jewish ghetto, had been eradicated by December 1942. By February 1943, the Jews from Sanok had been deported to Belzec extermination camp. In addition, Ukrainian auxiliaries had helped the Nazis with deportations and murders of Jews in Sanok. A few sentences later Kubijovyč writes, "The current view is that now the shootings of the Jews [have] come to an end those of the Ukrainians begin".

After assassination of Otto Bauer, the Nazi vice-governor of the District of Galicia, Volodymyr Kubijovyč made a speech at the funeral on February 15, 1944 glorifying Hitler and the German army.

As the Red Army approached in 1944, Kubijovyč and his Ukrainian Central Committee fled German-occupied Poland to Germany.

== Emigration ==
At the time of Nazi Germany's capitulation Kubijovyč was in the American occupation zone, from where he moved to France. In Germany, he reorganized the Shevchenko Scientific Society as an émigré institution. He acted as its secretary general from 1947 to 1963, and, from 1952, president of its European branch.

In exile, Kubijovyč became the chief editor of the Ukrainian-language Encyclopedia of Ukrainian Studies (Entsyklopediia ukrainoznavstva, 10 vols., 1949–84), the largest scholarly project undertaken by Ukrainian émigrés during the Cold War. Reflecting Kubijovyč's own strong Ukrainophile views, it was intended to preserve the Ukrainian national heritage, which he saw as being neglected and downgraded under the Soviet rule. The English translation of its thematic section, Ukraine: A Concise Encyclopædia, was published in two volumes in 1963–71. A revised and expanded English-language edition of the ten-volume alphabetic part appeared under the title Encyclopedia of Ukraine in Canada in the 1980s and 1990s, only after Kubijovyč's death, and is presently being put on-line.

During his exile in France Kubijovyč enjoyed considerable prestige as the most prominent Ukrainian scholar in the West. He drew the respect of the Polish intellectual Jerzy Giedroyć, another resident of Paris, who noted in his autobiography that Kubijovyč had behaved honourably during the war ("Zachował się świetnie"). In 1991, after Ukraine declared independence from the Soviet Union, scholars in Ukraine began reprinting Kubijovyč's major works, especially his encyclopedias, making them available to a wider readership in the home country for the first time.

Together with Atanas Figol, between 6 March and 8 April 1974 Kubijovych performed an air trip around the world, visiting the United States (including Hawaii), Australia, Singapore, Tehran and Beirut before returning to his residence in Sarcelles. On his way, Kubijovych met representatives of Ukrainian communities inthe USA and in Australia. The journey was dedicated to the 25th anniversary of the Encyclopedia of Ukrainian Studies, and in its process over 100,000 $ could be collected for its publication. Shortly before his death in 1985, Kubijovych planned to perform another such trip, but the worsening state of his health prevented it from taking place.

In his later years, Kubijovyč published three volumes of memoirs describing his experiences in interwar Poland and during the Second World War, and his émigré scholarly life in Germany and France during the Cold War. The most wide-ranging of these was the Ukrainian-language volume titled I Am 85 Years Old (Paris and Munich, 1985).

Volodymyr Kubijovyč died on 2 November 1985 in Paris.

== Modern legacy ==
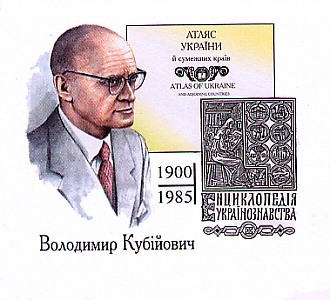
Volodymyr Kubijovyč on a Ukrainian postal stationery item

A memorial plaque to Kubijovych in Lviv

After the collapse of the Soviet Union, the hostile Soviet propaganda line on Kubijovyč lost its official status and was replaced by a nationalist line. His works, including his encyclopedias, were published in Ukraine where they are now in wide circulation. Kubijovyč's print edition has been criticized for not having an entry on The Holocaust and stating within the entry on "antisemitism" that no Ukrainian "anti-Semitic organization or political party" has ever existed (the expanded Internet edition has a 2007 article on the "Holocaust" by Dieter Pohl, but the 1984 entry on "Anti-Semitism" by Bohdan Wytwycky with the latter statement remains). It also includes pseudoscience in relation to race, referencing theories by one of the foremost racial theorists in Nazi Germany Ludwig Ferdinand Clauß in an attempt to analyze the psychology of the Ukrainian population.

In 1975, Kubijovych published an account of history titled "The Ukrainians in the Generalgouvernment – 1939–1941". The National Archives of Canada has a Volodymyr Kubijovyč collection. It consists of 28 volumes, with each volume being 20 cm of files, that were donated between 1987 and 1993. None of the documents appear to have been digitized.

In 2000 a pre-stamped envelope was issued by the Ukrainian postal service honouring the hundredth anniversary of Kubijovyč's birthday. In the 2020s, Director of the Ukrainian Jewish Committee, Eduard Dolinsky, has been a vocal opponent on the veneration of Kubijovyč, stating that Kubijovyč should be remembered as a direct accomplice in the murder of Ukrainian Jews and the plunder of their property.

The University of Alberta's Canadian Institute for Ukrainian Studies has an endowment of $437,757 CAD, that is used to support the institute's encyclopedia projects. The endowment was established in November, 1986 with support from the Government of Alberta.

In April 2023, a majority of people who partook in a vote regarding the renaming of Przhevalsky Street in Kyiv voted to rename the street after Volodymyr Kubijovyč. An online petition was launched through Kyiv City Council to prevent the renaming, which received 696 signatures, after a motion for the renaming was adopted by the city council. However, following a complaint from Israeli ambassador to Ukraine Michael Brodsky, the mayor of Kyiv, Vitalii Klychko, personally intervened and prevented the street from being renamed. In July 2023, a Ukrainian village was deciding between Levko Matsievich Street and Volodymyr Kubijovyč Street for the renaming of Chelyuskin Street. There is currently a street honouring him in Ivano-Frankivsk Oblast. Since 1992, there has been a street named after him in Lviv.

== Bibliography ==
- Markiewicz, Paweł (2018). The Ukrainian Central Committee, 1940-1945: A Case of Collaboration in Nazi-Occupied Poland (PDF). Kraków: Jagiellonian University.
