= Shevchenko Scientific Society =

Academic society

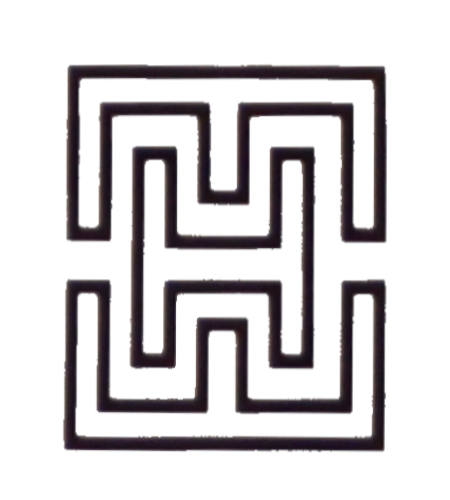
- Emblem used by the US and Canadian branches of the society
- Formation: 1873
- Headquarters: Lviv, Ukraine
- Chairman: Roman Kushnir
- Website: Official website

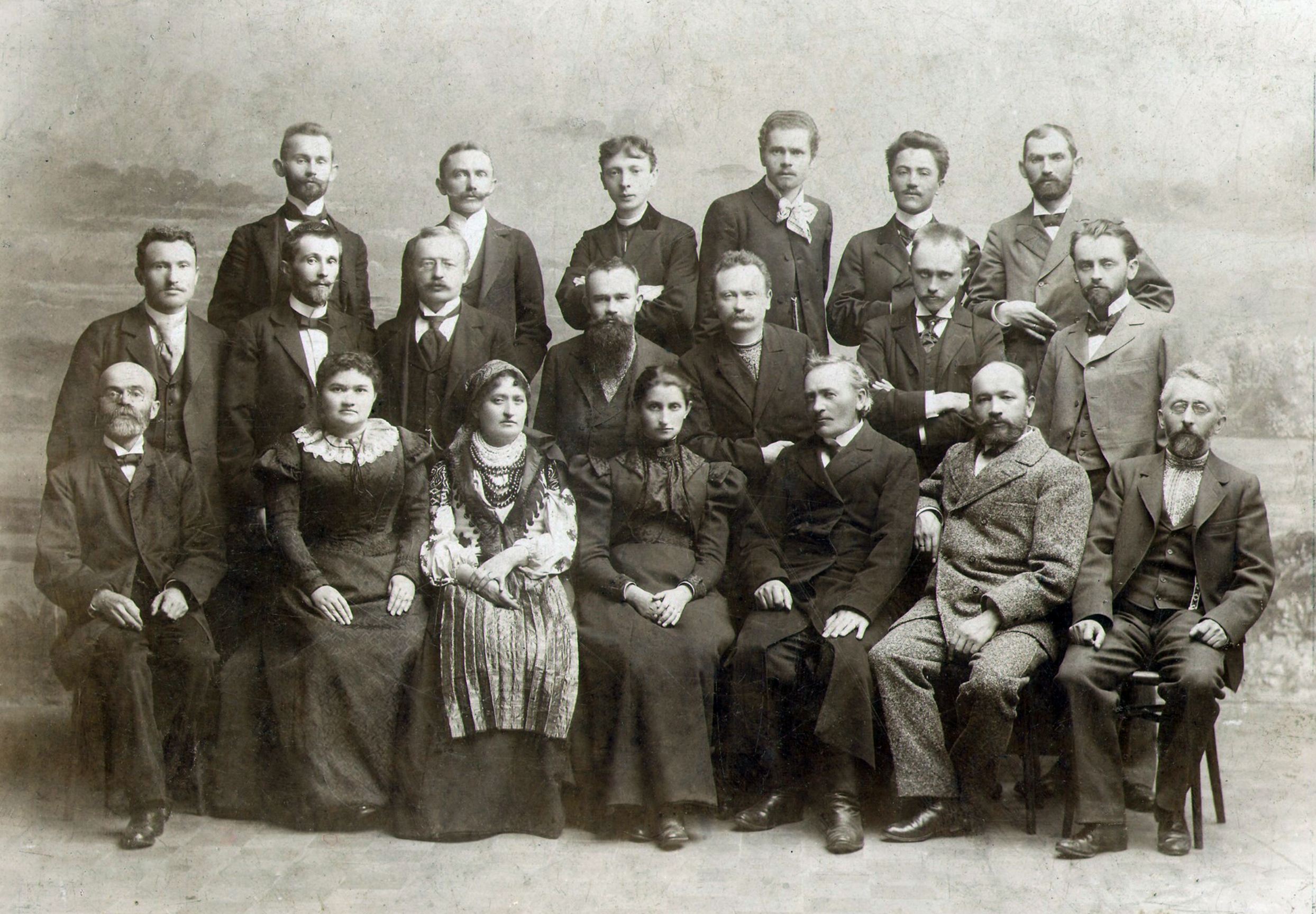
The board and members of the Shevchenko Scientific Society celebrating the 100th anniversary of the publication of Ivan Kotliarevsky's Eneida, Lviv, 31 October 1898: Sitting in the first row: Mykhaylo Pavlyk, Yevheniya Yaroshynska, Natalia Kobrynska, Olha Kobylianska, Sylvester Lepky, Andriy Chaykovsky, Kost Pankivsky. In the second row: Ivan Kopach, Volodymyr Hnatiuk, Osyp Makovej, Mykhailo Hrushevsky, Ivan Franko, Oleksander Kolessa, Bohdan Lepky. Standing in the third row: Ivan Petrushevych, Filaret Kolessa, Yossyp Kyshakevych, Ivan Trush, Denys Lukianovych, Mykola Ivasyuk.

The Shevchenko Scientific Society (Ukrainian: Наукове товариство імені Т.Шевченка, romanized: Naukóve tovarýstvo imeni T.Shevchénka), founded in 1873, is a Ukrainian scientific society devoted to the promotion of scholarly research and publication.

Unlike the government-funded National Academy of Sciences of Ukraine, the society is a public organization. Banned in Ukraine by Soviet authorities after 1940, it reestablished its activities in the country during the fall of the Soviet Union in 1989. The society now has branches in several countries around the globe, such as the United States, Canada, Australia, and France.

The organisation is named after the famous Ukrainian poet, writer, artist, public and political figure Taras Shevchenko.

== History ==
=== Foundation to World War I ===
It was founded in 1873 in Lemberg (today Lviv), at that time the capital of the Austrian crown land of Kingdom of Galicia and Lodomeria, as a literary society devoted to the promotion of Ukrainian literature, and initially bore the name Shevchenko Society. Established soon after another cultural society, Prosvita (Enlightenment), from the very beginning it attracted financial and intellectual support of writers and patrons of Ukrainian background from the Russian Empire, where all publications in Ukrainian language had been prohibited. The idea to create the Shevchenko Scientific Society belonged to writer Oleksandr Konyskyi and Shevchenko's contemporary Dmytro Pylchykov, and it received financial support of Yelyzaveta Myloradovych-Skoropadska.

In 1893 the Shevchenko Scientific Society changed its statute and was transformed into a real scholarly multidisciplinary academy of sciences. The society issued its own publication Zapysky NTSh (Notes of the Shevchenko Scientific Society) and continued to be specialized in Ukrainian Studies. Throughout most of its history it had three sections: historical-philosophical, philological, and mathematical-medical-natural scientific. Under the presidency of historian Mykhailo Hrushevsky, it greatly expanded its activities, contributing to both humanities and physical sciences, law and medicine, but continuing to specialize chiefly on Ukrainian studies.

At the turn of the 20th century, together with the Cultural-Historical Museum, the Society and its head Mykhailo Hrushevsky took an interest in the history and archaeology of Ukraine. Leading archaeological experts in this work were Bohdan Janusz, Kateryna Antonovych-Melnyk and Volodymyr Antonovych.

One of the society's most prolific contributors was the poet, folklorist and literary historian Ivan Franko, who headed its philological section. During that period the society created several museums, libraries, and archives. By 1914, several hundred volumes of scholarly research and notices had been published by the society including over a hundred volumes of its Zapysky.

=== World War I to World War II ===
First World War interrupted the society's activities, particularly during the Russian occupation in 1914-1915, when its collection of works and print shop were destroyed. After the war and the Polish-Ukrainian conflict, Western Ukraine became part of Poland. During that time, the society lost its government subsidies, and was forced to carry on a precarious existence. Its major contributors were historians Vasyl Shchurat, Kyrylo Studynsky and Ivan Krypiakevych. One of the most important projects undertaken by the society was the publication of the first general alphabetic encyclopedia in the Ukrainian language.

The Soviet Union annexed the eastern part of the Second Polish Republic, including the city of Lviv, which capitulated to the Red Army on 22 September 1939. Upon their occupation of Lviv, the Soviets dissolved the society. Many of its members were arrested and either imprisoned or executed. Among the perished members were academicians as R. Zubyk, former Ukrainian minister I. Feshchenko-Chopivsky, parliamentarian Petro Franko, Kyrylo Studynsky and many others. During Nazi occupation, the society was unable to fully restore its activities.

=== Exile and return to Ukraine ===
In 1947, on the initiative of geographer and Nazi collaborator Volodymyr Kubiyovych, it was re-founded as an émigré scholarly society in Munich; the Society's European center was later moved to Paris. Other branches were also founded in New York City (1947), Toronto (1949) and Australia (1950), and throughout the Cold War it functioned as a federation of semi-independent societies.

During its period in emigration, under the editorship of Volodymyr Kubiyovych, the society published the great Entsyklopediia ukrainoznavstva (Encyclopedia of Ukrainian Studies), consisting of four major series: a Ukrainian-language thematic encyclopedia in three volumes, a Ukrainian-language alphabetic encyclopedia in 11 volumes, an English-language thematic encyclopedia in two volumes, and an English-language alphabetic encyclopedia in five volumes. The latter compilation, published in Canada under the title Encyclopedia of Ukraine, is available online.

In 1989 the society was reactivated in its Ukrainian homeland in Lviv, and once again undertook a large-scale research and publication program. Branches were soon founded in other Ukrainian cities and membership exceeded a thousand, including 125 full voting members.

== Presidents ==
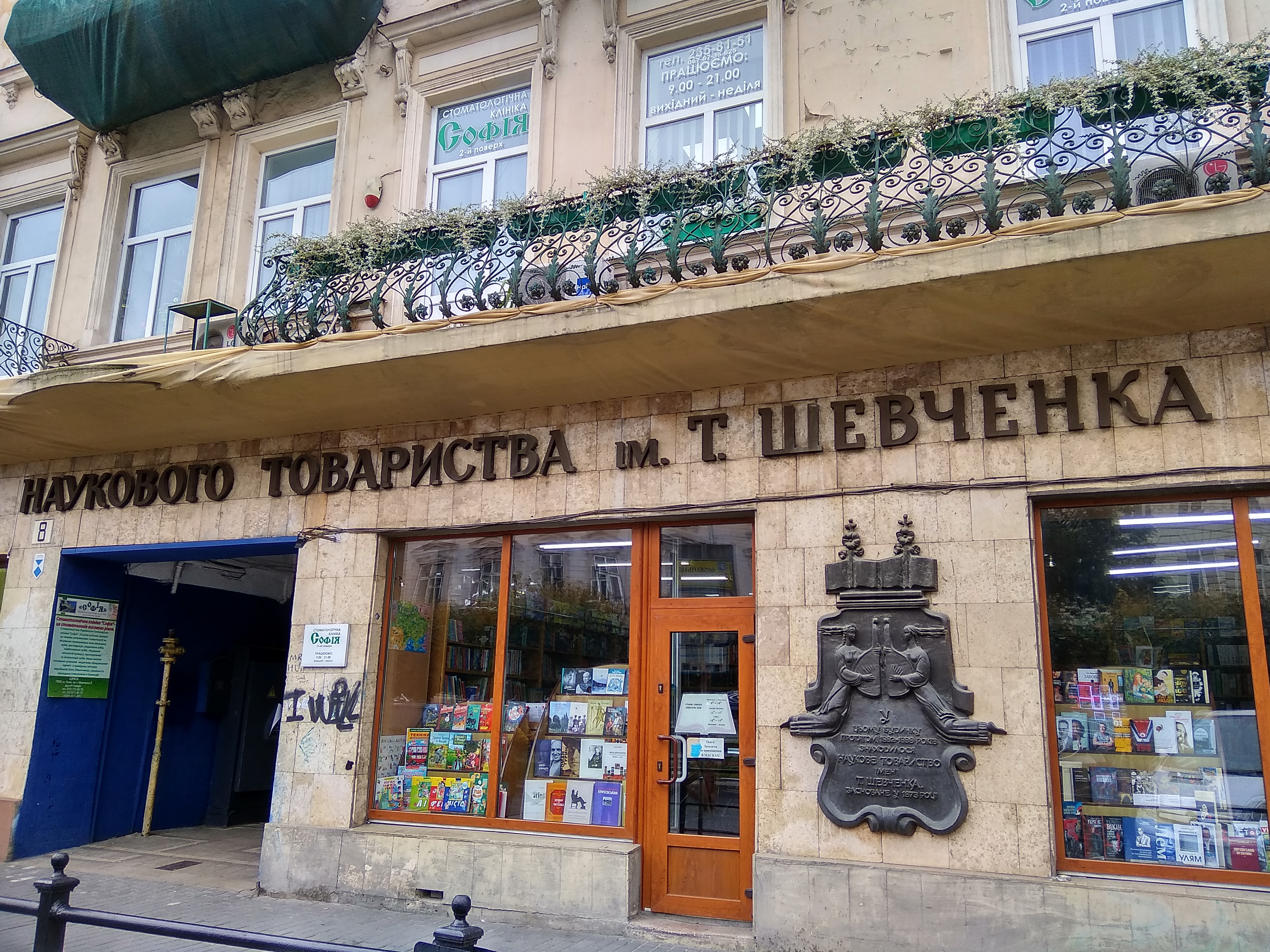
Bookshop and former headquarters of the society in Lviv

=== Ukraine ===
- 1873–1885 Kornylo Sushkevych
- 1885–1887 Sydir Hromnytsky
- 1887–1889 Demian Hladylovych
- 1889–1891 Sydir Hromnytsky
- 1891–1892 Demian Hladylovych
- 1892–1893 Yulian Tselevych
- 1893–1897 Oleksander Barvinsky
- 1897–1913 Mykhailo Hrushevsky
- 1913–1918 Stepan Tomashivsky
- 1919–1923 Vasyl Shchurat
- 1923–1932 Kyrylo Studynsky
- 1932–1935 Volodymyr Levytsky
- 1935–1940 Ivan Rakovsky
- 1940–1989 Soviet occupation and World War II
- 1989–2005 Oleh Romaniv
- 2005–2014 Oleh Kupchynsky
- 2014– Roman Kushnir

=== Europe ===
- ????–1952 Zenon Kuzela
- 1952–1985 Volodymyr Kubiyovych
- 1985–1997 Arkadiy Zhukovsky
- 1997–1999 Danylo Husar-Struk
- 2000–2011 Arkadiy Zhukovsky
- 2011– Stefan Dunikovsky

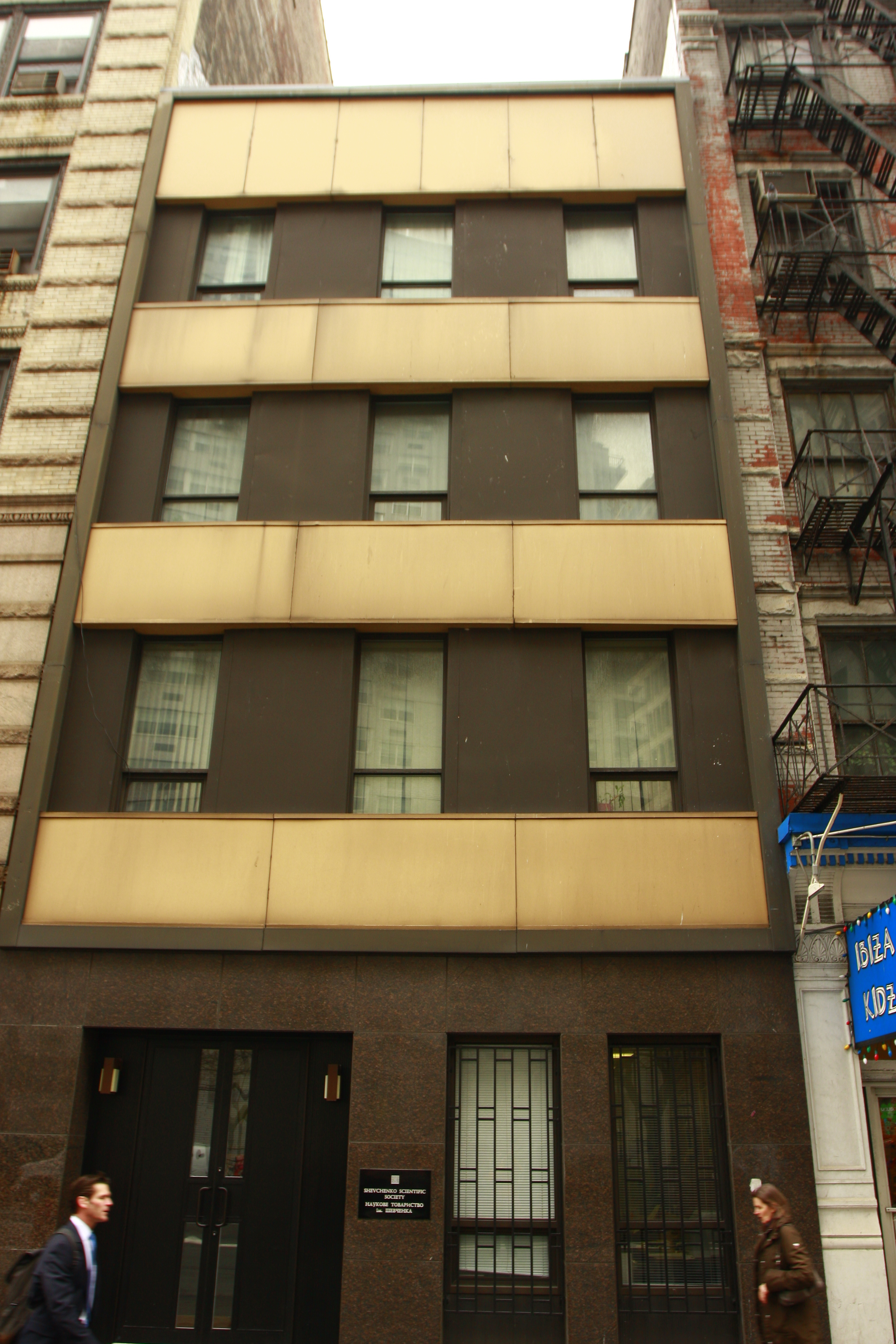
Shevchenko Scientific Society building in New York City.

=== United States ===
- 1947–1952 Mykola Chubaty
- 1952–1969 Roman Smal-Stocki
- 1969–1974 Matthew Stachiw
- 1974–1977 Osyp Andrushkiv
- 1977–1990 Jaroslaw Padoch
- 1990–2000 Leonid Rudnytzky
- 2000–2006 Larysa Zaleska Onyshkevych
- 2006–2012 Orest Popovych
- 2012–2018 George G. Grabowicz
- 2018– Halyna Hryn

=== Canada ===
- 1949–1973 Yevhen Vertyporokh
- 1974–1994 Bohdan Stebelsky
- 1994–2000 Vladimir Mackiw
- 2000– Daria Darevych

== Society press media ==
Literaturno-naukovy visnyk (English: Literary-scientific herald) was published 1898-1906, 1922-1932 in Lviv and 1907–1914, 1917-1919 in Kyiv. The chief editor was Ivan Franko, since 1905 - Mykhailo Hrushevsky.
