= Omelian Herman =

Ukrainian nationalist and Nazi collaborator (1915–after 1944)

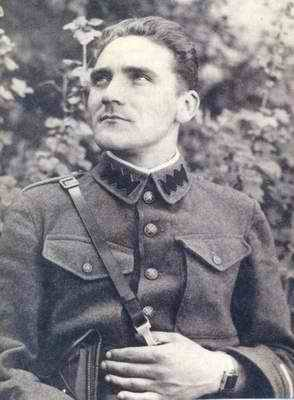
- Born: 13 January 1915
- Died: July 1944 (age 29) near Brody (today in Lviv region, Ukraine)
- Military career
- Units: Roland Battalion; 201st Schutzmannschaft Battalion; 1st Battalion, 29th Regiment, 14th SS Division Galicia
- Conflicts: Belarusian resistance during World War II; Battle of Brody (1944)

Omelian Herman (pseudonym "Orlyk") was an activist of the Organization of the Ukrainian Nationalists, a sergeant in the Roland Battalion, an adjutant to the commander of the 201st Schutzmannschaft Battalion, and a company commander in the 1st Battalion, 29nd Regiment, 14th SS Division Galicia.

== Military career ==
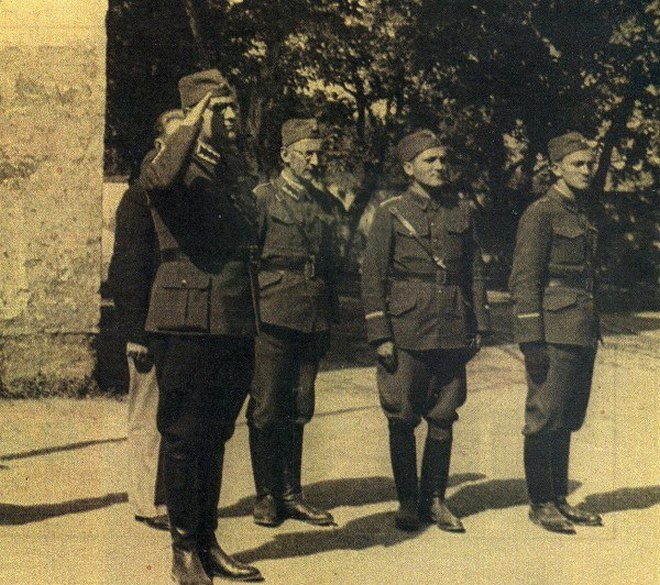
Sergeants of the Roland Battalion, from left to right: Richard Yary, Yevhen Pobihushchyi, platoon commanders Omelian Herman and Liubomyr Ortynskyi.

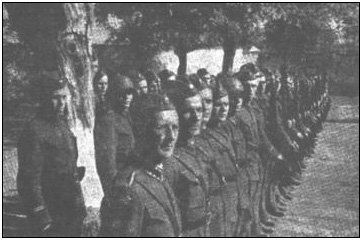
A company of the Roland Battalion at the Saubersdorf training camp. In the first row, from left to right: major Yevhen Pobihushchyi, platoon commanders Liubomyr Ortynskyi, Omelian Herman and Ivan Makarevych

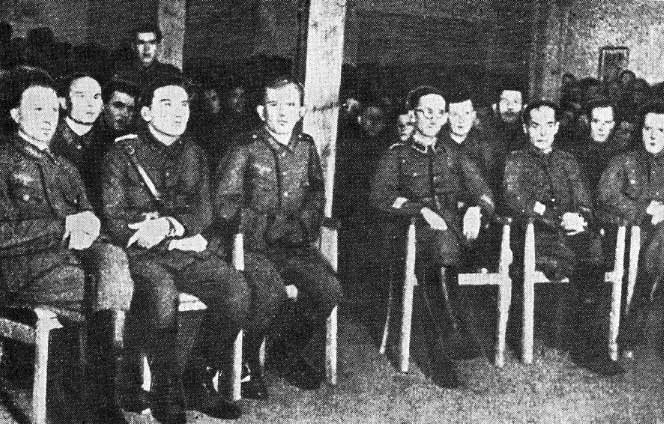
The merger of the Roland Battalion and the Nachtigall Battalion into the 201st Schutzmannschaft Battalion in Frankfurt an der Oder. In the first row, from left to right: Vasyl Sydor, Omelian Herman, Roman Shukhevych, Yevhen Pobihushchyi, Volodymyr Lun

He was an active participant in the Ukrainian Nationalist Militias and served as the commander of a platoon in the Roland Battalion.

After the formation of the 201st Schutzmannschaft Battalion, he served as the adjutant to its commander, Yevhen Pobihushchyi. He distinugished himself in battle against the Soviet partisans. Pobihushchyi wrote in his memoirs:

...having arrived early at the office, I did not find my adjutant, Omelian Herman. It was unheard of for him to oversleep; that had never happened before.

Herman arrived around noon with a group of our soldiers and told me that not far from our post, partisans had mined the road ambushed a convoy of vehicles carrying grain.

When mines began exploding and shooting started, he assembled a group of soldiers, including members of the headquarters staff, ran to the aid of the convoy that had been attacked, and successfully forced the partisans away.

According to Ukrainian historian Roman Ponomarenko, after the disbandment of the 201st Battalion, Herman and Pobihushchyi were among a group of fifteen of the battalion's officers who did not follow Roman Shukhevych into the underground Ukrainian Insurgent Army but instead went on to form part of the officer corps of the 14th SS Division Galicia.

Between December 1943 and January 1944, Herman travelled to the Brody district, the Zolochiv district, and the Peremyshliany district, as part of a divisional recruitment campaign throughout Galicia. He met with local officials and representatives of the Ukrainian intelligentsia, and organized meetings in various towns and villages. In a report of his activities, he noted that he had received a positive reception from the Ukrainian population but had encountered hostility from the Polish population and Soviet sympathizers. During these meetings, he also advised Ukrainian youth not to engage in partisan activities. 97 volunteers were recruited to the Galicia Division through his efforts: 7 in Brody, 20 in Zolochiv, and 70 in Peremyshliany.

In June 1944, Herman was made a company commander in the 1st Battalion of the Galicia Division's 29th Waffen-Grenadier Regiment. Ukrainian historian Andrii Bolianovskyi lists Herman as the commander of the 1st Company (sotnia) of the 1st Battalion (kurin) as of 28 June, during the time of the deployment of the division into the lands of western Ukraine. However, Navruzov writes that Herman was the commander of the battalion's 2nd Company, claiming that divisional commander Fritz Freitag appointed Herman to this post after dismissing the previous commander, Obersturmführer Bauff, a German, who had stamped on flowers arranged in the shape of a Ukrainian trident outside the company headquarters, having mistaken it for a communist symbol.

Pobihushchyi's memoirs contain a different explanation of how Herman became a company commander: 29th Regiment commander Friedrich Dern considered taking Herman as his adjutant, but preferred to have a German in this position, and assigned Herman to command a company instead.

Herman took part in the July 1944 battle of Brody, as commander of the 2nd sotnia of the 1st kurin. On 19 July, Herman and his company (sotnia) went into combat after the remnants of the 29th Regiment received an order to support Wehrmacht units defending Olesko. He was later killed in action at some point during the battle.
