= St. Volodymyr Ukrainian Cemetery =

Cemetery in Ontario, Canada

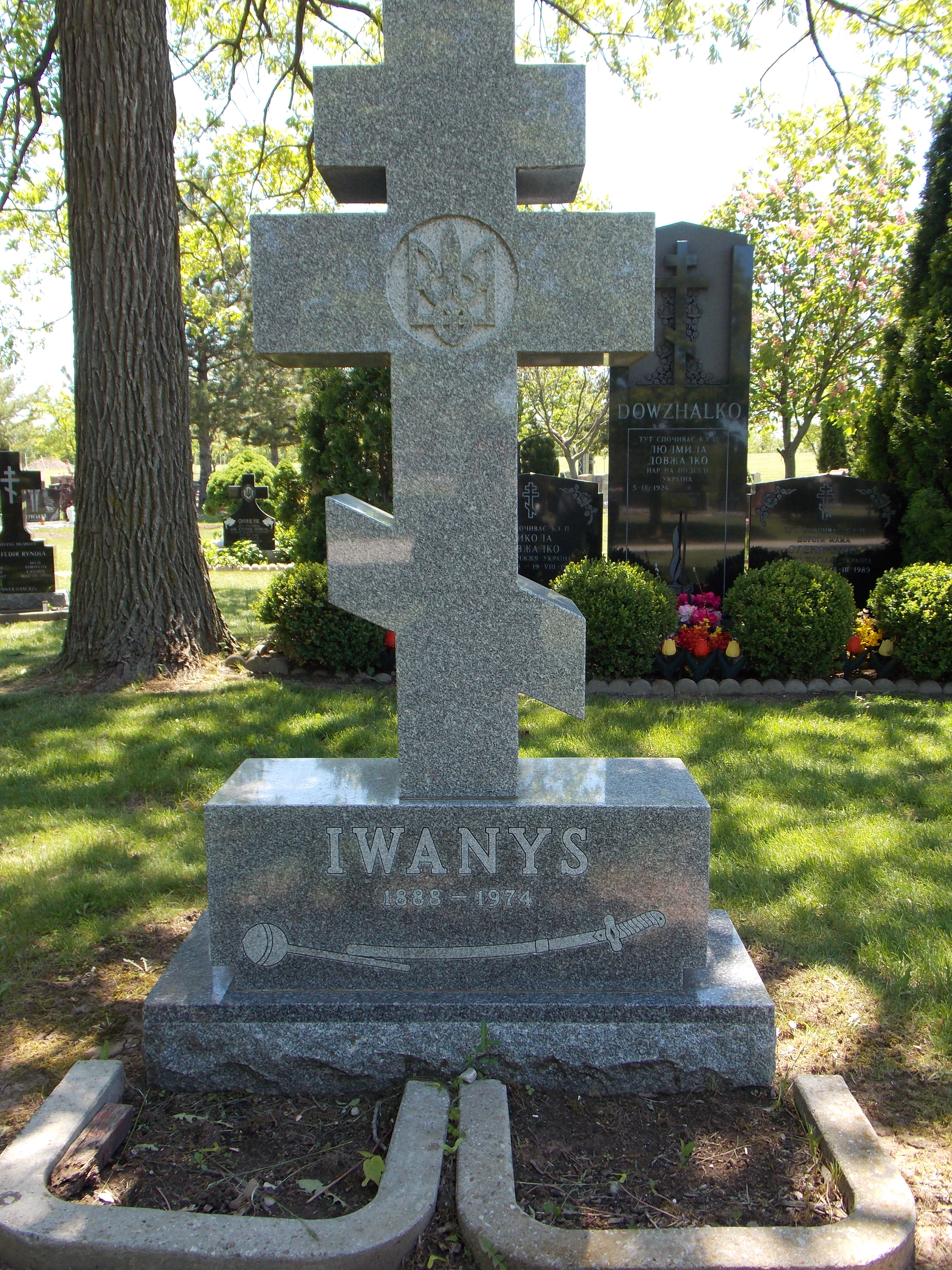
- Grave of Vasily Nikolaevich Ivanis
- Interactive map of St. Volodymyr Ukrainian Cemetery

Details
- Established: 1984
- Coordinates: 43°27′13″N 79°44′47″W

St. Volodymyr Ukrainian Cemetery, marketed as West Oak Memorial Gardens, is a cemetery in Oakville, Ontario, established in 1984. According to the cemetery's website, it is operated by St. Volodymyr Cathedral. The cemetery offers both in ground burial and burial vaults in perpetuity, and is open to all those of Christian faith.

== 14th Waffen Grenadier Division of the SS emblem controversy ==
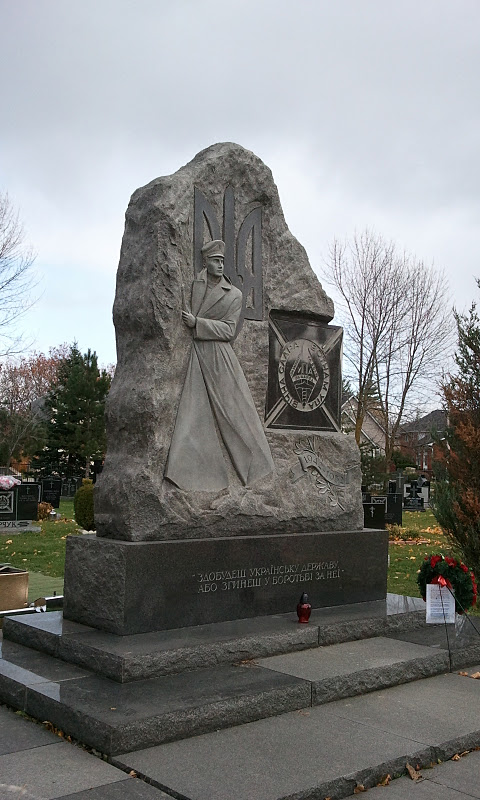
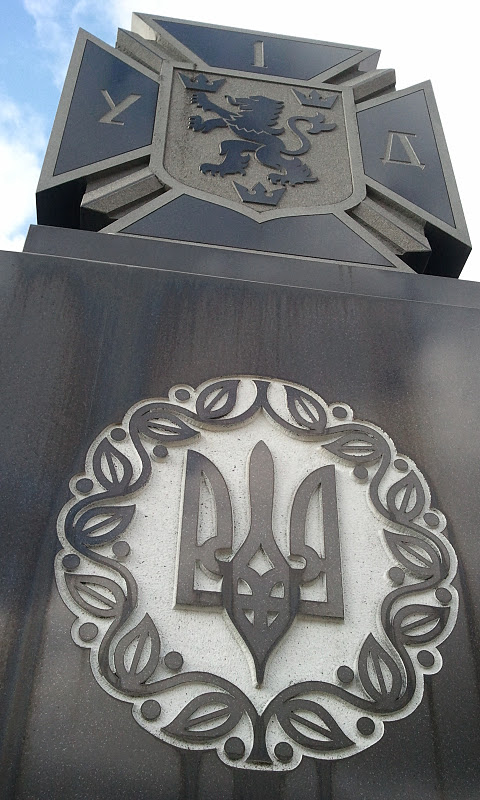
Monument to the Glory of the UPA (left) and cenotaph with emblem of 14th Waffen Grenadier Division of the SS (1st Galician). (right)

On 26 May 1988, Monument to the Glory of the UPA, a memorial to members of the Ukrainian Insurgent Army, was erected. Soon after, a cenotaph was erected, displaying the emblem of 14th Waffen Grenadier Division of the SS (1st Galician), and an inscription dedicating it "To Those Who Died For the Freedom of Ukraine".

On October 14, 2017, the Embassy of Russia in Ottawa's Twitter account posted images of the monuments, alongside a bust of Roman Shukhevych in Edmonton, with a caption referring to them as "monuments to Nazi collaborators." Alexandra Chyczij, vice president of the Ukrainian Canadian Congress, called these claims "long-disproven fabrications". John-Paul Himka, a University of Alberta scholar, stated about these monuments, “The fact is the Ukrainian government and the diaspora have been honouring Holocaust perpetrators and war criminals for a long time.” Author Per Anders Rudling has also stated on the topic "Unfortunately, the Ukrainian-Canadian organizations have not shown real readiness to discuss these issues... On the whole there's a great deal of resistance".

Around June 21, 2020, the cenotaph was vandalized, with spray paint reading "Nazi war monument". Halton Regional Police Service initially reported that the vandalism was a "hate motivated offense", and refused to release images of the graffiti. Halton police later stated that the graffiti may have been targeting Ukrainians either as a whole or in the area, and during the investigation they did not "consider that the identifiable group targeted by the graffiti was Nazis.". Police Chief Tanner further questioned the existence of the monument, stating on X, “The most unfortunate part of all this is that any such monument would exist in the first place.”. In July 2020, Halton Regional Police released a statement saying that the message written on a controversial monument was no longer being considered a hate offence.

In February 2024, the cenotaph displaying the emblem of 14th Waffen Grenadier Division of the SS (1st Galician) was removed, but it may be returned at some point in time.

== Notable burials ==
- Roman Danylak – Canadian Ukrainian Catholic bishop.
- Eddie Harsch - Canadian keyboardist and member of The Black Crowes.
- Gregory Hines – an American dancer, actor, choreographer, and singer.
- Negrita Jayde – was a Canadian female bodybuilding champion, and Author.
- Mykola Plaviuk - fourth and final President of the Ukrainian People's Republic in exile.
- Ulas Samchuk – a writer, publicist, journalist.
- John Yaremko – first Ukrainian-Canadian to be elected to the Ontario legislature.
- Vasyl Mykolayovych Iwanys (Vasily Nikolaevich Ivanis) – Ukrainian economist and historian, the last chairman of the Kuban Rada

== See also ==
- Roman Shukhevych statue (Edmonton)
- List of Nazi monuments in Canada
