= Memorials in Canada to Nazis and Nazi collaborators =

List of monuments in Canada

Canada has several monuments and memorials that to varying degrees commemorate people and groups accused of collaboration with Nazi forces.

Monuments and memorials include or have included two monuments in Ontario and Alberta connected with the Waffen-SS, a statue of Roman Shukhevych, streets and parks named after Alexis Carrel and Philipp Lenard, a mountain named after Philippe Pétain, and two streets named after a commander of Nazi German forces and his ship. There are two monuments to members of the 14th Waffen Grenadier Division of the SS (1st Galician), which have caused controversy.

== Existing ==
=== Monument Honouring Four Estonian Waffen-SS Leaders at Seedrioru Summer Camp ===
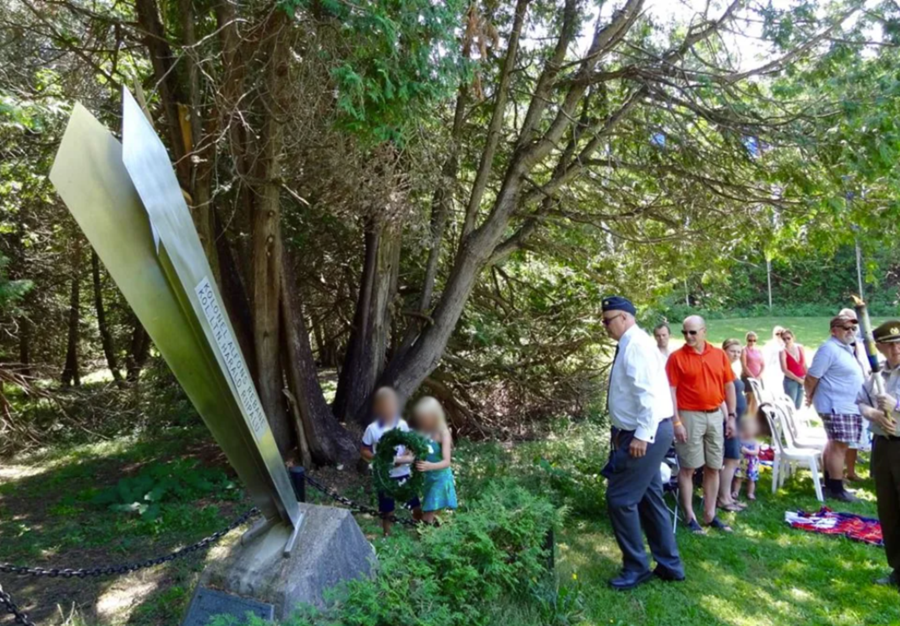

In July 2024, Friends of Simon Wiesenthal Center (FSWC) exposed the existence of a monument honouring Nazis at a children’s summer camp in Elora, Ontario called Seedrioru. FSWC uncovered that the camp had long been commemorating Estonian members of the Waffen-SS, an elite military wing of the Nazi Party known for its involvement in war crimes and atrocities during the Holocaust. The Waffen-SS as a whole was classified as a criminal organization during the Nuremberg Trials due to its direct participation in genocide, ethnic cleansing, and other war crimes.

The monument, erected in the late 1970s, is shaped like a sword and bore the names of Colonel Alfons Rebane, Harald Riipalu, Paul Maitla, and Harald Nugiseks. All four, who were members of the 20th Waffen Grenadier Division of the SS (1st Estonian), were awarded the Knight’s Cross of the Iron Cross, Nazi Germany’s highest military honour. The 20th Waffen Grenadier Division emblem was engraved at the bottom of the memorial monument.

FSWC’s investigation further revealed that at least one of the men, Harald Riipalu, had commanded the 36th Police Battalion in Estonia, a unit that took part in the August 7, 1942, massacre of almost all of the remaining Jews in the town of Nowogrodek in Belarus. Another of the Nazi collaborators, Alfons Rebane, was originally a commander of a unit within the Estonian Home Guard that was involved in criminal acts, including in the roundup of 200 Roma people and 950 Jews

FSWC also discovered that at least 15 individuals listed on the camp’s website as honorary members of the Canadian Estonian community who played “an integral part of the formation and sustainment of Seedrioru” have the same names as people with direct ties to the Waffen-SS. These include former Seedrioru chairman August Jurs, author of the book Estonian Freedom Fighters in World War Two, who served in the Wehrmacht, the armed forces of Nazi Germany’s Third Reich, and in the 20th Waffen Grenadier Division of the SS.

FSWC also found photographs on the camp’s website, which were immediately removed following the exposé, showing individuals, including children, laying wreaths and gathering at the monument. The images depicted wreaths being laid in remembrance, reinforcing a tradition of honouring these individuals as heroes.

Following FSWC’s revelations, the camp’s leadership faced significant public scrutiny including in the media. In response, they removed all incriminating names and Nazi-associated symbols from the monument and deleted related content from their website. However, the monument itself remains standing at the camp.

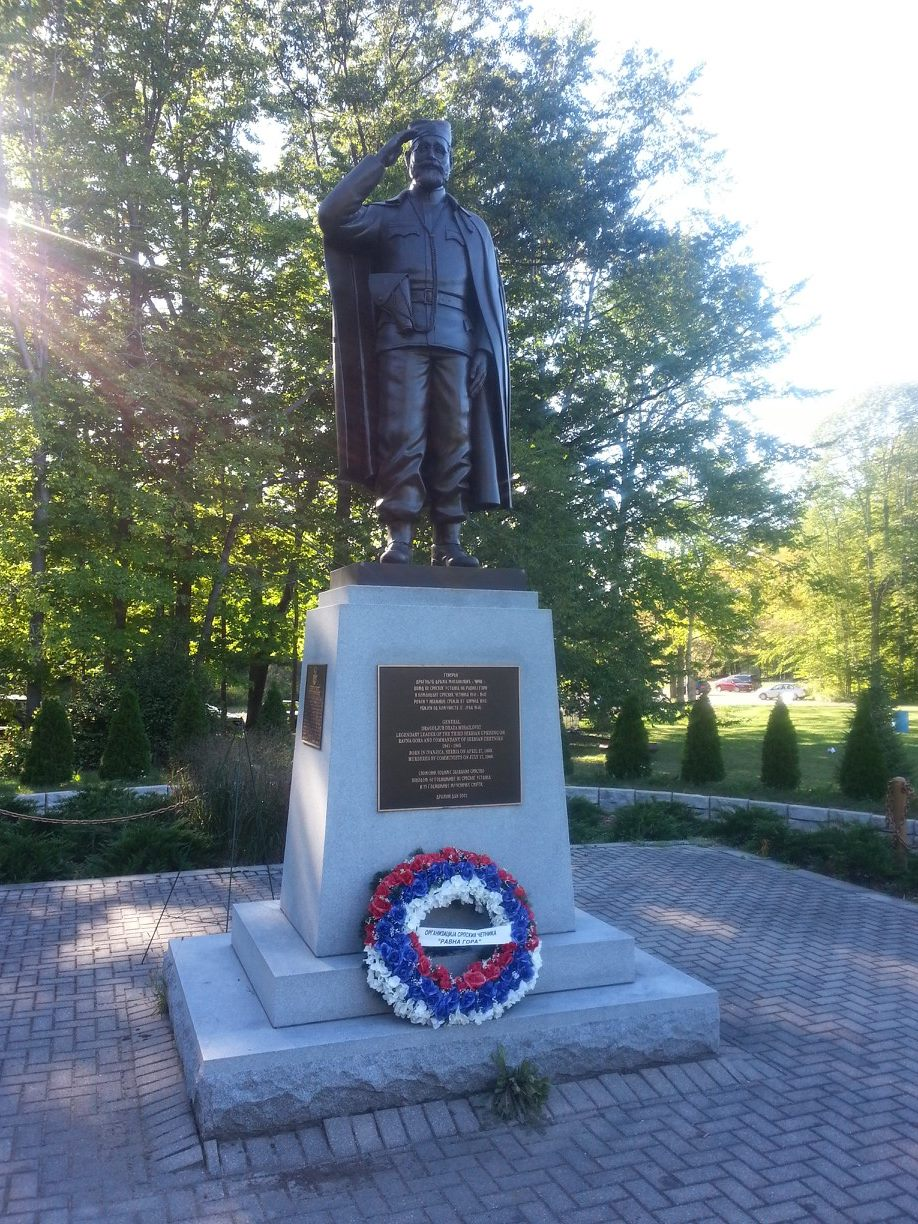
Draža Mihailović Monument in Hamilton, Ontario.

=== Memorial to the Victims of Communism ===
The Memorial to the Victims of Communism in Ottawa, while not directly linked to Nazis and their collaborators, came under fire prior to its unveiling when the Department of Canadian Heritage was told that more than half of the 550 names on the memorial should be removed because of potential links to the Nazis or questions about affiliations with fascist groups. The memorial was unveiled in December 2024.

=== Draža Mihailović statue, Hamilton ===
There is a statue in Hamilton, Ontario of Draža Mihailović, a Yugoslav Serb general during World War II. He was the leader of the Chetniks, a royalist and Serbian nationalist movement and guerrilla force, who collaborated with the Nazis following the German invasion of Yugoslavia in 1941.

=== Ukrainian ===
Monuments in Canada to members of the Ukrainian Waffen-SS have been vandalized by activists at differing times as "Nazi monuments", as have monuments to members of the Ukrainian Insurgent Army. Leaders of the Canadian Ukrainian community said the Ukrainian monuments are not related to Nazism.

==== Roman Shukhevych statue, Edmonton ====
The Shukhevych statue vandalised (left) and normally (right)

The bronze bust of Ukrainian nationalist leader Roman Shukhevych, who collaborated with the Nazis from February 1941 to December 1942 as commanding officer of the Nachtigall Battalion in early 1941, and as a Hauptmann of the German Schutzmannschaft 201 auxiliary police battalion in late 1941 and 1942, units which were complicit in the Galicia-Volhynia massacres of ethnic Poles and in the Lviv pogroms (1941) against Jews. The bust was built in 1972 by Ukrainian World War II veterans on private land near the Ukrainian Youth Unity Complex in Edmonton, Alberta. The statue was vandalised in 2019 when someone added the words "Nazi scum". It was vandalised again in 2021 when someone added the words "Actual Nazi" in red paint.

==== Memorial at St. Michael’s Cemetery, Edmonton ====
Vandalism of the memorial at St. Michael's Cemetery

A memorial reading For those who fought for Ukraine’s Freedom was constructed in St. Michael’s Cemetery in Edmonton in 1976 by former members of the Ukrainian Waffen-SS division: 14th Waffen Grenadier Division of the SS (1st Galician). The International Military Tribunal's verdict at the Nuremberg Trials declared the entire Waffen-SS a "criminal organization" guilty of war crimes but the Canadian Deschênes Commission of October 1986 concluded this Ukrainian division should not be indicted as a group.

In 2021 the memorial was vandalized by painting "Nazi monument to 14th Waffen SS". A spokesperson for the Canadian Friends of Simon Wiesenthal Center said "These monuments are nothing less than a glorification and celebration of those who actively participated in Holocaust crimes as well the mass murder of Polish civilians." Jewish organizations requested the removal of the damaged memorial. However, the Ukrainian Catholic Church called the vandalism "part of the decades-long Russian disinformation campaign against Ukraine and Ukrainians to create a false Nazi image of Ukrainian freedom fighters." The St. Michael’s monument is dedicated to "Fighters for the Freedom of Ukraine". One of its plaques is an abbreviation for the First Division Division of the Ukrainian National Army. On April 25, 1945, the Waffen-SS Galizien was officially reorganized as the First Division of the Ukrainian National Army, and swore a new oath of loyalty to the Ukrainian people.

Bernie Farber of the Canadian Jewish Congress wrote that "removing this monument will require the Ukrainian-Canadian community to take a hard look at its own history." University of Alberta historian Jars Balan told CBC News that the history of the monument and the Shukhevych statue were "complicated", saying that some people had fought in German uniforms in order to achieve Ukrainian independence.

==== Memorial at St. Volodymyr Ukrainian Cemetery, Oakville ====
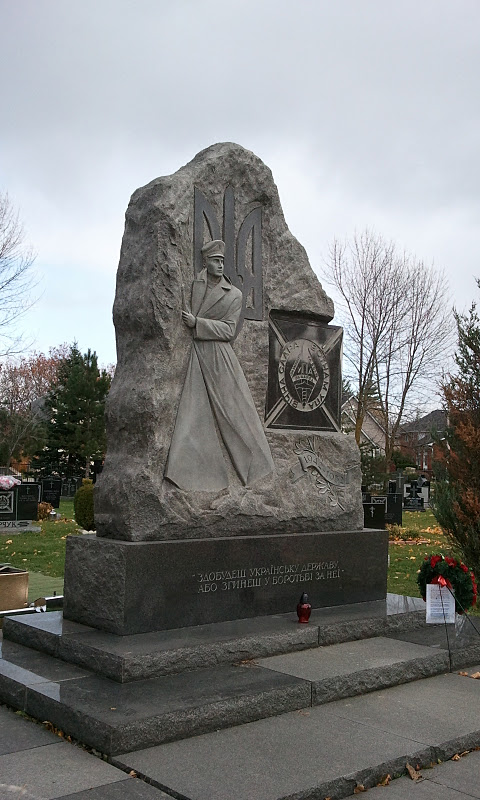
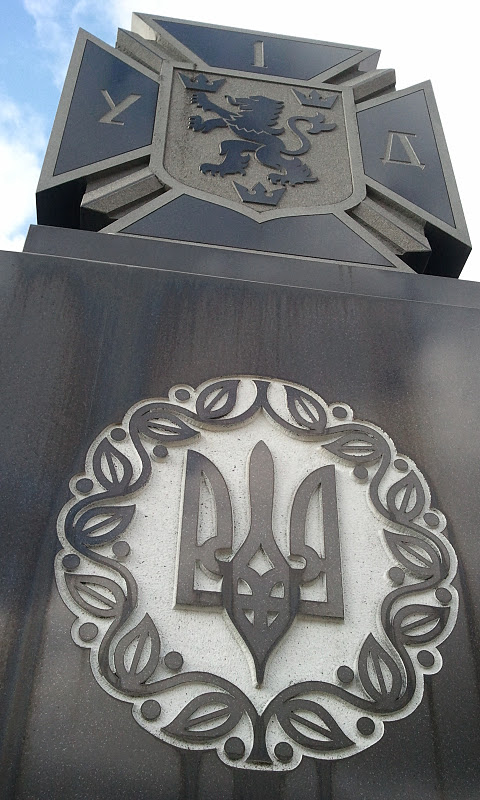
Monument to the Glory of the UPA (left) and cenotaph (right) at the St. Volodymyr Ukrainian Cemetery

A granite memorial entitled Pamiatnyk Slavy UPA (English: Monument to the Glory of the UPA) celebrating the Ukrainian Insurgent Army, a Ukrainian nationalist force, was inaugurated on May 26, 1988, in the St. Volodymyr Ukrainian Cemetery in Oakville, Ontario. A cenotaph to veterans of the 14th Waffen Grenadier Division of the SS (1st Galician) was added shortly afterwards, with the SS division's insignia.

The SS cenotaph was vandalised in mid-June 2020 when someone added the words "Nazi war monument". Canadian police apologized for originally stating that the vandalism was motivated by hate.

Both monuments were the subject of complaints from the Russian Embassy to Canada in 2017. Ihor Michalchyshyn, the CEO of the Ukrainian Canadian Congress accused Russia of obfuscation.

Jewish B’nai Brith organization and the Canadian Polish Congress called for the SS monument's removal in a joint statement, saying that the presence of monuments that whitewash the Holocaust and Nazi ideology is unacceptable in Canada. Oakville Mayor Rob Burton stated that he would remove the SS monument but could not, as municipalities did not have the right to regulate private cemeteries.

In March 2024, the monument was finally removed but it was also reported that it might just be repaired and might eventually return.

=== Streets and Parks named after Alexis Carrel ===
In 2015 CTV News reported that in Quebec a street in Gatineau was named after Alexis Carrel, as well a street and park named after him in 1972 and 1988 respectively in Montreal community Rivière des Prairies, and a park and streets named after him in Boisbriand and Châteauguay. Carrel won the Nobel Prize in Medicine in 1912, and was a supporter of eugenics and the Nazis, advocating for the elimination of "undesirables", and was involved in the Vichy government of France. In 2015 the street in Gatineau was renamed after Marie Curie. In 2017 it was announced that the street and the park in Rivière des Prairies, Montreal would be renamed. This followed a campaign from the Centre for Israel and Jewish Affairs of Quebec, who said that they hoped Boisbriand and Châteauguay would follow the lead of Montreal and Gatineau.

=== Landmarks named after Charles Bedaux ===
In 2022, the Toronto Star reported that the Peace River Regional District was asked to reconsider their lack of input over the province's proposal to change the names of Bedaux Pass and Mount Bedaux, both of which are named after French-American industrialist Charles Bedaux. The two monuments were named after Bedaux, who was later arrested for collaborating with Nazi Germany and killed himself in prison in 1944, since he'd led a famous subarctic expedition through the region in 1934.

== Removed ==
=== Mount Pétain ===
A mountain on the border of British Columbia and Alberta was named for Nazi collaborator Philippe Pétain until British Columbia removed its name in 2022 following Alberta's decision to remove the mountain's name in 2019. It was named for Pétain in 1919, at which point he was considered a hero for leading forces to victory in the 1916 Battle of Verdun in World War I. Later, during World War II, Pétain led the collaborationist Government of Vichy France.

=== Langsdorff Drive & Graf Spee Crescent ===
The town of Ajax, Ontario is named for HMS Ajax, which fought in the Battle of the River Plate in the Second World War. In the municipality, one of the streets was named Langsdorff Drive in honour of Hans Langsdorff, a battleship captain who commanded German forces in the battle. The naming was supported by the River Plate Veterans Association. The street received a naming ceremony, with Langsdorff's daughter and son-in-law in attendance.

This name was changed in 2021 in response to public opposition. In 2020 Ajax tried to honour Langsdorff and his ship the Admiral Graf Spee by naming a street Graf Spee Crescent. This was also changed after the public became aware and brought it the attention of Ajax Mayor Shaun Collier. Collier put forward a motion to change this name, stating, "We did Langsdorff, which I did support ... This, I think, has crossed the line a little bit." Many of Ajax's streets are named after people involved in the Battle of the River Plate.

=== Philipp Lenard Street ===
A street in Gatineau, Quebec, used to be named after Philipp Lenard, who won the Nobel Prize in physics in 1905. He was also a strong supporter of the Nazis and acted as an advisor to Hitler. In 2015 the street was renamed after Albert Einstein following a campaign from the Centre for Israel and Jewish Affairs of Quebec.

== See also ==
- Monuments in the United States to Nazi collaborators
- List of Holocaust memorials and museums in Canada
- List of Holodomor memorials and monuments in Canada
- Monument of Lihula, Estonia
- Monuments to Stepan Bandera
- Yaroslav Hunka scandal
