= Yevhen Pobihushchyi-Ren =

Ukrainian military commander and Axis collaborator

Yevhen Pobihushchyi
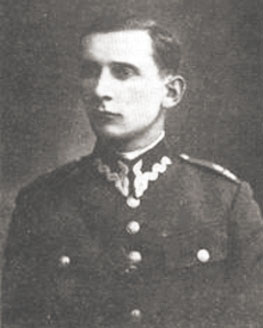
- Pobihushchyi-Ren as a Polish Army officer, 1936
- Native name: Євген Побігущий
- Nicknames: Yevhen Pobihushchyi-Ren; Yevhen Berkut
- Born: 15 November 1901; Postolivka, Ternopil Oblast, Kingdom of Galicia and Lodomeria, Austria-Hungary (now Ukraine)
- Died: 28 May 1995 (aged 93) Haar, Bavaria, Germany
- Buried: Munich Waldfriedhof (48.102778°N 11.493611°E)
- Allegiance: West Ukrainian People's Republic; Second Polish Republic; Nazi Germany; United Kingdom
- Branch: (West Ukrainian People's Republic) Ukrainian Galician Army; (Second Polish Republic) Polish Armed Forces; Schutzstaffel; British Army
- Service years: 1918–1919; 1925–1939; 1941–1945; 1954–1958
- Rank: Major
- Commands: Roland Battalion; 14th Waffen Grenadier Division of the SS (1st Galician)
- Conflicts: Polish–Ukrainian War; World War II; Invasion of Poland; Battle of the Bzura; Eastern Front; Lvov–Sandomierz offensive
- Awards: Order of St. Sylvester
- Alma mater: Adam Mickiewicz University in Poznań

Yevhen Pavlovych Pobihushchyi-Ren (Note: Ukrainian: Євген Павлович Побігущий-Рен Polish: Jewhen Pawłowycz Pobihuszczy-Ren) (né Pobihushchyi; (Note: Ukrainian: Побігущий Polish: Pobihuszczy) 15 November 1901 – 28 May 1995) was a Ukrainian military commander and Axis collaborator who served as commander of the Roland Battalion and Schutzmannschaft Battalion 201, and as one of the commanders of 14th Waffen Grenadier Division of the SS (1st Galician).

== Early life and career ==
Yevhen Pavlovych Pobihushchyi was born on 15 November 1901, in the village of Postolivka, Ternopil Oblast, in what was then the Kingdom of Galicia and Lodomeria within Austria-Hungary into a family of Ukrainian educators. At the age of 17, he joined the Ukrainian Galician Army following the founding of the West Ukrainian People's Republic, and participated in the Polish–Ukrainian War as an artilleryman. He returned home in May 1920 with the rank of senior corporal.

Following the war, he joined Plast, and was arrested in 1920 for refusing to celebrate Polish independence. Pobihushchyi originally intended to take over his father's school, studying at both the Ukrainian Secret University in Lviv and the Greek Catholic Saint John the Baptist Theological Lyceum in Stanislawów (now Ivano-Frankivsk). However, due to Polish opposition to Ukrainian-language education, he could not get a job and was conscripted into the Polish Armed Forces infantry in 1925. Beginning in 1928, he studied at the Adam Mickiewicz University in Poznań, eventually earning a doctorate in political economy. At this time, he also unsuccessfully sought a doctorate from the Ukrainian Free University, being rejected in part due to his alleged ties to the Organisation of Ukrainian Nationalists (OUN), a far-right political organisation advocating for Ukrainian independence from Poland.

== World War II ==
Following the invasion of Poland in 1939, Pobihushchyi fought against German forces and served at the Battle of the Bzura, taking over the 3rd Battalion of the 57th Greater Poland Infantry Division following the death of its commander, major Józef Kewpinski. Shortly before the end of the Battle of the Bzura, Pobihushchyi was captured on 17 September 1939, and interned with other ethnic Ukrainians and Georgians in Luckenwalde's Stalag III-A, near Berlin.

In the spring of 1940, Pobihushchyi, along with other Ukrainian prisoners of war, was released as part of a deal struck between OUN ideologue Dmytro Dontsov and the German government. Following his release, he initially studied the German language in Berlin. At the same time, he joined the Wehrmacht as a translator.

=== Roland Battalion and Schutzmannschaft Battalion 201 ===
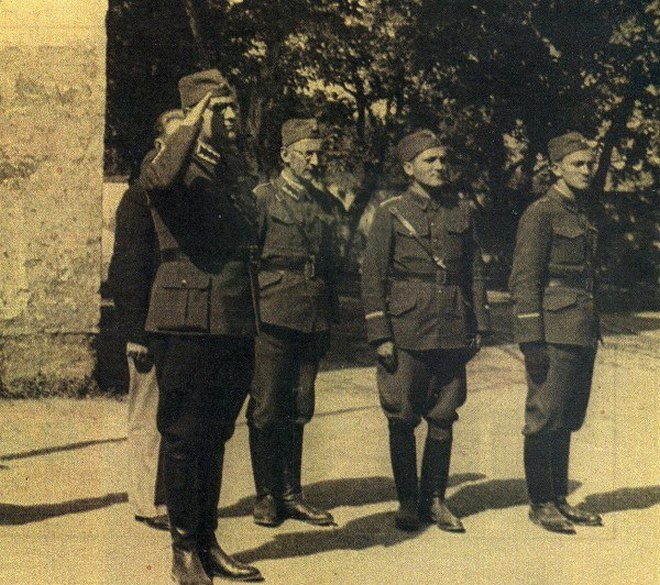
Sergeants of the Roland Battalion, from left to right: Richard Yary, Yevhen Pobihushchyi, platoon commanders Omelian Herman and Liubomyr Ortynskyi.

In May 1941, Pobihushchyi moved to Vienna, where he trained soldiers as part of the Ukrainian Nationalist Squadrons. The squadrons were split into two battalions; the Nachtigall Battalion, led by Roman Shukhevych, and the Roland Battalion, under Pobihushchyi. In November 1941, the Nachtigall and Roland Battalions were transformed into Schutzmannschaft Battalion 201, which Pobihushchyi commanded. Schutzmannschaft Battalion 201 was active both in fighting the Belarusian partisans and killings of civilians, including Jews, though the role of the battalion in the Holocaust remains to be studied in depth.

=== Leadership of the 14th Division of the SS ===
In January 1943, Schutzmannschaft Battalion 201 was disbanded for refusing to renew their contracts, and their leaders were detained in Lviv. While Shukhevych fled, Pobihushchyi remained imprisoned until Easter Saturday 1943, and was to be executed or sent to Majdanek concentration camp until Alfred Bisanz, a Galician German, successfully negotiated his release in return for participation in the creation of the 14th Waffen Grenadier Division of the SS (1st Galician). Pobihushchyi was among the staff of the division until 1944. He later went on to refer to his time in imprisonment as "the worst period in [his] life."

== Later life and death ==
Following the end of World War II, Pobihushchyi found himself in the British occupation zone in Germany, and joined the British Army, overseeing the Ukrainian Guard from 1954 to 1958. During this time, he also served as an organisational officer of the Ukrainian Red Cross Society in Germany and taught at Ukrainian displaced persons camps. At this time, he and his wife changed their surname from Pobihushchyi to Pobihushchyi-Ren, likely to avoid extradition to the Soviet Union.

Pobihushchyi-Ren also worked with OUN leader Yaroslav Stetsko as part of the Anti-Bolshevik Bloc of Nations and was heavily active both in contributing to Ukrainian publishing and the Ukrainian Greek Catholic Church. He served as head of the Ukrainian Christian Movement for a period of ten years and as head in West Germany from 1965 until his death, and was one of the organisers of the construction of the Cathedral of the Intercession of the Mother of God and of St. Andrew, for which he was awarded the Order of St. Sylvester by Pope John Paul II in 1982. The same year, Pobihushchyi-Ren published his memoirs, Mosaic of My Memories (Ukrainian: Мозаїка моїх споминів, romanized: Mozayika moyikh spomyniv) in London, and he also donated a portion of his library to the University of Lviv after Ukraine gained independence from the Soviet Union.

Pobihushchyi-Ren died on 28 May 1995, in Haar, Bavaria, near Munich in Germany.
