= Liubomyr Ortynskyi =

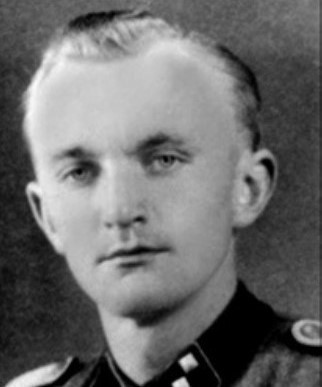
- Born: 7 June 1919; Mykhailevychi (today Lviv Oblast, Ukraine)
- Died: 22 July 1961 (aged 42); Hunter, New York
- Military career
- Rank: Untersturmführer
- Units: Roland Battalion; 201st Schutzmannschaft Battalion; 14th SS Division Galicia
- Conflicts: Battle of Brody (1944)

Liubomyr Ortynskyi (7 June 1919 – 22 July 1961) was an activist of the Organization of Ukrainian Nationalists, a sergeant in the Roland Battalion, a platoon commander in the 201st Schutzmannschaft Battalion, and a sergeant in the 29th Waffen-Grenadier Regiment of the 14th SS Division Galicia.

After World War II, he served as the head of the Brotherhood of Former Soldiers of the 1st Ukrainian Division and as a member of the Ukrainian Supreme Liberation Council.

== Life ==
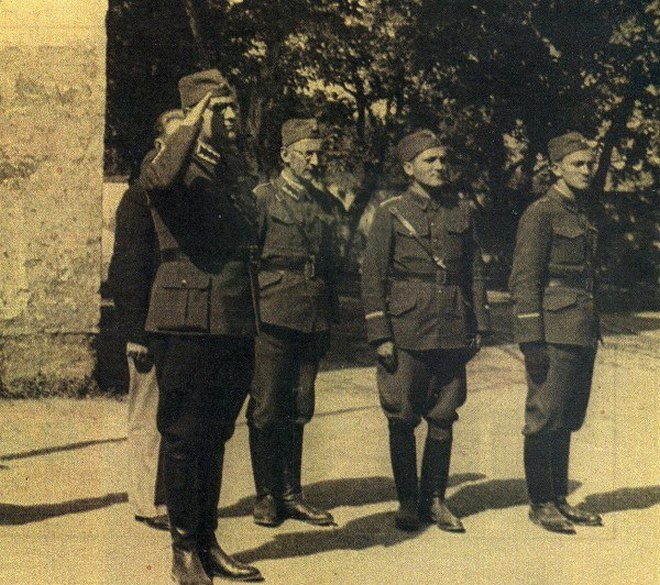
Sergeants of the Roland Battalion, from left to right: Richard Yary, Yevhen Pobihushchyi, platoon commanders Omelian Herman and Liubomyr Ortynskyi.

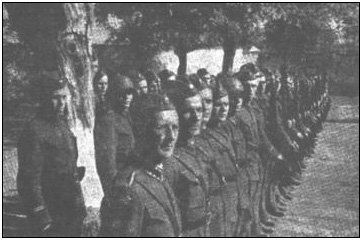
A company of the Roland Battalion at the Saubersdorf training camp. In the first row, from left to right: major Yevhen Pobihushchyi, platoon commanders Liubomyr Ortynskyi, Omelian Herman and Ivan Makarevych

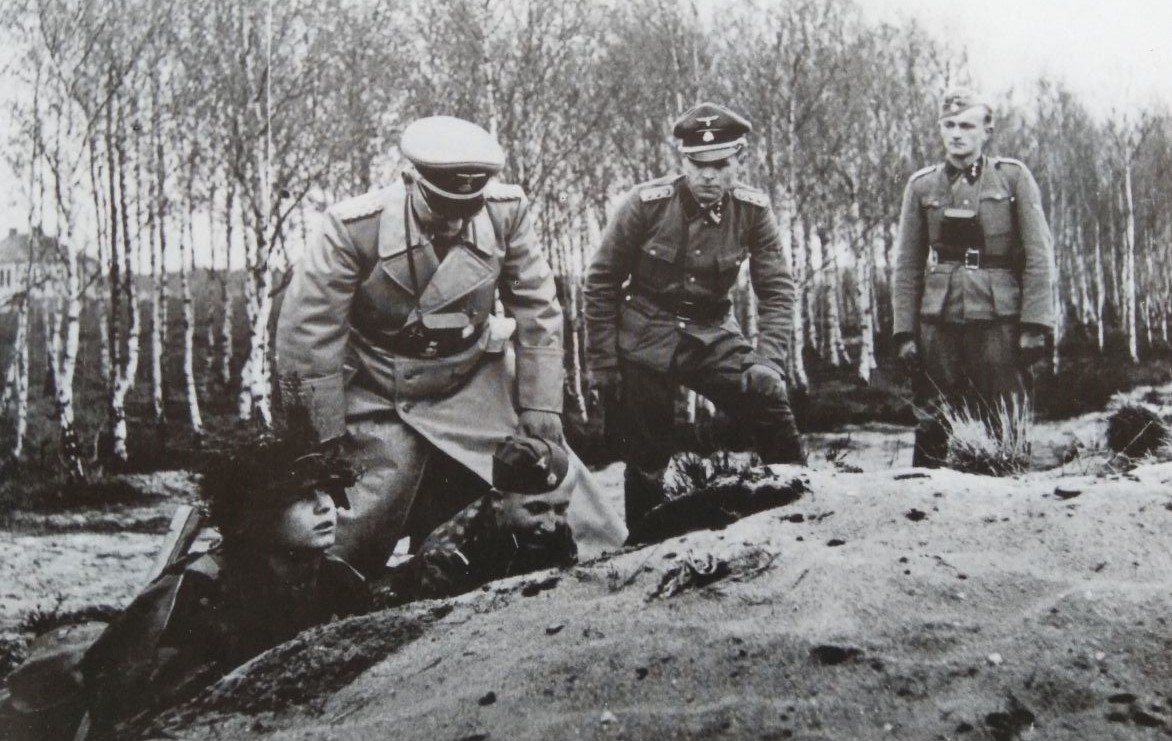
From left to right: Fritz Freitag, Mykhailo Brygider, Liubomyr Ortynskyi. Neuhammer training camp, May 1944

Ortynskyi was born on 7 June 1919 in the village of Mykhailevychi, which is today located in the Drohobych urban hromada of Ukraine's Lviv Oblast.

He finished his schooling in the city of Stryi and continued his studied in the department of journalism at Warsaw University.

He was a member of the Organization of Ukrainian Nationalists. He served as a delegate to a secret student congress in Lviv in March 1939, for which he was arrested by the Polish authorities. He was released at the beginning of World War II.

Starting in January 1941, he studied at the department of law and political science at Vienna University.

He served as an organizer in the OUN-B, Stepan Bandera's faction of the Organization of Ukrainian Nationalists, and was an active participant in the formation of the Ukrainian Nationalist Militias.

He served as a sergeant and the commander of a platoon in the Roland Battalion, and was later the commander of a platoon in the 201st Schutzmannschaft Battalion. According to Ukrainian historian Roman Ponomarenko, after the disbandment of the 201st Battalion, Ortynski was among a group of fifteen of the battalion's officers who did not follow Roman Shukhevych into the underground Ukrainian Insurgent Army but instead went on to form part of the officer corps of the 14th SS Division Galicia.

According to Ukrainian history Andrii Bolianovskyi, in June 1944, Ortynskyi was commander of the 2nd Company (sotnia), 1st Battalion (kurin) of the division's 29th Waffen-Grenadier Regiment. He was wounded in July 1944 during the battle of Brody.

In May 1945, he was taken prisoner by American forces, and was released in 1947. He earned a doctorate in political science from the Ludwig-Maximilians-Universität München.

In 1952, he became the head of the Brotherhood of Former Soldiers of the 1st Ukrainian Division. Between 1952 and 1956 he was the editor-in-chief of the brotherhood's news publication. In 1955, he became an editor of the newspaper Svoboda, and served as its representative in Germany in 1956.

Later in 1956, he moved to the United States and worked as a correspondent for Svoboda covering the United Nations in New York City. He was an overseas member of the Ukrainian Supreme Liberation Council and а secretary at the "Prologue" publishing house.

He died on 22 July 1961 in Hunter, New York.
