= Vasyl Sydor =

Ukrainian Insurgent Army colonel (1910–1949)

- Василь Сидор
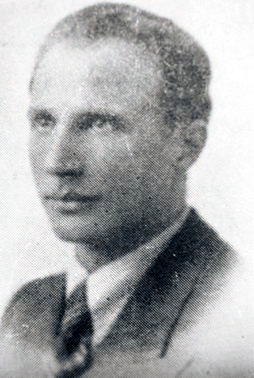
- Born: 24 February 1910; Spasiv, Austria-Hungary (now Ukraine)
- Died: 14 April 1949 (aged 39); Rozhniativ Raion, Ukrainian SSR, Soviet Union (now Ukraine)
- Military career
- Allegiance: Nazi Germany; Ukrainian Insurgent Army
- Rank: Colonel
- Nicknames: Shelest, Vyshyty, Konrad, Zov
- Units: Nachtigall Battalion; Schutzmannschaft Battalion 201; UPA-West
- Conflicts: World War II; Eastern Front; Anti-Soviet resistance by the Ukrainian Insurgent Army

Vasyl Sydor (Ukrainian: Василь Сидор; 24 February 1910 – 14 April 1949) was a colonel of the Ukrainian Insurgent Army (UPA), political activist, soldier of the Nachtigall Battalion, commandant of Schutzmannschaft Battalion 201, vice-commander of UPA and leader of UPA-West for Eastern Galicia during World War II. Sydor was killed in combat with Soviet troops in the Limnytsia river valley.

== Political significance ==
On 1 September 1944, Vasyl Sydor (Shelest) as the UPA commander for Eastern Galicia, issued an order to end "mass anti-Polish actions" within the borders of postwar Poland, thereby focusing on resistance rather than ethnic cleansing. Murders of civilians continued, but only in retaliation. From then on, UPA units began concentrating on attacking those who served with the pro-Soviet forces (although it took several months for the orders to reach individual commanders in the field). In 1945 the Home Army issued a manifesto calling for an end to fighting between Poles and Ukrainians and for cooperation, printed it in 7,500 copies and distributed it in the surrounding villages. At the same time, the leadership of UPA in the region made similar moves aimed at the same goal. After mediation by Catholic and Eastern Orthodox clergy, a meeting was arranged in Puszcza Solska (Solska Forest) between the commanders of both groups. The top commander on the Polish side was Marian Gołębiewski (Ster) and on the Ukrainian side Jurij Lopatynsky (Szejk). On the night of 27 May 1946 the Home Army and UPA conducted their one-and-only joint operation against the communist forces of UB and NKVD in Hrubieszów. They parted their ways the next morning after a successful attack.
