= Yuriy Lopatynsky =

Yuriy Demyanovych Lopatynsky (Ukrainian: Юрій Дем'янович Лопатинський; 4 December 1912 – 16 November 1982), nom de guerre Sheyk and Kalyna, was a Ukrainian activist, soldier and a colonel in the Ukrainian Insurgent Army.

== Biography ==
The son of a Greek Catholic priest, Lopatynsky was born in Ternopil. In 1926 he graduated from Lviv Academic Gymnasium; at the gymnasium, he came into contact with Roman Shukhevych, and became active in the Ukrainian Military Organization (UVO) and the Organisation of Ukrainian Nationalists (OUN). He continued his studies at the University of Lviv, and also in Great Britain, France and Austria.

In 1938–1939, Lopatynsky was a member of the staff of the Carpathian Sich, with the rank of lieutenant. After the split of the OUN in February 1940, he joined the OUN-B, headed by Stepan Bandera, and participated in the 2nd Great Gathering of the OUN-B in Kraków in April 1941. During World War II, Lopatynsky was a senior commander of the collaborationist Nachtigall Battalion. He was arrested by the Gestapo in April 1943, and imprisoned at Sachsenhausen concentration camp. After his release in 1944, Lopatynsky returned to Ukraine as a courier for the Ukrainian Supreme Liberation Council (UHVR) and the OUN-B. In this role, he led armistice negotiations between the Polish Home Army (AK) and the Ukrainian Insurgent Army (UPA) in 1945.

After the end of World War II, Lopatynsky emigrated to the United States. In exile, he continued working for the UHVR, and for the émigré publishing houses Prolog and Litopis UPA. He died in Hunter, New York, in 1982, and was buried in Bound Brook, New Jersey.
