= Bust of Roman Shukhevych =

Statue in Edmonton

- Canada
- The bust vandalised (left) and how it normally appears (right)
- For Roman Shukhevych the Ukrainian ultra-nationalist and Pro-Axis Nazi collaborator of Schutzmannschaft Battalion 201
- Established: 1973
- Location: 53.61299°N 113.49064°W; Ukrainian Youth Association, Edmonton, Alberta

The bust of Roman Shukhevych in Edmonton, Alberta, Canada is a sculpture located near the Ukrainian Youth Association narodny dim of the Ukrainian nationalist and Nazi collaborator Roman Shukhevych, a military leader of the Ukrainian Insurgent Army (UPA), and one of the perpetrators of the Galicia-Volhynia massacres of approximately 100,000 Poles.

== Description and location ==
The bronze bust is located on private property near the Ukrainian Youth Unity Complex in Edmonton. It was partly funded by Canadian taxpayers.

The bust depicts Roman Shukhevych, the Ukrainian ultranationalist and World War II Nazi collaborator. It was erected in 1973 by veterans of the Ukrainian Insurgent Army who fought as part of the Wehrmacht and later emigrated to Canada.

== Critical reception and vandalism ==
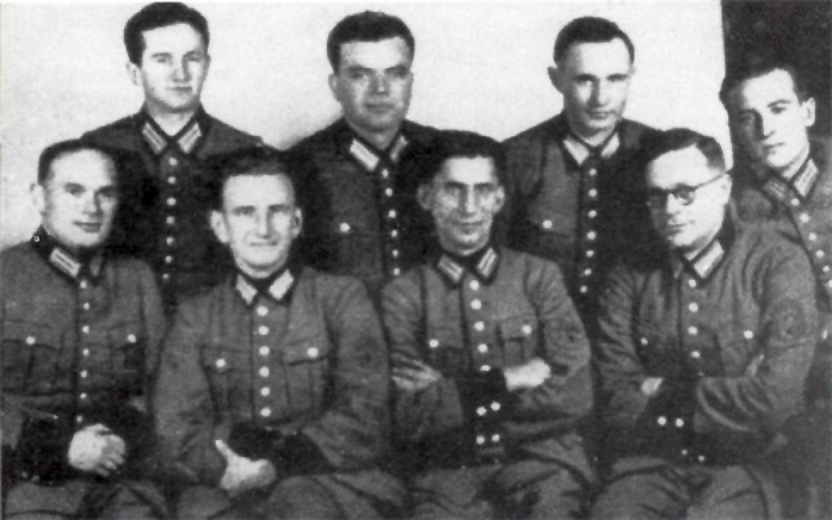
Schutzmannschaft Battalion 201 leaders, with Roman Shukhevych (sitting, second from left), 1942

The Russian Embassy to Canada objected to the presence of the bust in October 2018.

The Friends of Simon Wiesenthal Center for Holocaust Studies called for the removal of the bust in 2021, stating that the bust and another local sculpture honours "Nazi collaborators and war criminals". Jewish group B'nai Brith also called for the bust's removal.

The bust was vandalised with the word "Nazi scum" in 2019. The sculpture was again dubbed with graffiti in 2021 with the words "Actual Nazi" written in red paint. In reaction to the second vandalism, the Ukrainian Youth Association issued as statement, calling the accusations that Ukrainian nationalist fighters during the Second World War were Nazis "Communist propaganda".

In October 2022, journalist and activist Duncan Kinney was charged with graffiti related to vandalism.

== See also ==
- List of Nazi monuments in Canada
- Schutzmannschaft Battalion 201
- Reichskommissariat Ostland
