= Richard Yary =

Ukrainian journalist, politician, and military commander

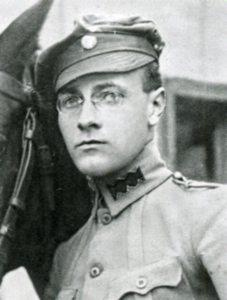
Richard Riko Jary

Richard Franz Marian Yary (also: Riko Yary, Ukrainian: Ріхард Ярий, romanized: Rykhard Yaryi, Polish: Richard Jary, German: Riko Jary; pseudonyms: "Yaryga", "Karpat", "Riko") (1898–1969) was a Ukrainian nationalist journalist, politician and military figure.

Born in Rzeszów, Galicia (then part of Austria-Hungary) in present-day Poland, he became one of the highest functionaries of the Organization of Ukrainian Nationalists (OUN) and a close associate of and advisor to Stepan Bandera.

== Origin ==
According to the Yary family legend the Yarys descended from a Ukrainian Cossack wounded during the Siege of Vienna in 1685.

According to historians O. Kucheruk and Z. Knysh, Yary was of patrilineal Czech and matrilineal Hungarian-Jewish descent(Polish rather than Hungarian (maiden name "Pollack") according to Patrylyak).. Yary's Jewish descent was affirmed by the historian Z. Knysh, but denied by P. Mirchuk who affirmed that Yary was not Jewish, but was denounced as such by his enemies in OUN-M, and Knysh himself was Yary's personal enemy.

=== Family ===
Yary married Olga Rosalie Spielvogel, a Jewish woman from Peremyshliany in 1923.

== In the military ==
In 1912, he completed his studies in the Military Academy in Wiener Neustadt, and commanded a sapper battalion after graduation. In the years of World War I (1914–18), he was an officer in the 9th Dragoons Legion of the Austrian Army. In 1918, he went over to the side of the Ukrainian Galician Army (UHA) and commanded a sniper division and later the 2nd cavalry. In 1919, he fought with the 5th Kherson battalion of the Ukrainian National Republic. In 1920, as part of the battalion he was interned in Czechoslovakia and was held at an internment camp in Uzhhorod.

== In the OUN ==
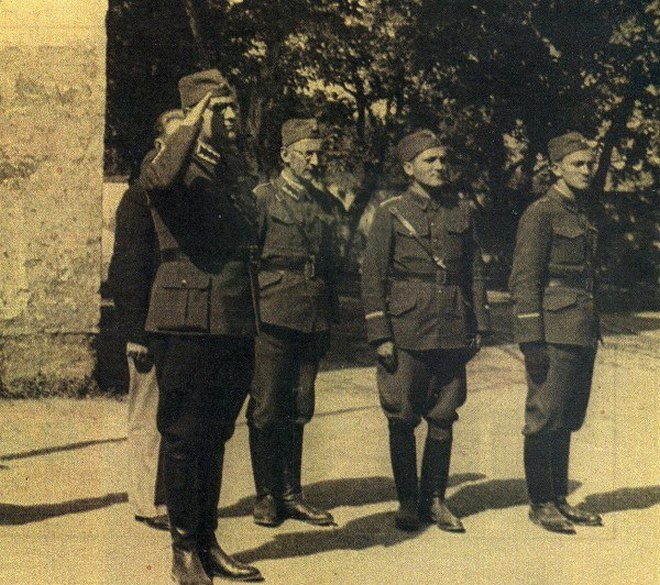
Sergeants of the Roland Battalion, from left to right: Richard Yary, Yevhen Pobihushchyi, platoon commanders Omelian Herman and Liubomyr Ortynskyi.

From 1921-29, he was an active member of the Ukrainian Military Organization (UVO), one of the closest advisers to Yevhen Konovalets. In January 1929, he took part in the First Congress of Ukrainian Nationalists in Vienna, where the formation of the Organisation of Ukrainian Nationalists (OUN) was announced. In 1933 Yary attempted to obtain a post at the Ukrainian Institute founded by hetman Skoropadsky in Berlin (on OUN's behalf), but he could not secure an appointment due to opposition from the Nazi authorities. This attempt led to a smear campaign in the Polish press that accused Yary and Konovalets of being German agents. From 1937-38, he became the liaison officer between Yevhen Konovalets and admiral Wilhelm Canaris of the Abwehr, and directed espionage training courses of the UVO organized by the Abwehr. He became an agent of the Special services, and was an adviser during the discussions between Konovalets and the Japanese Military Attache. During the 1930s Yary was one of the members of the Provid, or leadership council, of the Organization of Ukrainian Nationalists. He was the only member of the Provid to side with Bandera when the organizations split into Bandera and Melnyk factions. According to later claims by members of the Russian Social Democratic party in exile he was also a Soviet agent at the time. Yary's support for Bandera turned some Ukrainians against Bandera because it was considered suspicious that of all the members of the OUN's leadership council, only the one of not fully Ukrainian ethnicity chose to follow Bandera. Yary's influence on Stepan Bandera was instrumental in the division of the OUN into its two factions. After the division, he stayed with the OUN-B (Bandera faction). In November 1940, he arranged contact between Bandera and the Abwehr and set up the Vienna Bureau of the OUN(b). On his initiative, the Nachtigall and Roland Battalion were formed. After the Proclamation of Ukrainian Independence he was given the portfolio of Ambassador to Japan. At the same time, there were reports by the Einsatzgruppe B that Yary and his wife were Jewish, and as such subject to persecution. After the abrogation by the Nazis of the independent Ukrainian State, Yary left the General Government and from 1942 he lived in the Rumanian-occupied Bukovina. In 1943, he was arrested by the Gestapo and was sent to the Sachsenhausen concentration camp.

== After World War II ==
After the war, he returned to his own house in Austria in the Soviet occupational sector. The Soviet occupation forces made no attempt to arrest him, which has led to suspicions that he might have worked for the Soviet intelligence. However, after retiring in Austria, in order to avoid Soviet persecution, he moved to the British sector. After the war, he left political life entirely. According to another source, in the 1950s, Yary became active in OUNb again.

== Sources ==
- (In Ukrainian) О.Кучерук "Рико Ярий - загадка ОУН" Львів, ЛА "ПІРАМІДА" 2005.
- (In Russian) Chuyev, Sergei - Ukrainskyj Legion - Moscow, 2006
- І.К. Патриляк. Військова діяльність ОУН(Б) у 1940—1942 роках. — Університет імені Шевченко \Ін-т історії України НАН України Київ, 2004 p. 261-262
- "Енциклопедія українознавства" - Riko Yary
