= Negrita Jayde =

Canadian television personality and bodybuilder

Negrita Jayde (July 5, 1958 – August 28, 2009) was a Canadian female bodybuilding champion, personal trainer, author, actress and businesswoman. She was the longtime partner and fiancée of Gregory Hines at the time of his death in August 2003. Her books include Supervixen: Secrets for Building a Lean and Sexy Body (1995).

== Death ==
Jayde died aged 51 on August 28, 2009, having been ill with cancer. She is buried next to Hines at St. Volodymyr Ukrainian Cemetery in Oakville, Ontario.
