= The Rise and Fall of Belarusian Nationalism, 1906–1931 =

2014 non-fiction book by Per Anders Rudling

- Author: Per Anders Rudling
- Publisher: University of Pittsburgh Press
- Publication date: 2014
- Pages: 436
- Award: Kulczycki Book Prize in Polish Studies 2015
- ISBN: 978-0822963080

The Rise and Fall of Belarusian Nationalism, 1906–1931 is a 2014 book by Per Anders Rudling about Belarus' relationships with its neighbours, and the drivers and opponents of Belarusian nationalism from 1906 to 1931.

The book attracted both strong praise and criticism and won the Kulczycki Book Prize in Polish Studies in 2015.

== Publication ==
The Rise and Fall of Belarusian Nationalism, 1906-1931 was published by the University of Pittsburgh Press and has 436 pages.

== Synopsis ==
The book follows a chronological order, following interactions between nationalism proponents and their relationship with the major regional state authorities and socialist and nationalist movements. The book states that nationalism was driven by the elite in Belorussia, against the wishes of the Minsk-based communist activists. Rudling writes that while activists still supported a "Belarusian territorial unit" they collaborated with the Lithuanian Soviet state to keep the Second Polish Republic from taking territory. The book states that the Second Polish Republic's leader Jozef Pilsudski actually supported a Belarusian state, but wanted it to be part of a federation with Poland and Ukraine; while Moscow helped create the Belarusian Soviet Socialist Republic.

The book states that Belarusian nationalism was absent amongst the peasant class as a result of poverty and ignorance, rather than repression and censorship. Nationalists tried to recruit via distribution of written materials, but illiteracy was therefore a barrier to their success.

== Critical reception ==
Matthew Pauly of Michigan State University's Department of History called Rudling's analysis remarkable for being the first single book to details the tension between Soviet nationality policy and the consequences for minority groups under Polish rule, especially Belarusians who were view through a lens of being a danger to what Pauly calls "Sovietphilia." David Brandenberger of the University of Richmond described the book as perceptive and stated that it deserved to be read "by anyone interested in the modern trials and tribulations of nation building in eastern Europe and the former republics of the USSR". Simon M. Lewis of the Free University of Berlin called the book a "brilliant study" for casting a "much-needed light on a country largely marginalised from the western scholarship."

Writing in the East/West: Journal of Ukrainian Studies, Polish-American historian Marek Jan Chodakiewicz was deeply critical of the book, which he called "a true believer’s regurgitation of leftist theories of nationalism." Jerzy Borzecki of the University of Toronto described the books' attempts to deal with the topic as "less than successful" but also said the book offered "some valuable insights".

The book won the Kulczycki Book Prize in Polish Studies in 2015.
