= Roland Battalion =

Military unit

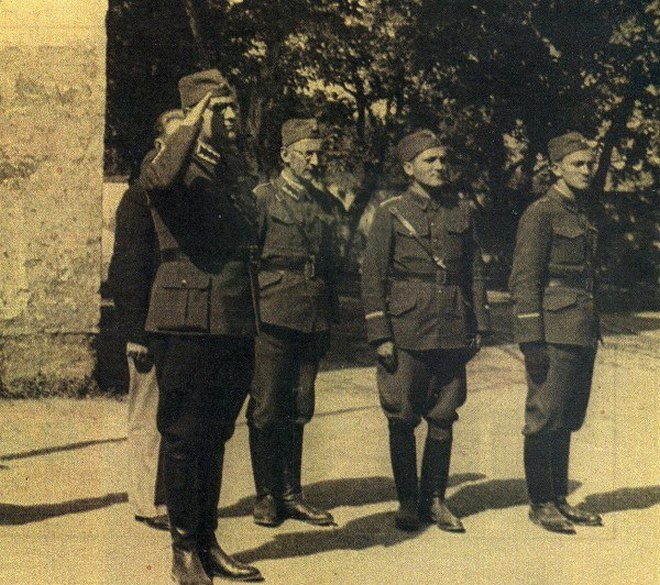
- Leadership of the battalion, from left to right: Sergeants Richard Yary, Yevhen Pobihushchyi; platoon commanders Omelian Herman and Liubomyr Ortynskyi
- Active: 25 February to late October 1941
- Country: Nazi Germany
- Branch: Abwehr
- Size: 240 to 650
- Engagements: World War II; Operation Barbarossa

Commanders
- Notable commanders: Yevhen Pobihushchyi-Ren

The Roland Battalion (German: Battalion Ukrainische Gruppe Roland), officially known as Special Group Roland, was a subunit under the command of the German military intelligence agency's (the Abwehr's) special operations unit Lehrregiment "Brandenburg" z.b.V. 800 in 1941. It and the Nachtigall Battalion were the two military units set up following the 25 February 1941 decision by the head of the Abwehr, Admiral Wilhelm Franz Canaris, who sanctioned the recruitment of a "Ukrainian Legion" (Ukrainian: Дружини українських націоналістів, lit. 'Legions of Ukrainian Nationalists') under German command. The Roland Battalion, formed in mid-April 1941, 350-strong and initially based in the Ostmark (present-day Austria), was composed primarily of volunteers of Ukrainian ethnicity living in German-occupied Poland and directed to the unit by orders the Organization of Ukrainian Nationalists (OUN) under Stepan Bandera.

In Germany, in November 1941 the Ukrainian personnel of the Legion (Nachtigall and Roland battalions) was reorganized into Schutzmannschaft Battalion 201. It numbered 650 persons, who served for a year in the occupied Byelorussian Soviet Socialist Republic (present-day Belarus) before disbanding.

== Formation ==
Prior to Operation Barbarossa, both Stepan Bandera and Andriy Melnyk, who led rival branches of the Organization of Ukrainian Nationalists actively cooperated with Nazi Germany. According to the National Academy of Sciences of Ukraine and other sources, Bandera held meetings with the heads of Germany's intelligence regarding the formation of the Nachtigall and Roland Battalions. On 25 February 1941, the head of the Abwehr, Wilhelm Franz Canaris, sanctioned the creation of the "Ukrainian Legion" under German command. The unit would have had 800 persons. Roman Shukhevych became a commander of the Legion from the OUN-B side. OUN expected that the unit would become the core of the future Ukrainian army. In the spring the OUN received 2.5 million marks for subversive activities against the USSR. In the spring of 1941 the Legion was reorganized into 2 units. One of the units became known as Nachtigall Battalion, a second became the Roland Battalion, and the remainder was immediately dispatched into Soviet Union to sabotage the Red Army's rear.

The battalion was set up by the Abwehr and organized by Richard Yary of the OUN(b) in March 1941, prior to the German invasion of the Soviet Union. Approximately 350 Bandera's OUN followers were trained at the Abwehr training centre at Seibersdorf under the command of the OUN member and former Polish Army major Yevhen Pobihushchyi.

In comparison to Nachtigall, which used the ordinary Wehrmacht uniform, the Roland Battalion was outfitted in the Czech uniform with yellow armband with text "Im Dienst der Deutschen Wehrmacht" (In the service of the German Wehrmacht). They were given Austrian helmets from World War I. The battalion had arms consisting of 2 Czech light machine guns and German light weaponry.

== Operational history ==
The Roland Battalion moved to the Romanian-Soviet border by 15 June 1941 and was placed under command of the German Army Group South. On 27 June 1941, they were placed under command of the German 11th Army with the task of moving in the Campulung Moldovenesc-Gura Humorului-Suceava-Botoşani direction, with the tasks of clearing road and transportation corridors, organizing groups of Ukrainian home guards, guarding transportation of food, helping with the evacuation of prisoners of war, and guarding strategic objectives.

On 30 June 1941, Abwehr received an order to prevent the unit from taking any military action, and it was held at Frumusola. On 24 July the Roland Battalion was transferred to the command of the 54th Army Corps with the task of guarding roads east of the Dniester River. At that time the battalion had 9 officers and 260 soldiers. In time, the battalion was planned to be topped up with another 150 volunteers from the occupied areas and spend some time near Yassy.

From 28 July, the battalion was directed to the front line, crossing the Dniester at Dubossari, and headed to Odesa.

== Dissolution ==
On 10 August 1941, the command of the 11th Army received a telegram from Abwehr, saying, "After consultations with the Reichsminister of the occupied territories of the East, the Roland organization should be excluded from campaign because of political reasons". On 14 August, the battalion was recalled. 50 of the Roland personnel remained as translators at the established occupational administrations of the Reich. They were restricted, however, from political activity, and after 30 days they were all relieved of their duties. The rest of the battalion returned to Focşani on 26 August 1941. Their weapons were taken from them while they traveled; they were transported to the town of Mayerling near Vienna and their weapons returned to them.

By 21 October 1941, the unit was transferred to Neuhammer where it was merged with the Nachtigall Battalion to form Schutzmannschaft Battalion 201.
