= Sergei Chuyev =

Russian historian

Sergei Chuev
- Сергей Геннадьевич Чуев
- Born: Sergei Gennad'evich Chuev; 1971 (age 54–55); Moscow
- Citizenship: Soviet Union → Russia
- Education: Moscow State Institute of Culture
- Scientific career
- Fields: History
- Website: http://www.roa.ru/chuew.html

Sergei Chuev (Russian: Серге́й Генна́дьевич Чуев; born 1971 in Moscow) is a Russian historian specializing in World War II.

== Biography ==
In 1996 he graduated from the Moscow State Institute of Culture in the specialty "Bibliography and Library Science", in 2001 - University of the Russian Academy of Education (ru:Университет Российского инновационного образования) majoring in "Civil Law. Jurisprudence". From 1993 to 2003 he served in the Federal Customs Service of Russia. Major of the Customs Service (retired). Author of six books (co-author of two of them) including Special forces of the Third Reich in two volumes (Russian: Спецслужбы Третьего Рейха), devoted to activities of the German Abwehr intelligence against the Soviet Union. Second volume describes history of the Reich Security Main Office (RSHA) in German-occupied territories including system of camps and the training of collaborationist Russian Liberation Army. The book details the recruitment from among the Soviet citizens, and the formation of parallel Kaminski Brigade, as well as the SS Division Galicia, Belarusian Home Defence, the Turkestan Legion, and pro-Nazi sabotage units as well as police.

In his book published in 2006, titled Russian: Украинский легион, Chuev described the work of Ukrainian nationalists against the Russian Empire. The first evidence of the genocide of the Russian people in Galicia and the planned destruction of all Russian in Western Ukraine in the first decades of the 20th century are presented. A special place in the book is given to the history of Ukrainian collaboration with Nazi Germany including war crimes committed by the Ukrainian nationalists against the Russians in Western Ukraine. Special focus was given to the Ukrainian Insurgent Army (UPA) along with the 14th Waffen Grenadier Division of the SS (1st Galician) and the Ukrainian National Army active in the Soviet Union. Chuyev relied on documents stored in the KGB archives including German administration correspondence, testimonies of participants, and rare photography.

== Books by Sergei Chuev ==
- Чуев С. Г. (2004). Проклятые солдаты. Предатели на стороне III рейха (in Russian). Москва: Эксмо. ISBN 5-699-05970-9.
- Чуев С. Г. (2006). Власовцы - пасынки Третьего Рейха (in Russian). Москва: Эксмо. p. 640. ISBN 5-699-14989-9.
- Чуев С. Г. (2003). Спецслужбы Третьего Рейха: Книга I (in Russian). Москва, Санкт-Петербург: Нева, ОЛМА-ПРЕСС Образование. p. 383. ISBN 5-7654-2826-6.
- Чуев С. Г. (2003). Спецслужбы Третьего Рейха: Книга II (in Russian). Москва, Санкт-Петербург: Нева, ОЛМА-ПРЕСС Образование. p. 448. ISBN 5-7654-2831-2.
- Чуев С. Г. (2006). Украинский легион. На стороне Третьего рейха (in Russian). Москва: Яуза. p. 560. ISBN 5-87849-210-5. Archived from the original on 2015-04-19.
- Мадер Ю.; Прохоров Д.; Чернявский В.; Чуев С. Г. (2003). Диверсанты Третьего Рейха. Командос (in Russian). Москва: Эксмо, Яуза. p. 416. ISBN 5-699-03352-1.
- Мадер Ю.; Чернявский В.; Чуев С. Г. (2013). Отто Скорцени – диверсант No. 1. Взлет и падение гитлеровского спецназа. Спецназ Гитлера (in Russian). Москва: Яуза-Пресс. p. 328. ISBN 978-5-9955-0498-6.

== Journals ==
- Чуев С. (2003). "Атаман Тарас Бульба-Боровец и "Полесская Сечь"". Обозреватель (in Russian). 3 (158). ISSN 2074-2975. Archived from the original on 2017-03-26.
- Чуев С. Г. (2003). ""Бригада Родионова, получившая название 1-й антифашистской партизанской бригады..."". Военно-Исторический Журнал (in Russian) (12): 20–23. ISSN 0321-0626.
- Чуев С. (2002). "Кавказ 1941-1945. Война в тылу". Обозреватель (in Russian). 2 (145). ISSN 2074-2975. Archived from the original on 2014-05-19.
- Чуев С. (2002). "Татарский коллаборационизм в Великой Отечественной войне". Обозреватель (in Russian) (5—6(148—149)). ISSN 2074-2975. Archived from the original on 2016-03-04.

== Selected periodicals ==
- Чуев С. Г. (2002). ""Бригада "Дружина"—единожды предав..."". Военно-Исторический Архив (in Russian). Vol. 6, no. 30. pp. 134–145.
- Чуев С. Г. (2002). "Гемфуртские сироты или неизвестное "чудо-оружие" Третьего Рейха". Солдат Удачи (in Russian). Vol. 4, no. 91. pp. 29–31. ISSN 0201-7121.
- Чуев С. Г. (2002). "Бранденбург-800". Солдат Удачи (in Russian). Vol. 9, no. 96. pp. 23–25. ISSN 0201-7121.
- Чуев С. (July 2002). "Казачьи формирования немецких спецслужб". Станица (in Russian). Vol. 7, no. 38. Archived from the original on 2015-10-06.
- Чуев С. (2003). "Предприятие "Цеппелин" против СССР". Военно-Исторический Архив (in Russian). No. 2.
- Чуев С. (2002). "Разведывательные и диверсионные школы Абвера". Военно-Исторический Архив (in Russian). No. 8–10.
- Чуев С. (2003). "Спецназ Гитлера. Сухопутные силы специального назначения Третьего Рейха. Соединение "Бранденбург-800", "Истребительное соединение войск СС"". Военно-Исторический Архив (in Russian). No. 6.

== Notes and references ==
- Worldcat.org: OCLC. Books by Sergei Chuyev.
