= Postolivka, Ternopil Oblast =

Rural locality in Ternopil Oblast, Ukraine

Postolivka Постолівка
- Location in Ternopil Oblast
- Coordinates: 49°12′14″N 26°5′59″E
- Country: Ukraine
- Oblast: Ternopil Oblast
- Raion: Chortkiv Raion
- Hromada: Husiatyn settlement hromada
- Time zone: UTC+2 (EET)
  - Summer (DST): UTC+3 (EEST)
- Postal code: 48236

Postolivka (Ukrainian: Постолівка) is a village in Husiatyn settlement hromada, Chortkiv Raion, Ternopil Oblast, Ukraine.

== History ==
The first written mention is from 1546.

After the liquidation of the Husiatyn Raion on 19 July 2020, the village became part of the Chortkiv Raion.

== Religion ==
- Church of the Nativity of John the Baptist (1844, brick)
- Roman Catholic Church of the Holy Apostles Peter and Paul (1890, brick)

== Sources ==
- (in Ukrainian) Бігус М., Уніят, В., Постолівка // Ternopil Encyclopedic Dictionary: in 4 v. / editorial board: H. Yavorskyi and other, Ternopil: "Zbruch", 2008, V. 3: П—Я, S. 122. — ISBN 978-966-528-279-2.
- "Postołówka". Geographical Dictionary of the Kingdom of Poland (in Polish). 8. Warszawa: Kasa im. Józefa Mianowskiego. 1887. p. 851.
