= Schutzmannschaft Battalion 201 =

Military unit

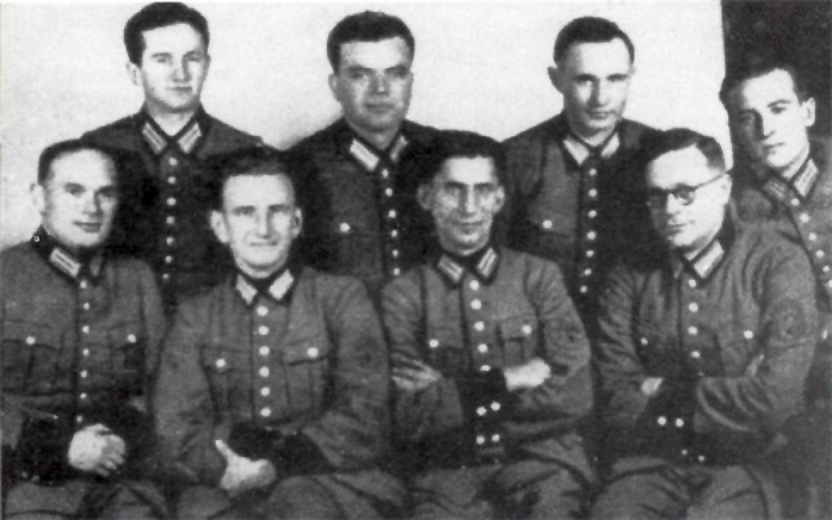
- Schutzmannschaft Battalion 201 leaders, with Roman Shukhevych (sitting, second from left), 1942
- Active: late October 1941 – December 1942
- Country: Reichskommissariat Ostland
- Branch: Sicherheitspolizei
- Type: Battalion
- Role: Security police
- Size: 650
- Engagements: Anti-partisan operations in Belarus; Operation Blitz; Operation Luchs; Operation Panther (1942); Holocaust in Belarus

Commanders
- Notable commanders: Yevhen Pobihushchyi-Ren; Roman Shukhevych (deputy commander)

The Schutzmannschaft Battalion 201 was a World War II Ukrainian Schutzmannschaft auxiliary police battalion formed by Nazi Germany on 21 October 1941, predominantly from the soldiers of Ukrainian Nachtigall Battalion dissolved two months prior and the Roland Battalion. The battalion was part of the Army Group Centre that operated in Belarus.

Nachtigall was an intelligence and diversion group of Abwehr, but according to other historians a Security Police unit, composed almost exclusively from members of the OUN-B, who were transported from Vinnytsia to Neuhammer on 13 August 1941 and disarmed at gunpoint due to political disagreement with the German leadership. Historian Frank Golczewski says the Battalion fought against partisans and participated in the Jewish genocide in Belarus. According to historian John-Paul Himka no one has specifically studied the activities of Schuma 201 in relation to the destruction of the Jewish population. But we do know – wrote Himka – that the Germans routinely used the Schuma battalions in Belarus both to fight partisans and to murder Jews.

Battalion 201 numbered 650 persons, most of whom belonged to Stepan Bandera’s wing of the Organization of Ukrainian Nationalists. It served for a year in Belarus before being disbanded. Roman Shukhevych, the supreme commander of the UPA from 1943 to 1950 was an officer of the battalion.

Many of its members, especially the commanding officers, would later be recruited into the Ukrainian Insurgent Army.

== Formation and training ==
This formation was formed on 21 October 1941 with 4 companies. Their commanders were:

- 1st – Roman Shukevych (and deputy commander of the battalion)
- 2nd – Mykhailo Brygider
- 3rd – Vasyl Sydor
- 4th – Pavlyk

The formal commander of the battalion became former Polish Army major and Roland Battalion commander Yevhen Pobihushchyi, however, the SD liaisons officer Wilhelm Mocha became the actual commander of the battalion. According to the memoirs of Pobihushchyi, by the time of the battalion's formation most of the Ukrainian soldiers considered both Germany and the Soviet Union to be enemies of Ukraine, but considered the Soviets to be the greater enemies to be fought first. During the training period there were tensions between the German command and the Ukrainians. They departed for Belarus on 19 and 22 March 1942. The battalion were given German police uniforms.

== Service in Belarus ==
On 16 March 1942, the battalion traveled east and on 19 March, its first subunits arrived in Belarus where it served in the triangle between Mahiliou-Vitsebsk-Lepel. The battalion wasn't concentrated in one place, but was spread out in order to guard various strategic areas. For example, one group guarded large ammunition and weapon warehouses while other groups were stationed in various Belarusian villages. They guarded bridges, protected the German administration, and hunted in the woods for Soviet partisan bases. The conflicts between Germans and Ukrainians, evident during the training, continued during these operations; relations between the German and Ukrainian officers were poor.

The stay in Belarus provided the Ukrainian soldiers not only with to opportunity to gain experience in partisan warfare but also provided insight into the German tactics of fighting against partisans.

== Participation in the Holocaust ==
German-Polish historian Professor Frank Golczewski (University of Hamburg) describes the activities of the Schutzmannschaft Battalion 201 in Belarus as "fighting partisans and killing Jews". John-Paul Himka, a specialist in Ukrainian history during World War II, and Ivan Katchanovski of the University of Ottawa both note that while no one has studied the specific activities of the 201st battalion from this perspective, it is known that Schuma battalions such as the 201 in Belarus were used to fight partisans and murder Jews, that (according to Katchanovsky) there was a strong likelihood that the 201 Battalion was involved in genocide of Jews and Belarusians, and that this topic is worthy of more investigation, although it hasn't been studied in depth.

David R. Marples notes that Wiktor Poliszczuk claimed that Schutzmannschaft Battalion 201 in Belarus completed brutal pacification of Belarusian villages, and the men had experience with elimination of the Jewish population; however he also describes Poliszczuk's book as a polemic, written from the Soviet perspective, and one-sided.

According to OUN's own records, more than 2,000 Soviet partisans were killed by battalion personnel during its 9-month stay in Belarus. Historian Per Anders Rudling noted, that the so-called "partisans" were nearly synonymous with Jews, as according to Arthur Nebe, the leader of Einsatzgruppe B,

"The view that “The Jews are without exception identical with the concept of partisan” was a key assumption of the architects of the German counter-insurgency campaigns".

== Disbanding ==
On 1 December 1942 after the expiration of their contracts, the members of the Legion refused to promulgate it. As the result, the 201st Battalion personnel was taken into detention and relocated to Lvov.

The German command suggested to all those who had been in the Battalion to gather in Lublin to form a new unit, however, none of the Ukrainians signed up, and very few reported to Lublin. Some were arrested and placed in the jail on Lonsky street, and Roman Shukhevych escaped and went into hiding.

According to Ukrainian historian Roman Ponomarenko, a group of fifteen of the battalion's officers, including Pobihushchyi, Brygider, and Omelian Herman went on to form part of the officer corps of the 14th SS Division Galicia instead of following Shukhevych into the underground Ukrainian Insurgent Army.
