= Per Anders Rudling =

Swedish-American historian (born 1974)

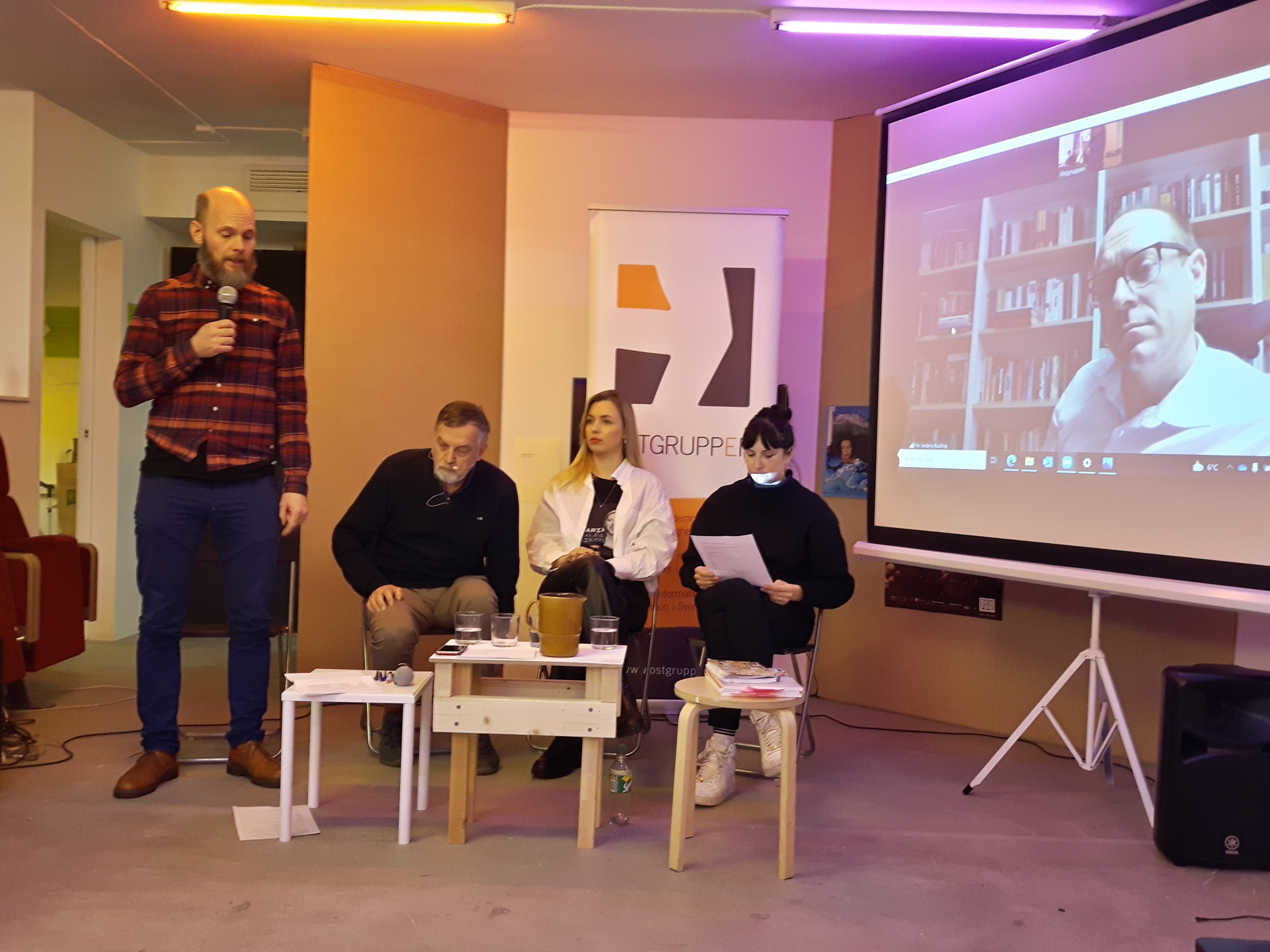
- Rudling (on the video screen, right)
- Born: 11 April 1974 (age 52); Karlstad, Sweden
- Occupation: Academic

Academic background
- Education: Uppsala University; San Diego State University; University of Alberta

Academic work
- Institutions: Lund University
- Notable works: The Rise and Fall of Belarusian Nationalism, 1906-1931

Per Anders Rudling (born 11 April 1974) is a Swedish-American historian and an associate professor in the Department of History at Lund University (Sweden). He specializes in the areas of nationalism and memory politics in Eastern Europe.

== Education ==
Rudling holds a Master of Arts degree in Russian from Uppsala University (1998), a Master of Arts degree in history from San Diego State University (US) (2003), a Ph.D. in history from the University of Alberta (Canada) (2009), and completed a post-doc at the University of Greifswald, Germany.

== Career ==
2013 Rudling was appointed as Associated Professor in History by Lund University.

In summer semester 2015, Rudling was Visiting Professor at the Institute of Eastern European History at University of Vienna. From December 2015 to June 2019, he was Visiting Senior Fellow in History at the National University of Singapore. From July 2019 to June 2021, he was Research Associate at the Center for Baltic and East European Studies at Södertörn University in Huddinge with Focus on Belarus.

In 2019, Rudling received a five-year scholarship from the Knut and Alice Wallenberg Foundation. The Wallenberg scholarship is considered the highest and most prestigious academic award for young researchers in Sweden. The scholarship, worth around 160,000 euros a year, will be used to study Ukrainian "long-distance nationalism" of the Ukrainian diaspora in Canada, focusing on the formation of a "collective memory" through the Great Famine of 1932-33 and the anti-Soviet resistance in the immediate post-war years.

== Research ==
Rudling is the author of The Rise and Fall of Belarusian Nationalism, 1906-1931, published by the University of Pittsburgh Press, devoted to the subject of present-day Belarusian nationalism from its origins until the 1930s. The book won the Kulczycki Book Prize in Polish Studies in 2015.

== OUN Controversy ==
Rudling gained international attention in October 2012 when a group of Ukrainian organizations in Canada delivered a signed protest to his employer, accusing him of betraying his own university's principles. The letter was a response to Rudling's public criticism of what he considered a glorification of OUN-B, UPA, Stepan Bandera, and Roman Shukhevych by fellow historian Ruslan Zabily from Ukraine, during his lecture tour in Canada and the United States. Rudling delivered a communiqué from Lund to concerned universities, pointing out to the role of OUN-B in the Holocaust in Ukraine and the involvement of UPA in the massacres of Poles in Volhynia and Eastern Galicia. He also wrote about Bandera's antisemitism and political violence during World War II, which led to ethnic cleansing not only of Poles and Jews but also of Ukrainians themselves. In response to the Canadian-Ukrainian complaint about Rudling, a large group of academic researchers published an open letter in support of him.

== Awards ==
- Kulczycki Book Prize in Polish Studies (2015)

== His books ==
- Tarnished Heroes: The Organization of Ukrainian Nationalists in the Memory Politics of Post-Soviet Ukraine. Hannover: ibidim. 2014. ISBN 978-3-8382-0999-9.
- The Rise and Fall of Belarusian Nationalism, 1906–1931, University of Pittsburgh Press, Pittsburgh 2015, ISBN 978-0-8229-6308-0
- The OUN, the UPA and the Holocaust: A Study in the Manufacturing of Historical Myths. 2011. ISSN 0889-275X.
