= Nachtigall Battalion =

German-controlled Ukrainian military unit in World War II

- Active: February 25 – late October 1941
- Country: Nazi Germany; Reichskommissariat Ukraine
- Branch: Abwehr
- Role: Special Forces
- Size: 360 to 400
- Engagements: Operation Barbarossa

Commanders
- Notable commanders: Roman Shukhevych, Theodor Oberländer

The Nachtigall Battalion (English: Nightingale Battalion), also known as the Ukrainian Nightingale Battalion Group (German: Bataillon Ukrainische Gruppe Nachtigall), or officially as Special Group Nachtigall (German: Sondergruppe 'Nachtigall') was a subunit under command of the German Abwehr special-operations unit Lehrregiment "Brandenburg" z.b.V. 800 in 1941. Along with the Roland Battalion it was one of two military units which originated on February 25, 1941, when the head of the Abwehr, Admiral Wilhelm Franz Canaris, sanctioned the formation of a "Ukrainian Legion" under German command. The Legion was composed of volunteer Ukrainians many of whom were members or supporters of Organization of Ukrainian Nationalists (OUN-B). The Battalion participated in early stages of Operation Barbarossa (the Axis invasion of the Soviet Union) with Army Group South between June and August 1941.

After returning to Germany, in November 1941 the Ukrainian members of the Legion were reorganized into the 201st Schutzmannschaft Battalion. It numbered 650 persons who served for one year in Byelorussia (present-day Belarus) before disbanding. Many of its members, especially the commanding officers, went on to join the Ukrainian Insurgent Army (founded in 1942), and 14 of its members joined SS Division Galicia in spring 1943.

== Formation and training ==
Prior to Operation Barbarossa, Stepan Bandera's Organization of Ukrainian Nationalists (OUN) sought contact with Nazi Germany and in fact received its training there in order to use this as an opportunity to restore independence of Ukraine.

According to the National Academy of Sciences of Ukraine and other sources, OUN-B leader Stepan Bandera held meetings with the heads of Germany's intelligence, regarding the formation of the Nachtigall and Roland Battalions. February 25, 1941, Wilhelm Canaris, head of the Abwehr, sanctioned the creation of the "Ukrainian Legion" under German command. The unit would have had 800 persons. Roman Shukhevych became a commander of the Legion from the OUN-B side. OUN expected that the unit would become the core of the future Ukrainian army. In the spring the OUN received 2.5 million marks for subversive activities against the USSR. In the spring of 1941 the Legion was reorganized into two units. One of the units became known as Nachtigall Battalion, a second became the Roland Battalion.

Training for Nachtigall took place in Neuhammer near Schlessig. On the Ukrainian side, the commander was Roman Shukhevych and on the German, Theodor Oberländer. (Oberländer was later to become Federal Minister for Displaced Persons, Refugees and War Victims in the Federal Republic of Germany.) Ex-Brandenburger Oberleutnant Dr. Hans-Albrecht Herzner (de) was placed in military command of the Battalion.

The Nachtigall unit was outfitted in the standard Wehrmacht uniforms. Before entering Lviv, they placed blue and yellow ribbons on their shoulders.

== War with the Soviet Union ==
Four days before the attack on the Soviet Union, the Battalion was moved to the border. On the night of June 23–24, 1941, the Battalion crossed the border near Przemyśl while traveling in the direction of Lviv. The Nachtigall Battalion traveled along with a Panzer-Jaeger Division and some tank units went along through Radymno-Lviv-Ternopil-Proskuriv-Vinnytsia path. As part of the 1st Brandenburg Battalion, the first soldiers of the Nachtigall Battalion entered Lviv on June 29. The battalion took up guard of strategic objects, the most important of which was the radio station on the Vysoky Zamok Hill in the centre of Lviv. From the radio station, the proclamation of the Act of Ukrainian Independence was made.

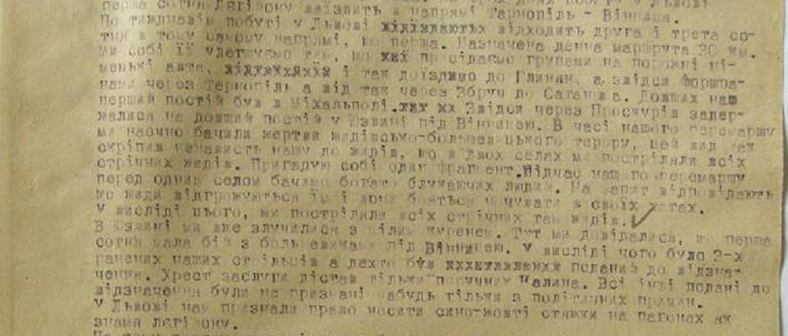
Excerpt from a report by a member of the battalion about shooting "all Jews which were met" in Vinnytsia region

The Nachtigall servicemen participated in and organized the Declaration of Ukrainian Independence proclaimed by Yaroslav Stetsko on June 30. Battalion chaplain Ivan Hrynokh made a speech after declaration meeting ended. The German administration did not support these activities but did not act harshly against organizers until mid-September 1941.

The first company of the Nachtigall Battalion left Lviv with the Brandenburgers on July 7 in the direction of Zolochiv. The remainder of the unit joined later during their eastward march towards Zolochiv, Ternopil and Vinnytsia. The unit participated in action against Stalin Line where some of its members were awarded by the Germans. During the march at three villages of the Vinnytsia region "all Jews which were met" were shot.

It is estimated that in June–July 1941 over 4,000 Jews were murdered in pogroms in Lviv and other cities in Western Ukraine. There is controversy regarding the extent and scope of the participation of the Nachtigall Battalion and Roman Shukhevych in these atrocities, as well as in the Massacre of Lviv professors. The Polish historical consensus is that the battalion, as a unit, participated directly in the pogrom, giving and receiving assistance from the Nazis. American Historian John Armstrong questions this consensus, asserting that the Ukrainian perpetrators present were likely interpreters, and that the allegations of the Battalion's involvement were politically motivated. Conversely, historian Alexander Dallin described their participation as "obvious" to the German occupiers, who observed the "considerable initiative" of Bandera's followers, including members of the battalion. Roman Waschuk, a Canadian-Ukrainian scholar at the University of Alberta, dismisses allegations of Nachtigall's participation as "Soviet propaganda." According to Bernard Wasserstein, members of the Nachtigall Battalion were among those who participated in the pogroms of Lviv against the Jewish population. According to Per Anders Rudling, members of Nachtigall Battalion was directly implicated in the Lviv pogrom, but their presence as an organized unit is unclear. Survivors observed Ukrainians in Wehrmacht uniforms participating in the pogroms. He adds that they were but one of the perpetrators, and played a minor part of the anti-Jewish violence carried out that day.

A diarist member of the Nachtigall Battalion travelled from L'viv to Vinnytsia in July 1941 and noted that "During our march, we saw with our own eyes the victims of the Jewish–Bolshevik terror, which strengthened our hatred of the Jews, and so, after that, we shot all the Jews we encountered in 2 villages".

The German refusal to accept the OUN(b)'s June 30 proclamation of Ukrainian independence in L'viv led to a conflict with the leadership of the Nachtigall battalion and a change of the Nachtigall battalion direction. On August 13, 1941, it was disarmed and ordered to return from Vinnytsia to Neuhammer in Silesia, from which its members were transported to Frankfurt an der Oder. It was later transformed together with Roland battalion into the 201st Schutzmannschaft Battalion.

== Assessment ==
Russian historian Sergei Chuyev states that despite the ending, OUN achieved its ultimate goals – 600 members of their organization had received military training and had battle experience and these men took positions as instructors and commanders in the structure of the newly formed Ukrainian Insurgent Army.

Stepan Bandera wrote: "The end of OUN was such: the revolutionary columns were commanded by Roman Shukhevych with a small party of officers who had not only undergone military training but had come to a clear understanding of military tactics. Most importantly, they brought with them - an understanding of organization, strategies and tactics of partisan fighting, and the German method of dealing with partisan groups. This knowledge was very useful in the formation and activities of the UPA and in its future conflicts.

During its short history, the Nachtigall Battalion had 39 casualties and 40 wounded soldiers.

== Controversy ==
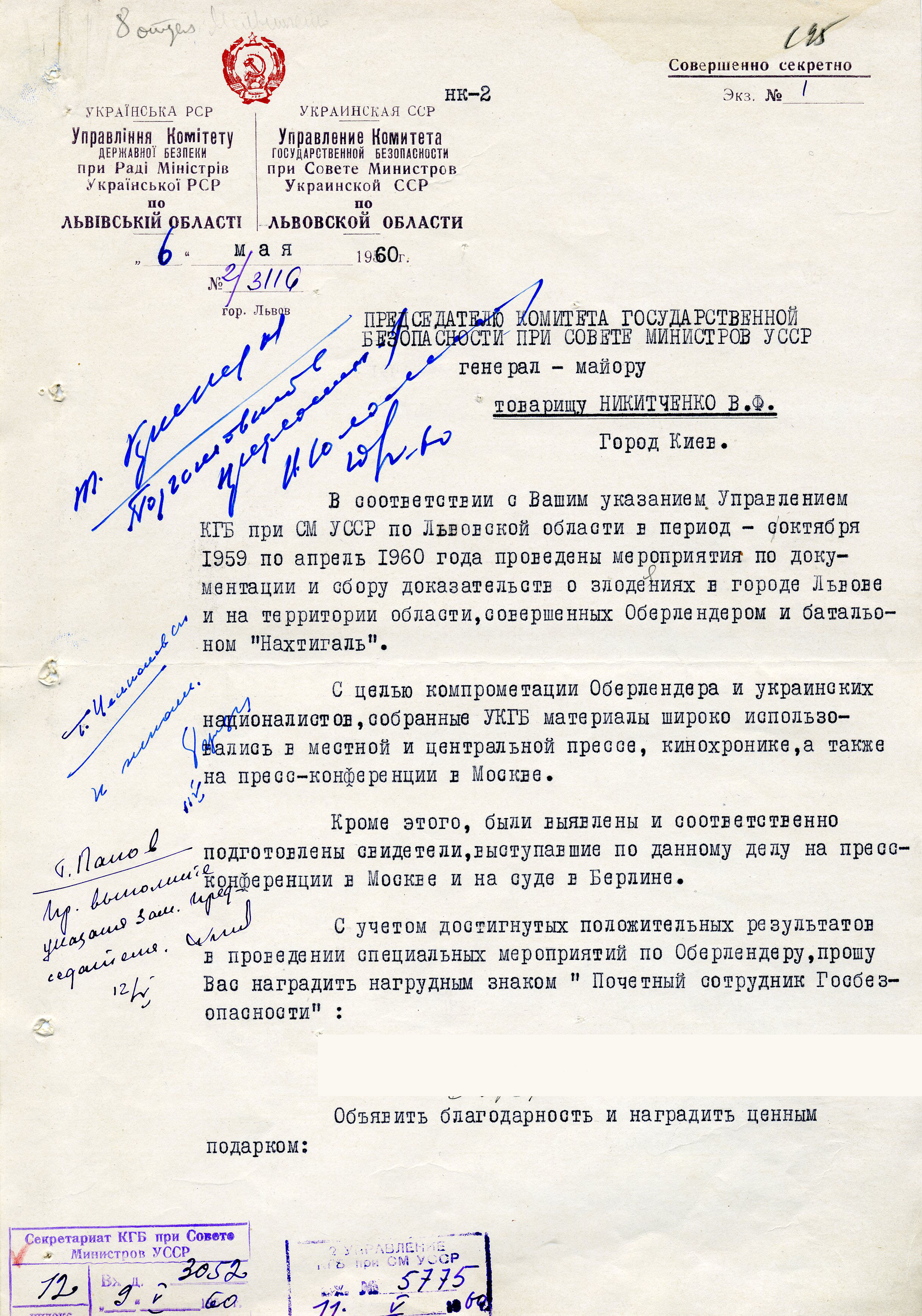
KGB document on action against Theodor Oberländer and Ukrainian Nachtigall (1959).

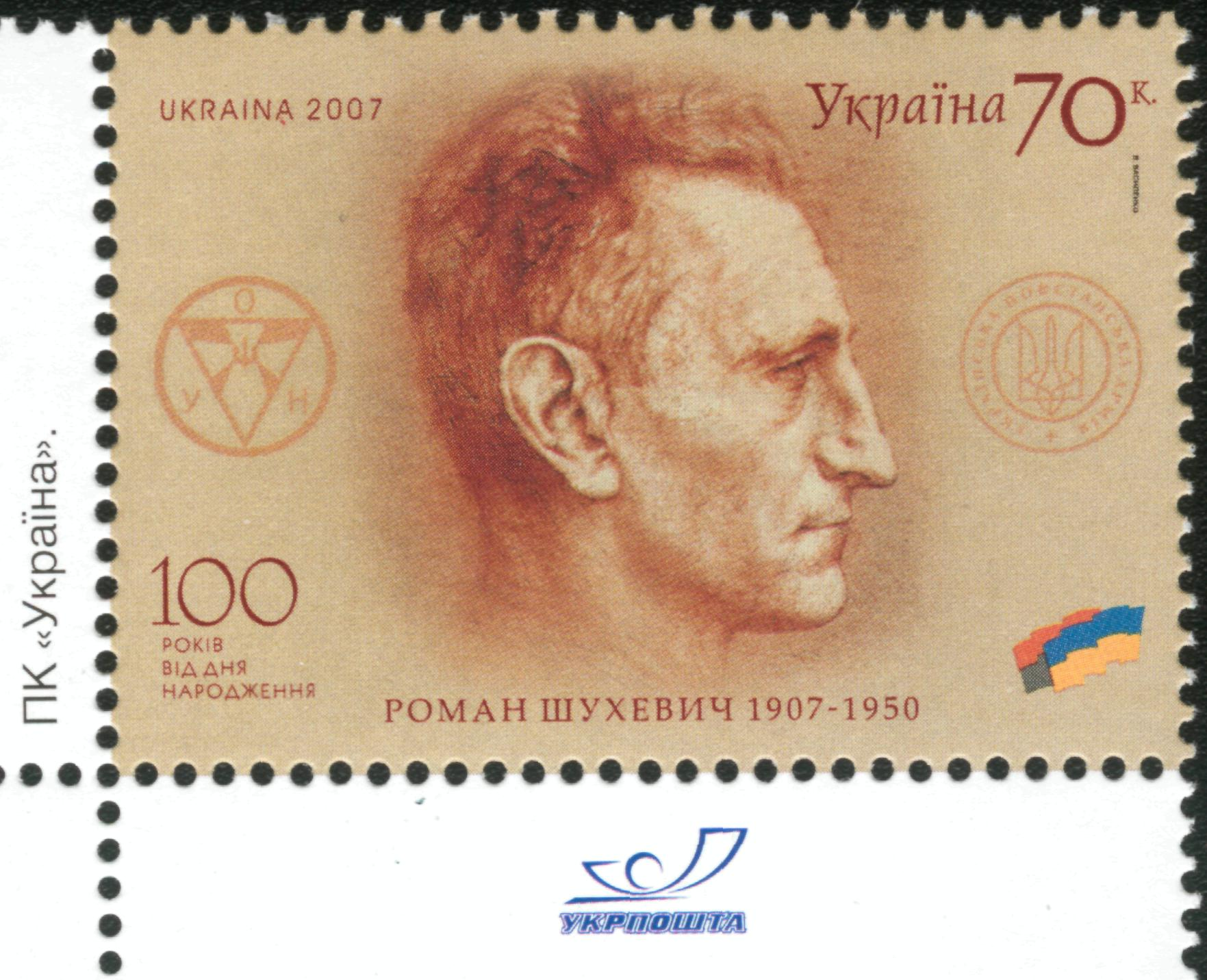
A Ukrainian postage stamp (2007) honouring the Ukrainian Commander of the Nachtigall Battalion - Roman Shukhevych on the 100th anniversary of his birth

Accusations have placed the Battalion in Lviv in July 1941 and claimed that the unit participated in the pogrom that took place. Some members of the unit did indeed participate in the pogrom, which implicates the unit as a whole.

World opinion: An international commission was set up at The Hague in the Netherlands in 1959 to carry out independent investigations. The members were four former anti-Hitler activists, Norwegian lawyer Hans Cappelen, former Danish foreign minister and president of the Danish parliament Ole Bjørn Kraft, Dutch socialist Karel van Staal, Belgian law professor Flor Peeters, and Swiss jurist and member of parliament Kurt Scoch. Following its interrogation of a number of Ukrainian witnesses between November 1959 and March 1960, the commission concluded: "After four months of inquiries and the evaluation of 232 statements by witnesses from all circles involved, it can be established that the accusations against the Battalion Nachtigall and against the then Lieutenant and currently Federal Minister Oberländer have no foundation in fact".

The Ukrainian side states that none of the allegations have been proven by any documents and that the Battalion's main priority was securing the radio station, newspapers and proclaiming Ukrainian independence.

Canadian Investigation: In December 1986, a document published by the Canadian Commission on War Criminals in Canada (Deschênes Commission) that look into allegations of war criminals residing in Canada made between 1971 and 1986, did not mention any members of the Nachtigall battalion. Moreover, it concluded, that units collaborating with the Nazis should not be indicted as a group and that mere membership in such units was not sufficient to justify prosecution.

Yad Vashem's Encyclopedia of the Holocaust contends that between June 30 and July 3, 1941, in the days that the Battalion was in Lviv, the Nachtigall soldiers together with the German army and the local Ukrainians participated in the killings of Jews in the city. The Encyclopedia of the Holocaust states that the unit was removed from Lviv on July 7 and sent to the Eastern Front.

The Polish side contends that members of the Nazi-led Nachtigall battalion also participated in the massacres of Polish professors, including the ex-Polish Prime minister Kazimierz Bartel, Tadeusz Boy-Żeleński and others, in Lwów in 1941. See Massacre of Lviv professors.

== Sources ==
- (in Russian) Chuyev, Sergei Ukrainskyj Legion - Moskva, 2006
- Ukrainians in the military during World War II
