= Roman Shukhevych =

Ukrainian nationalist militant (1907–1950)

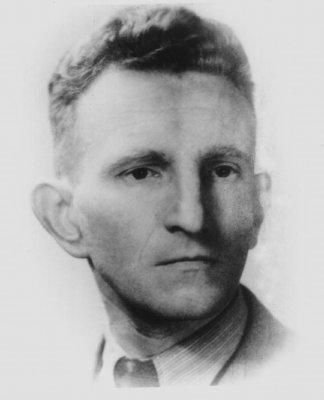
- Shukhevych in 1944
- Born: 30 June 1907; Lemberg, Austria-Hungary
- Died: 5 March 1950 (aged 42); Bilohorshcha, Ukrainian SSR, Soviet Union
- Cause of death: Suicide by gunshot
- Military career
- Allegiance: UVO (1925–1929); OUN (1929–1940); Carpatho-Ukraine (1939); OUN-B (1940–1950); Nazi Germany (1941–1942); National Government (1941); UHVR (1944–1950)
- Branch: Polish Army (1928–1929); Carpathian Sich (1938–1939); Nachtigall Battalion (1941); Schutzmannschaft 201 (1941–1942); UPA (1943–1950)
- Service years: 1928–1950
- Rank: General
- Nicknames: Tur, Taras Chuprynka
- Conflicts: Invasion of Carpatho-Ukraine; World War II; UPA insurgency in western Ukraine
- Awards: Cross of Combat Merit (posthumously); Cross of Merit (posthumously); Hero of Ukraine (posthumously; annulled in 2011)

Roman-Taras Osypovych Shukhevych (Ukrainian: Роман-Тарас Осипович Шухевич, also known by his pseudonym, Tur and Taras Chuprynka; 30 June 1907 – 5 March 1950) was a Ukrainian nationalist and a military leader of the nationalist Ukrainian Insurgent Army (UPA), which during the Second World War fought against the Soviet Union and to a lesser extent against Nazi Germany for Ukrainian independence. He collaborated with the Nazis from February 1941 to December 1942 as commanding officer of the Nachtigall Battalion in early 1941, and as a Hauptmann of the German Schutzmannschaft 201 auxiliary police battalion in late 1941 and 1942.

Shukhevych led some of the Galicia-Volhynia massacres, where tens of thousands of Polish civilians were killed. It is unclear to what extent Shukhevych was responsible for the massacres of Poles in Volhynia, but he condoned them afterwards, and directed the murders of Poles in Eastern Galicia. Historian Per Anders Rudling has accused the Ukrainian diaspora and Ukrainian academics of "ignoring, glossing over, or outright denying" OUN's role in the massacres.

== Life ==
Shukhevych was born in the city of Lemberg (now Lviv), in the Galicia region of Austria-Hungary (some sources claim his place of birth as Krakovets). He studied at the Lviv Academic Gymnasium, living with his grandfather, Volodymyr Shukhevych, an ethnographer. His political formation was influenced by Yevhen Konovalets, the commander of the Ukrainian Military Organization, who rented a room in Yevhen Konovalets's father's house from 1921 to 1922.

=== Education ===
In October 1926, Shukhevych entered the Lviv Polytechnic Institute (then Politechnika Lwowska – when the city of Lwów was part of the Second Polish Republic) to study civil engineering. In July 1934 he completed his studies with an engineering degree in road-bridge speciality. He was also an accomplished musician and with his brother Yuriy completed studies in piano and voice at the Lysenko Music Institute. During his studies, Shukhevych became an active member of the Ukrainian Scouting organization Plast. He was a member of Lisovi Chorty. He organized Plast groups and founded the "Chornomortsi" (Black Sea Cossacks) kurin in 1927.

From 1928 to 1929, Shukhevych did his military service in the Polish army. As a tertiary student, he was automatically sent for officer training. However, he was deemed unreliable, and instead completed his military service as a private in the artillery in Volhynia.

=== Ukrainian Military Organization ===
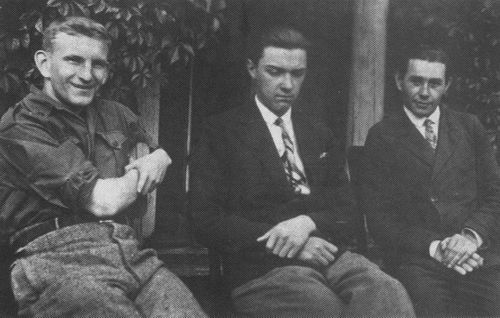
Shukhevych (left) in the Second Polish Republic in 1930

In 1925 Shukhevych joined the Ukrainian Military Organization (UVO). In 1926 the regional team of UVO ordered Shukhevych to assassinate the Lwów school superintendent, Stanisław Sobiński accused of "Polonizing" the Ukrainian education system. Roman Shukhevych and Bohdan Pidhainy carried out the assassination on 19 October 1926. In 1928–29 Shukhevych served his military service in the Polish Army in the artillery.

In February 1929 the Organization of Ukrainian Nationalists (OUN) was founded in Vienna. Shukhevych, under the name "Dzvin" (Bell), became a representative of the Ukrainian Executive.

Shukhevych was a leader of a wave of attacks against Polish property and homes in Galicia in 1930, intended to provoke Polish authorities into retaliation and to radicalize Ukrainian society.

Shukhevych planned and also participated in terrorist activities and assassinations, including but not limited to:

- the co-ordination of a series of expropriations from Polish government offices in order to fund continued insurrection in the struggle for Ukrainian national determination, i.e. bank robberies and assaults on postal offices or wagons.
- the 1 September 1931 assassination of Tadeusz Hołówko, a moderate Polish politician, who advocated cultural autonomy for Ukrainians. His murder caused a shock and was condemned by both Ukraine and Poland.
- the unsuccessful attempted assassination of the Soviet consul in Lviv as a protest for the Holodomor in Central Ukraine. (Mykola Lemyk mistakenly assassinated the special emissary of the NKVD, Alexiy Mayov, instead.)
- the 30 November 1932 assault on the post office in Gródek Jagielloński with Shukhevych's direct participation, in which a number of civilians were killed.

Shukhevych, with Stepan Bandera, Stepan Lenkavskyi, Yaroslav Stetsko, Yaroslav Starukh, and others developed a concept of "permanent revolution". According to their manifesto, the Ukrainian people, exploited by an occupier, could only obtain freedom through continued assault on the enemy. As a result, the OUN took on the task of preparing for an all-Ukrainian revolt.

Shukhevych took an active part in developing a concept regarding the formation of a Ukrainian army. At that time two diametrically opposed arguments existed. The first proposed forming a Ukrainian army of Ukrainian emigrants; the second advocated recruiting a national army in Western Ukraine organized by Ukrainians.

=== Imprisonment ===
After the 15 June 1934 OUN assassination of Polish Internal Affairs Minister Bronisław Pieracki, Shukhevych was arrested on 18 July and was sent to the Bereza Kartuska Prison. In December 1935 he was acquitted and released due to lack of incriminating evidence.

From 19 January 1935, Shukhevych was confined to the Brygitki prison in Lwów. He was incarcerated for his membership in the Regional executive of the OUN. The lawyer in the trial was his uncle Stepan Shukhevych. Shukhevych was sentenced to three years in jail; however, because of the 1935 amnesty he was released from jail after spending half a year in the Bereza Kartuska and two years in another prison.

During the Warsaw trial against the OUN (18 November 1935 – 13 January 1936), Shukhevych was called as a witness. Shukhevych stood by his right to speak in Ukrainian for which he was fined 200 złoty. After greeting the court with the call "Glory to Ukraine", he was immediately sentenced to one day in jail.

During the Lwów trial against the OUN (25 May – 27 June 1936), Shukhevych was accused of treason, belonging to anti-government organization of OUN and sentenced to three years imprisonment. He was released in an amnesty on 27 January 1937.

After being released in 1937, Shukhevych set up an advertising cooperative called "Fama", which became a front for the activities of the OUN. Soon outlets were set up throughout Galicia, Volhynia, and within the rest of Polish territory. The workers of the company were members of the OUN, often recently released political prisoners. The company was very successful and had sections working with the press and film, publishing booklets, printing posters, selling mineral water, and compiling address listings. It also opened its own transportation section.

=== Carpathian Ukraine ===
In November 1938, Carpathian Ruthenia gained autonomy within the Czechoslovak state. Shukhevych organized financial aid for the government of the fledgling republic and sent OUN members to set up the Carpathian Sich. In December 1938, he illegally crossed the border from Poland into Czechoslovakia, traveling to the Ruthenian city of Khust. There, with the aid of local OUN members and German intelligence, he set up the general headquarters for the fight against the Czechoslovak central government.

Moreover, in January 1939 the OUN decided to throw off the autonomous government, which seemed too pro-Czechoslovak to them. The coup d'état attempt occurred on the night of 13–14 March, in relation to the proclamation of Slovak independence, managed by Germany. With help of sympathizers among the police, the insurgents led by Shukhevych obtained the weapons of the gendarmerie, but their assaults on garrisons of the Czechoslovak army failed. Just in Khust 11 OUN fighters were killed and 51 captured. However, after the creation of the Slovak Republic on 14 March and the Nazis' seizure of Czech lands on 15 March, Carpathian Ruthenia was immediately invaded and annexed by Hungary. Shukhevych took an active part in the short-term armed conflict with Hungarian forces and was almost killed in one of the actions.

After the occupation of Carpathian Ruthenia by Hungary ended, Shukhevych traveled through Romania and Yugoslavia to Austria, where he consulted with OUN commanders and was given new orders and sent to Danzig to carry out subversive activities.

== World War II ==
The Nazis and Soviets signed the Molotov–Ribbentrop pact in August 1939, and in September Germany and the USSR invaded Poland, starting World War II and creating new challenges and opportunities for the Ukrainian nationalist movement. In autumn 1939 Shukhevych moved to Kraków with his family where he acted as the contact for the Ukrainian Nationalist Command directed by Andriy Melnyk. He organized the illegal transportation of documents and materials across the Soviet-German border and collected information about OUN activities in Ukraine.

The leadership of the Ukrainian nationalists could not come to a unified agreement regarding tactics. As a result, on 10 February 1940, the organization in Kraków split into two factions - one led by Stepan Bandera and the other by Andriy Melnyk, known as OUN-B and OUN-M respectively. Shukhevych became a member the Revolutionary Command of the OUN-B headed by Bandera, taking charge of the section dealing with territories claimed by the Ukrainians, which after the Molotov–Ribbentrop pact had been seized by Germany (Pidliashshia, Kholm, Nadsiania and Lemkivshchyna).

A powerful web was formed for the preparation of underground activities in Ukraine. Paramilitary training courses were set up. Military cadres were prepared that were to command a future Ukrainian army. Shukhevych prepared the Second Great Congress of the OUN which took place in April 1941.

=== Nachtigall Battalion ===
Prior to Operation Barbarossa in late June 1941, the OUN actively cooperated with Nazi Germany. According to the National Academy of Sciences of Ukraine and other sources, OUN-B leader Stepan Bandera held meetings with the heads of Germany's intelligence, regarding the formation of the "Nachtigall" and "Roland" Battalions. On 25 February 1941, the head of the Abwehr, Wilhelm Franz Canaris, sanctioned the creation of the "Ukrainian Legion" under German command. The unit would have had 800 persons. Shukhevych became a commander of the Legion from the OUN-B side. OUN expected that the unit would become the core of the future Ukrainian army. In the spring the OUN received 2.5 million marks for subversive activities against the USSR.

In spring 1941 the legion was reorganized into three units. One of the units became known as Nachtigall Battalion, a second became the Roland Battalion, and a third was immediately dispatched into the Soviet Union to sabotage the Red Army's rear. After intensive training the battalion traveled to Riashiv on 18 June, and one company entered Lviv on 29 June. The company's march to Lviv took them through Radymno. On arrival in Lviv, Shukhevych reportedly found the body of his brother among the victims of the NKVD prisoner massacres.

In Lviv, in the evening of 30 June, the Act for establishment of the Ukrainian Statehood was proclaimed. The German administration however did not support this act. The first company of the unit remained in Lviv for only seven days, while the remainder of the unit joined later during their eastward march towards Zolochiv, Ternopil and Vinnytsia.

It is estimated that in June–July 1941 over 4,000 Jews were murdered in pogroms in Lviv and other cities in Western Ukraine. There is controversy regarding the extent and scope of the participation of the Nachtigall Battalion and Roman Shukhevych in these atrocities, as well as in the Massacre of Lviv professors. The Polish historical consensus is that the battalion, as a unit, participated directly in the pogrom, giving and receiving assistance from the Nazis.

The German refusal to accept the OUN(b)’s proclamation of Ukrainian independence led to a conflict with the leadership of the Nachtigall battalion. On August 13, 1941, it was disarmed and ordered to return from Vinnytsia to Neuhammer in Silesia, from which its members were transported to Frankfurt an der Oder.

=== Schutzmannschaft Battalion 201 ===
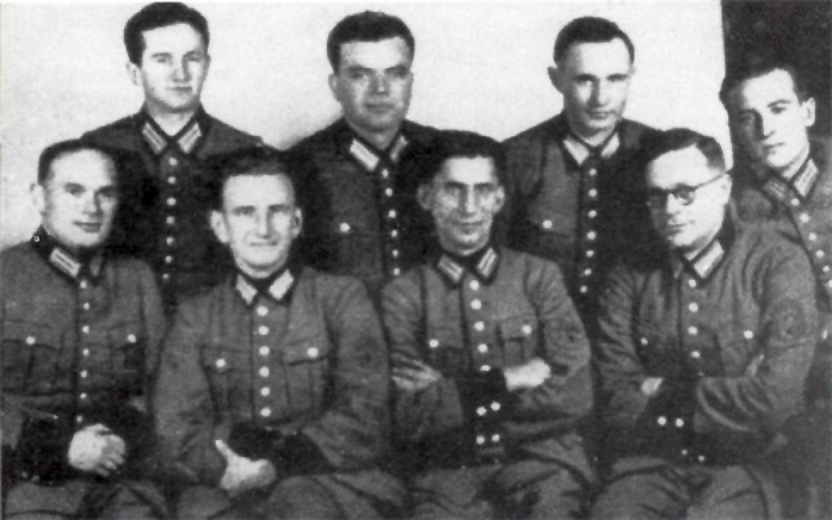
Schutzmannschaft Battalion 201 leaders, with Roman Shukhevych (sitting, second from left), 1942

In November 1941, the Ukrainian personnel of the Nachtigall and Roland Battalions were reorganized into Schutzmannschaft Battalion 201. It numbered 650 persons who were given individual contracts that required the combatants to serve for one additional year.

Shukhevych's titles were that of Hauptmann of the first company and deputy commander of the battalion, which was commanded by Yevhen Pobihushchyi.

On 19 March 1942, the battalion arrived in Belarus where it served in the triangle between Mogilev, Vitebsk, and Lepel. With the expiration of the one-year contract, all the Ukrainian soldiers refused to renew their services. On the beginning of January 1943, the battalion was sent to Lviv and there it was disbanded. Many of its former members formed the core of the OUN (B) security service. Others joined the Schutzmannschaft Battalion 57, returned to Belarus and continued to fight against the partisans and civilians. Shukhevych decided to join OUN (B) and quickly gained a leading role in the organization.

Polish-German historian and Holocaust expert Frank Golczewski from the University of Hamburg describes the activities of the 201st Schutzmannschaft Battalion in Belarus as "fighting partisans and killing Jews". John Paul Himka, a specialist in Ukrainian history during World War II, notes that although units such as the 201st Battalion were routinely used to fight partisans and kill Jews, no one has studied the specific activities of the 201st Battalion from this perspective, and this ought to be a subject for further study. It is alleged that more than 2,000 Soviet partisans were killed by the battalion during its operation in Belarus.

On 1 December 1942 after the expiration of their contracts, the members of the battalion refused to promulgate it. As a result, the 201st Battalion personnel was taken into detention and relocated to Lviv. The German command suggested to all those who had been in the battalion to gather in Lublin to form a new unit, however, none of the Ukrainians signed up, and very few reported to Lublin. Some were arrested and placed in the jail on Lonsky street, while Shukhevych escaped, and went into hiding.

=== Ukrainian Insurgent Army ===
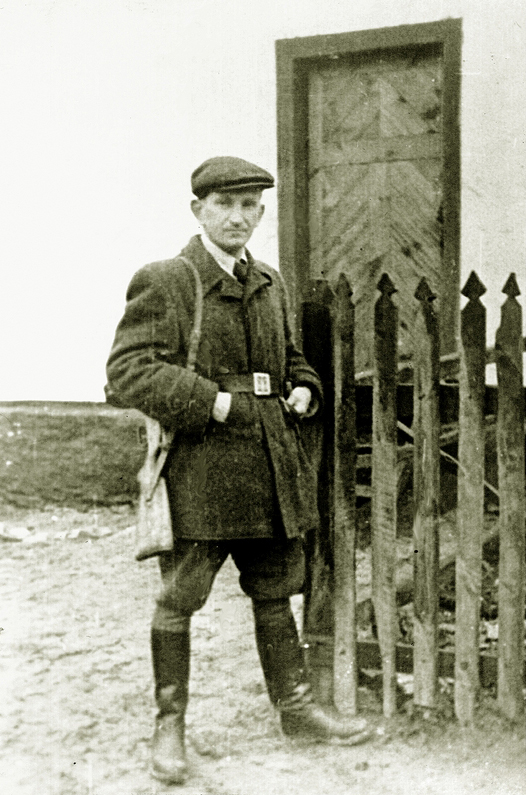
Shukhevych, October 1943

After escaping from German custody in late 1942 Shukhevych once again headed the military section of the OUN. In May he became a member of the leadership of the OUN and in time the head. In August 1943 at the Third Special Congress of the OUN, he was elected head of the Direction of the OUN and Supreme Commander of the Ukrainian Insurgent Army known as UPA.

Under Shukhevych's leadership the evolution of the program for which the OUN fought was further refined. Its core tenets were:

- Opposition to all forms of totalitarian government
- Construction of a democratic state system in Ukraine
- Guaranteed right for self-determination against empire and imperialism.

According to Ukrainian historian and former UPA soldier Lev Shankovsky, immediately upon assuming the position of commander of UPA Shukhevych issued an order banning participation in anti-Jewish activities. No written record of this order, however, has been found.

The UPA was joined by various people from the Caucasus and Central Asia who had fought in German formations. The rise of non-Ukrainians in the Ukrainian Insurgent Army gave stimulus to the special conference for Captive Nations of Europe and Asia which took place 21–22 November 1943 in Buderazh, not far from Rivne. The agenda included the formation of a unified plan for the attack against occupational forces.

During the period of German occupation Shukhevych spent most of his time fighting in the forests, and from August 1944, following Ukraine's annexation by the Soviet Army, he lived in various villages in Western Ukraine. In order to unite all Ukrainian national forces to fight for Ukrainian independence, Shukhevych organized a meeting between all the Ukrainian political parties. As a result, the Ukrainian Supreme Liberation Council (UHVR) was formed.

=== Massacres of Poles ===
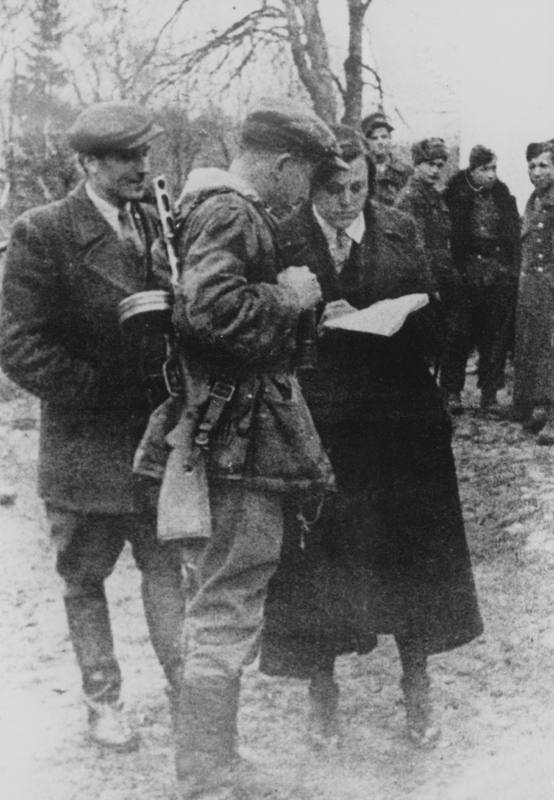
Shukhevych, Dmytro Hrytsai and Kateryna Meshko in Buchach, 1943, shortly before the massacres of Poles in Volhynia and Eastern Galicia.

In spring 1943, the OUN-B's UPA launched a campaign of murder and expulsion against the Polish population of Volhynia, and in early 1944 against the Poles in Eastern Galicia. This was done as a preemptive strike in expectation of a larger Polish-Ukrainian conflict over disputed territories, which were annexed and internationally recognized as part of Poland in 1923.

The Polish government in exile wanted to restore eastern Polish borders beyond the Curzon Line, an aim that was also supported by promises from the Western Allies. The OUN regarded Galicia and Volhynia as ethnic Ukrainian territory that should be included in a future restored Ukrainian republic.

It is estimated that up to 100,000 Poles were killed by the Ukrainian nationalists during the conflict and another 300,000 made refugees as a result of the ethnic cleansing. Conversely, killings of Ukrainians by Poles resulted in between 10,000 and 12,000 deaths in Volhynia, Eastern Galicia and present-day Polish territory. Historian Per Anders Rudling has stated that Shukhevych commanded the UPA since the summer of 1943, when tens of thousands of Poles were massacred.

Rudling has argued that since the early 1950s, the Ukrainian diaspora and Ukrainian academics have been manufacturing a whitewashed version of Shukhevych's life, in which his role in the massacres of Poles and other war crimes is "ignored, glossed over, or outright denied."

== Death ==
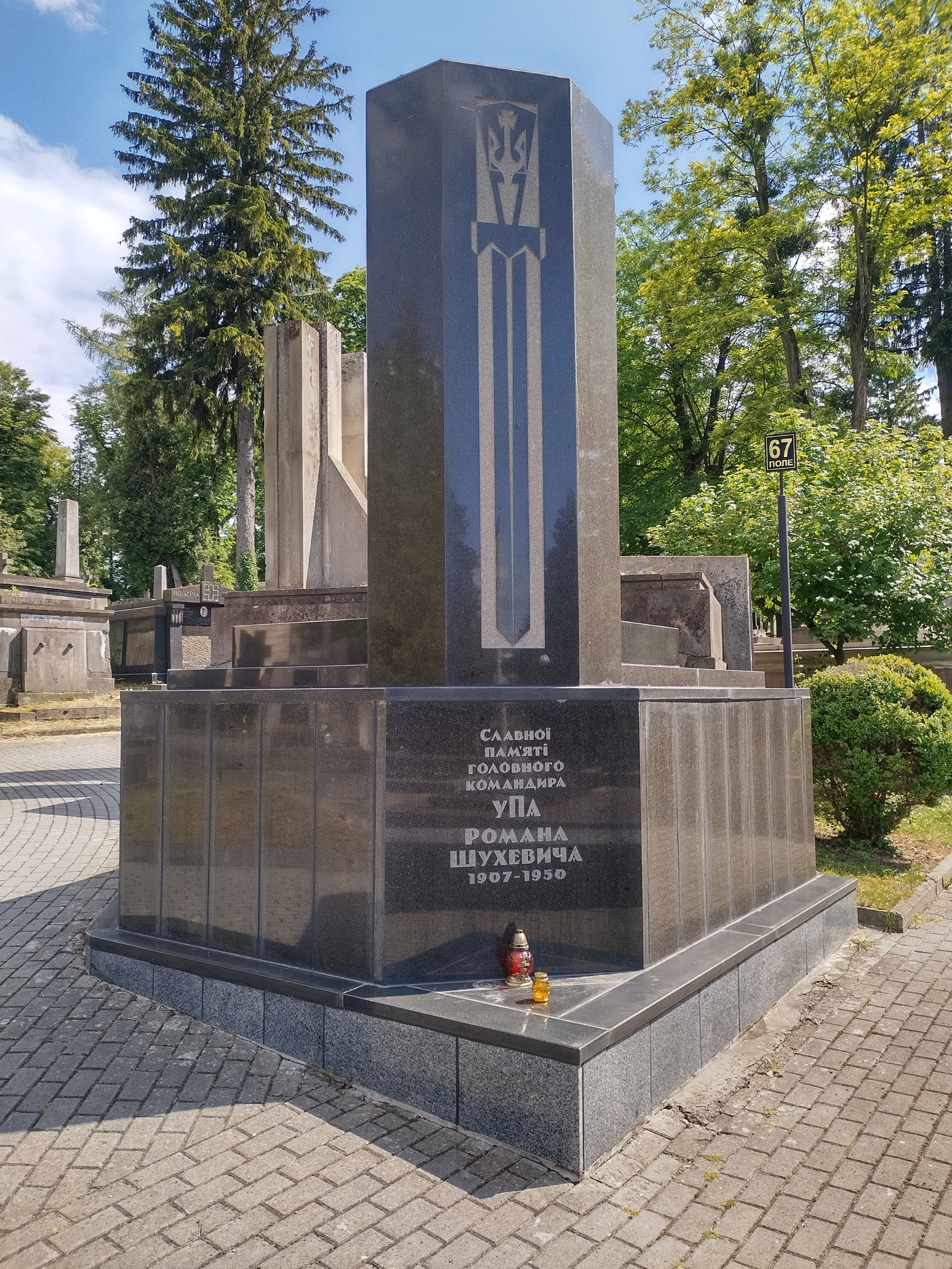
Shukhevych's cenotaph on Lychakiv Cemetery in Lviv

Shukhеvych died in an armed fight with agents of the MGB (Ministry of State Security) that attacked his hiding place (kryivka) in the village of Bilohorshcha (today part of the city of Lviv) on 5 March 1950, when he was 42. His residence was surrounded by some 700 soldiers of Internal Troops. In a firefight, Major Rovenko perished with Shukhevych. Shukhevych was succeeded as leader of UPA by Vasyl Kuk.

After identification, the body of Shukhevych was cremated and its remnants secretly buried. According to NKVD officers' memoirs, Roman Shukhevych's body was transported out of the western part of Ukraine, burned, and the ashes scattered on the left bank of the Zbruch. A memorial cross has been erected near the village of Hukiv, where Shukhevych's remains had been disposed into the river.

== Family ==
Soviet authorities applied the rationale of collective guilt and persecuted all the members of the Shukhevych family. Roman's brother Yuri was murdered at Lviv's Brygidki Prison, just before the German occupation of Lviv as part of an "unloading" policy. His mother Yevhenia and his wife, Nataliya Berezynska, were exiled to Siberia. His father, Joseph-Zinovy Vladimirovich Shukhevych (1879—1948) by that time disabled, was also repressed and exiled. He died soon after arriving at prison.

His son Yuri Shukhevych and daughter Mariyka were placed in an orphanage. In September 1972, Yuri was sentenced to ten years' camp imprisonment and another five years' exile after already having spent 20 years in Soviet camps. During that time he lost his vision.

== Legacy ==
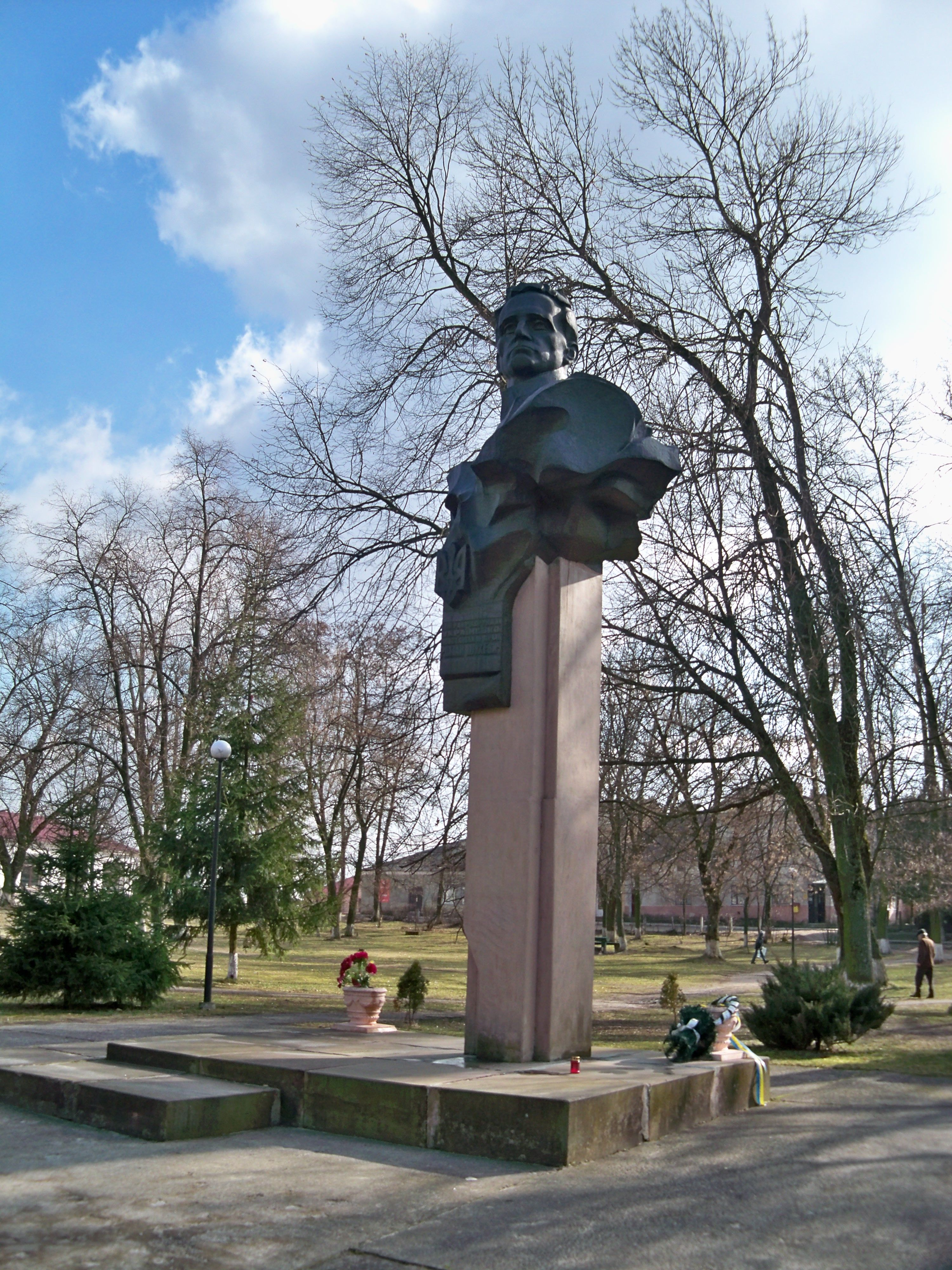
Monument to Shukhevych in Krakovets, Ukraine, 2016

While agreeing that Shukhevych was a radical nationalist fighting for Ukraine's independence, historians consider Shukhevych's legacy to be marred by his collaboration with the Nazis, and role in massacring Poles.

As Per Anders Rudling writes, "Shukhevych’s critics portray him as a war criminal; his admirers either overlook this episode or regard his collaboration with Nazi Germany as unproblematic"; "A freedom fighter and martyr for Ukraine to some, a Nazi collaborator to others". As Rudling notes, a historian should question the glorification of Shukhevych without "legitimizing the ideology of the organizations" Shukhevych led. Historians point out ‘the nationalism of the victim’, where Ukrainians were the victims, but also the collaborators with the totalitarian regimes others and themselves were the victims of. Rudling characterizes the glorification of Shukhevych as Ukrainian nationalist propaganda using Soviet propaganda techniques. In his book Tarnished Heroes, Rudling elaborates further on these justifications, describing nationalists as using a "moral alibi" for these crimes, re-framing them as defensive.

In 2015, the Ukrainian government criminalized "denying the legitimacy" of the OUN/UPA, declaring any public disrespect towards the nationalist narrative of the organization unlawful. Many scholars from inside and outside Ukraine criticized this law in an open letter as a form of academic censorship and government-backed historical revisionism. Georgiy Kasianov, a scholar at the Institute of the History of Ukraine at Harvard, notes that the Ukrainian government has engaged in many (often successful) attempts at whitewashing the history of Nazi collaboration within the OUN, and Shukhevych specifically. In 2018 the Ukrainian parliament successfully passed a law that - under the guise of expanding veterans benefits - actually worked to "whitewash the image of organizations whose collaboration with the Nazis and role in the Holocaust and other ethnic cleansings" by equalizing the veteran status of UPA fighters and those in the "anti-Nazi coalition."

Ivan Katchanovski, a political scientist in the School of Political Studies & Conflict Studies & Human Rights Program at the University of Ottawa, described a campaign of political rehabilitation and glorification of OUN/UPA members. In 2007, as part of this campaign, then-President Yushchenko denied Shukhevych's involvement in "anti-Jewish actions." Historian Sergey Zhuk criticizes Katchanovski for his, according to Zhuk, post-2013 anti-Ukrainian position.

A number of nationalist Ukrainian diaspora groups, academics, and politicians, or in various instances the Ukrainian government, have minimized, justified, or outright denied Shukhevych's and UPA/OUN's role in the massacres.

=== Commemoration ===
On 23 October 2001, the Lviv Historical Museum converted the house in which Shukhevych was killed into a memorial museum. He was portrayed by Ukrainian-Canadian actor Hryhoriy Hladiy in the Ukrainian film Neskorenyi (The Undefeated).

In June 2017, Kyiv City Council renamed the city's General Vatutin Avenue into Roman Shukhevych Avenue. Nikolai Vatutin was a Soviet military commander during World War II who was killed by the UPA in an ambush. Also in June 2017, Lviv held a festival in Shukhevych's honour called "Shukhevychfest"; Eduard Dolinsky, the director of the Ukrainian Jewish Committee, condemned the event while Volodymyr Viatrovych, the director of Ukrainian Institute of National Memory, described Shukhevych as an "eminent personality" and defended the display of the symbols of the Galician SS division.

On 5 March 2021, the Ternopil City Council named the largest stadium in the city of Ternopil after Roman Shukhevych as the Roman Shukhevych Ternopil city stadium. On 16 March 2021, the Lviv Oblast Council likewise approved the renaming of their largest stadium after Shukhevych and Stepan Bandera, the former leader of the OUN.

On 1 January 2024, on what would have been Bandera's 115th birthday, the museum in Lviv dedicated to Shukhevych was bombed by Russian forces and burned down. Lviv Mayor Andriy Sadovyi characterized the strike on the museum as symbolic and vowed that the museum would be restored.

On 20 October 2026, local deputies of the Lviv Regional Council supported a resolution to designate 2027 as the Year of the Ukrainian Insurgent Army (UPA) and its commander-in-chief, Roman Shukhevych. Head of polish government Donald Tusk and the minister of defense criticized thes decision harsh. As a reaction Polish city of Przemyśl and the Lublin Voivodeship suspended cooperation with Lviv. Ukrainian foreign ministry called Regional Council's decision counterproductive and distances itself from it.

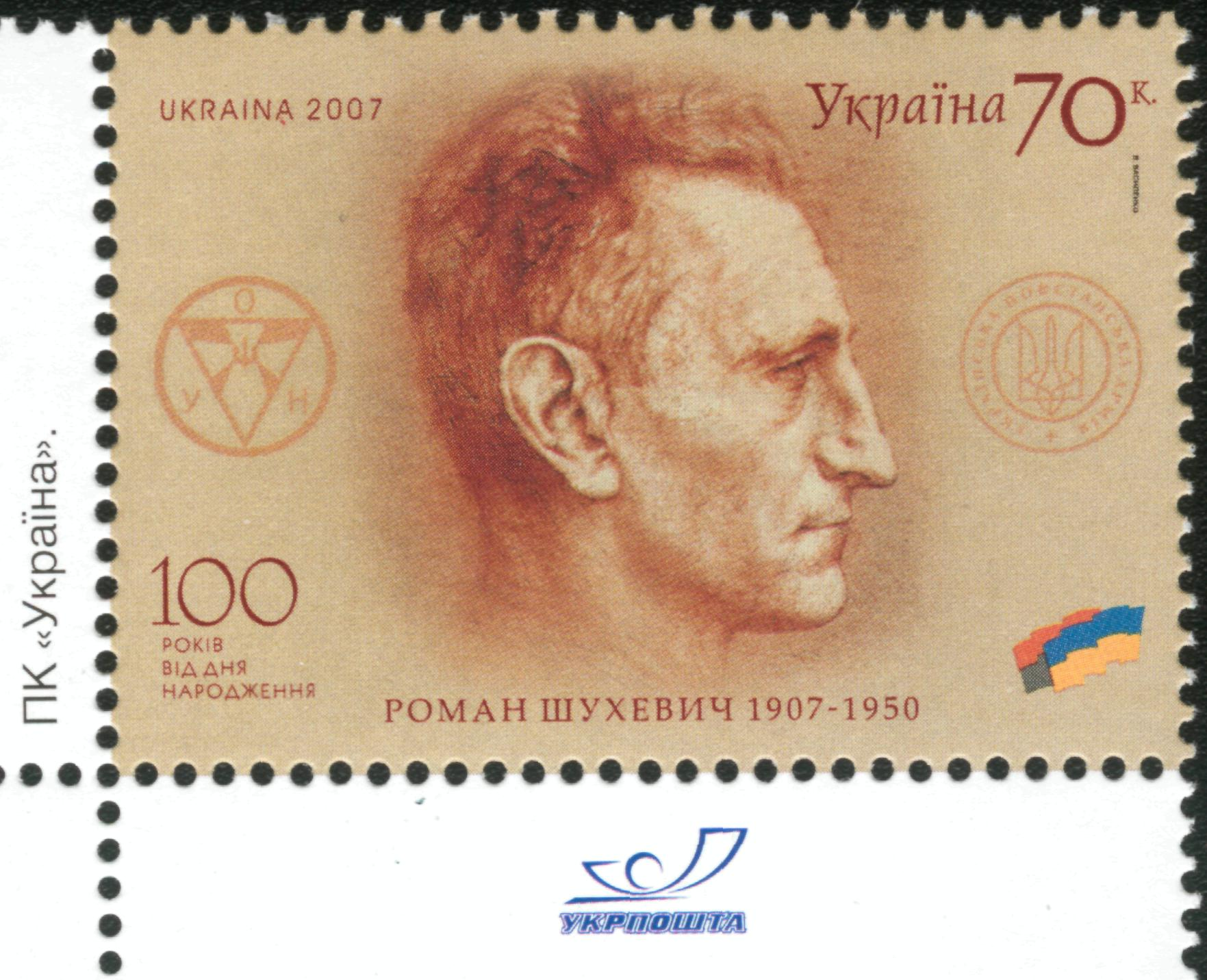
Ukrainian postage stamp honoring Shukhevych on the 100th anniversary (2007) of his birth.

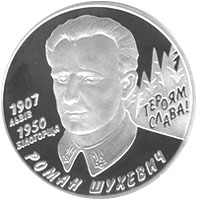
Commemorative coin depicting Shukhevych, 2008

=== Hero of Ukraine award (annulled) ===
Roman Shukhevych was posthumously conferred the title of Hero of Ukraine by President Viktor Yushchenko on 12 October 2007. On 12 February 2009, an administrative Donetsk region court ruled the Presidential decree awarding the title to be legal after a lawyer had claimed that his rights as a citizen were violated because Shukhevych was never a citizen of Ukraine.

President Viktor Yanukovych stated on 5 March 2010 he would make a decision to repeal the decrees to honor the title as Heroes of Ukraine to Shukhevych and fellow nationalist Stepan Bandera before the next Victory Day (in August 2011 he stated "if we look at our past history and build our future based on this history, which had numerous contradictions, we will rob our future, which is wrong"). Although the Hero of Ukraine decrees do not stipulate the possibility that a decree on awarding this title can be annulled, on 21 April 2010, the Donetsk Administrative Court of Appeals declared Yushchenko's 2007 decree awarding Shukhevych the Hero of Ukraine to have been unlawful. The court ruled that the former President had had no right to confer this title to Shukhevych, because Shukhevych had died in 1950 and therefore he had not lived on the territory of independent Ukraine (after 1991). Consequently, Shukhevych was not a Ukrainian citizen, and this title could not be awarded to him. On 12 August 2010 the High Administrative Court of Ukraine dismissed suits to declare four decrees by President Viktor Yanukovych on awarding the Hero of Ukraine title to Soviet soldiers illegal and cancel them. The filer of these suit stated they were based on the same arguments used by Donetsk Administrative Court of Appeals that on 21 April satisfied an appeal that deprived Roman Shukhevych the Hero of Ukraine title, as Shukhevych was not a citizen of Ukraine. The title however was not rescinded, pending an appeal to the Supreme Administrative Court of Ukraine which set aside all previous court decisions on 17 February 2011. The Supreme Administrative Court of Ukraine ruled Shukhevych's Hero of Ukraine title illegal in August 2011. On 1 September 2011 former President Yushchenko filed an appeal at the Supreme Court of Ukraine with a request that it cancel the ruling by the Supreme Administrative Court of Ukraine.

== See also ==
- Roman Shukhevych statue, a bust of Shukhevych at the Ukrainian Youth Unity Complex in Edmonton
