= Ukrainian national government (1941) =

1941 self-proclaimed government

Ukrainian National Government Українське Державне Правління (Ukrainian) Ukrainske Derzhavne Pravlinnia
- 1941
- Flag Seals (two versions)
- Anthem: Державний Гімн України; Derzhavnyi Himn Ukrainy "State Anthem of Ukraine"
- The territory where local administrations were captured by representatives of the OUN-B or their sympathizers
- Status: Unrecognized state
- Capital: Lviv
- Official languages: Ukrainian
- Government: Republican dictatorship
- Chairman of the Ukrainian State Administration and head of the resort of social reforms
  - 1941: Yaroslav Stetsko
- Head of the Council of Seniors
  - 1941: Kost Levitsky
- Honorary Head of the Council of Seniors
  - 1941: Andrey Sheptytsky
- Historical era: World War II
  - Declared: 30 June 1941
- Today part of: Ukraine

The Ukrainian national government (Ukrainian: Українське Державне Правління (УДП), romanized: Ukrainske Derzhavne Pravlinnia (UDP), lit. 'Ukrainian State Board') was a brief self-proclaimed Ukrainian government during the German invasion of the Soviet Union. The government was declared by the proclamation of the Ukrainian state on 30 June 1941, which also pledged to work with Nazi Germany. It was led by Stepan Bandera's faction of the Organization of Ukrainian Nationalists, the OUN-B.

When German troops entered Lviv, the German authorities told the leadership of the Ukrainian nationalists to disband. However, it did not, and its leaders were arrested.

== History ==
Nazi Germany launched Operation Barbarossa, its assault on the Soviet Union, on 22 June. That day, leaders of the OUN met in Kraków in occupied Poland, and established a Ukrainian National Committee (UNK), as a step towards a Ukrainian state. General Vsevolod Petriv was elected head of the committee in absentia with Volodymyr Horbovy chosen as acting leader and Viktor Andriievsky as second deputy. It sent a memorandum to Adolf Hitler affirming the Ukrainian people's aspirations for independence, readiness to fight the USSR and hope that Germany would respect Ukrainian sovereignty. On 5 July, the German security police arrested the organizers of the committee, bringing its existence to an end.

The Germans occupied Lviv on 30 June. Henryk Szyper reported that "German and Ukrainian flags were hung out everywhere" to welcome German troops, and the population "expected that a Ukrainian state of fascist kind would be established". Many thought that they found a new ally in Nazi Germany.

On the first day of the German occupation of the city, one of the wings of the Organization of Ukrainian Nationalists (OUN) declared restoration of the independent Ukrainian state. Yaroslav Stetsko proclaimed in Lviv the Government of an independent Ukraine that "will work closely with the National-Socialist Greater Germany, under the leadership of its leader Adolf Hitler, which is forming a new order in Europe and the world" – as stated in the text of the "Act of Proclamation of Ukrainian Statehood". This was done without pre-approval from the Germans. The Declaration of Independence took the German authorities completely by surprise, and they saw it as an attempted coup.

During the morning of 30 June, an ad hoc Ukrainian People's Militia was being formed in the city by the OUN. It included OUN activists who had moved in from Kraków with the Germans, OUN members who lived in Lviv, and former Soviet policemen who had either decided to switch sides or who were OUN members that had infiltrated the Soviet police. It initiated the first of two violent pogroms the following day.

On 5 July, OUN-B leader Bandera was placed under honorary arrest (Latin: custodia honesta) in Kraków, and transported to Berlin the next day. On 14 July, he was released, but required to stay in Berlin. On 12 July 1941 he was joined in Berlin by Stetsko, whom the Germans had moved from Lviv after an unsuccessful attempt by unknown persons to assassinate him. Bandera and Stetsko were held in the central Berlin prison at Spandau from 15 September 1941 until January 1942, when they were transferred to Sachsenhausen concentration camp's special barrack for high-profile political prisoners, Zellenbau. Some of the Ukrainian nationalists were driven underground, and from that time forward, they fought against the Nazis, while continuing also to fight against Poles and Soviet forces (see Ukrainian Insurgent Army).

Within two years of the declaration, the Germans had imprisoned or killed 80% of the leadership of the OUN-B.

Bandera and Stetsko themselves were released in 1944 by the Germans.

== Government structure ==
The government of 1941 was an attempt to include as many political parties in Ukraine as possible. The structure and nomenclature of the government functionaries were quite extensive. They included:

The Prime Minister was Yaroslav Stetsko

1. Deputy Prime Minister and Secretary of the Ministry of Health – Marian Panchyshyn – no political affiliation
2. Deputy Prime Minister – Lev Rebet (OUN)
3. Minister of the Interior – Volodymyr Lysy (Socialist Radical Party)
4. Minister of External Affairs – Volodymyr Stakhiv
5. Minister of Defence – Vsevolod Petriv (Social Revolution Party)
6. Minister of State Security – Mykola Lebed (OUN)
7. Minister of Justice – Yulian Fedusevych
8. Minister of Agriculture – Yevhen Khraplyvy
9. Minister of Health Marian Panchyshyn (no political affiliation)
10. Minister of Education Volodymyr Radzykevych (no political affiliation)
11. Minister of Communication N. Moroz (no political affiliation)
12. Minister of Information Oleksandr Hai-Holovko (no political affiliation)
13. Minister of Political Coordination Ivan Klymiv-Lehenda (OUN)
14. Deputy Minister of Interior Konstantyn Pankivsky (Socialist Radical Party)
15. Deputy Minister of External Affairs Oleksandr Maritchak (Ukrainian National-Democratic Party)
16. Deputy Minister of Defense Roman Shukhevych (OUN)
17. Deputy Minister of Defense Oleksandr Hasyn (OUN)
18. Deputy Minister of Justice Bohdan Dzerovych (no political affiliation)
19. Deputy Minister of Agriculture Andriy Piasetsky (Front of National Unity)
20. Deputy Minister of Health Roman Osinchuk

The government also featured a Council of Seniors, which was headed by Kost Levytsky.
