= Yevhen Stakhiv =

Ukrainian nationalist militant

- Native name: Євген Павлович Стахів
- Born: 15 September 1918 Premissel, Kingdom of Galicia and Lodomeria Austria-Hungary (now Przemyśl, Poland)
- Died: 26 January 2014 (aged 95) New York, New York, United States
- Allegiance: Carpatho-Ukraine; Organization of Ukrainian Nationalists
- Battles / wars: Hungarian invasion of Carpatho-Ukraine; World War II: Eastern Front

Yevhen Pavlovych Stakhiv (Ukrainian: Євген Павлович Стахів; Polish: Jewhen Stachiw; 15 September 1918 – 26 January 2014) was a Ukrainian nationalist militant in the Donbas during World War II and a member of the Organization of Ukrainian Nationalists.

== Early life and career ==
Yevhen Pavlovych Stakhiv was born in Przemyśl, in what was then Austria-Hungary and is now Poland, on 15 September 1918 to a Greek Catholic member of the Ukrainian Galician Army. The children of the Stakhiv family, including Yevhen, were imbued with a nationalist upbringing from birth, and all six sons would later join the Organization of Ukrainian Nationalists. From 1932, he was a member of Ukrainian school and youth organizations in Galicia during the Second Polish Republic. During this timeframe, he also joined the Organization of Ukrainian Nationalists.

In 1938, amidst the German occupation of Czechoslovakia, Stakhiv found himself in the territory of Carpathian Ruthenia, where he joined the ranks of the Carpathian Sich. In March 1939, at the end of the military conflict between the Kingdom of Hungary and the unrecognized Carpatho-Ukraine, he was captured by the Hungarians, but managed to escape to Nazi Germany through the territory of modern Slovakia.

In 1940, he worked with his older brother Volodymyr in the Ukrainian nationalist Ukrainian Press Service. In this time, he also studied at the Technical Hochschule Berlin-Charlottenburg (now Technische Universität Berlin).

== World War II ==
Following the June 1941 Act of restoration of the Ukrainian state, the government of Nazi Germany arrested the main leadership of the OUN. In response to this, it was decided to hold a propaganda and educational campaign for an independent Ukraine. At this time, Stakhiv was a member of the southern "OUN marching group", and led the organisation of new OUN cells in German-occupied eastern Ukraine - in particular, the cities of Kryvyi Rih, Dnipro, Mariupol, and Luhansk. In 1942, after having received an assignment from Vasyl Kuk, Stakhiv, together with the OUN marching groups, launched an underground network in the Donbas, where he managed to get considerable support.

== In exile ==
In 1944, Stakhiv fled Ukraine westwards. From 1946 to 1949, Stakhiv lived in West Germany, before emigrating to the United States. He was the head of the Ukrainian People's House in New York, and also was a member of the Ukrainian Supreme Liberation Council. Among the OUN, Stakhiv was a moderate figure who cautioned against what he regarded as extremism expressed by some members of the OUN, saying on one occasion that extremist nationalism was "artificially returned to [Ukraine]".

Starting in 1955, Stakhiv made various claims that the Young Guard partisan movement in the Donbas was, contrary to the commonly accepted viewpoint of it being a Soviet resistance movement, a nationalist cell created and led by himself. In particular, he argued: "We spread nationalist ideas from the Donbas to the Crimea, but it was precisely the fact that OUN members visited the cities of Eastern Ukraine that forced the third gathering of the OUN to retreat from extreme nationalism."

According to Stakhiv, Alexander Fadeyev in his novel "Young Guard" did not accidentally give the traitorous partisan the name "Yevgeny Stakhovich", because he was already known to the Soviet Ministry of State Security. Noting that he had fought against both Nazi Germany and the Soviet Union, Stakhiv refuted the slander against himself in the Ukrainian-American press and even tried unsuccessfully to bring Fadeyev to trial. Concerning Stakhiv's allegations about his involvement in the Young Guard, attempts were made to refute them.

Stakhiv's political activities continued into the 2000s, and he led the Society for Ukrainian-Jewish Relations from 2004. Following the 1991 declaration of Independence of Ukraine, Stakhiv remained in the United States, but returned to Ukraine regularly, meeting with youth representatives and famous politicians. In 1997, he was awarded the Order of Merit, 3rd degree, and in 2006, he received the Order of Prince Yaroslav the Wise in the 4th and 5th degrees, which he received from the hands of Viktor Yushchenko.

== Family and death ==
Stakhiv had six brothers, one of whom, Volodymyr, was also a significant member of the Ukrainian nationalist movement, and served as minister of foreign affairs in the government of Yaroslav Stetsko. His son, Yevhen-Zenon, was a member of the Intergovernmental Panel on Climate Change, and was among its members awarded the 2007 Nobel Peace Prize alongside Al Gore, "for their efforts to build up and disseminate greater knowledge about man-made climate change, and to lay the foundations for the measures that are needed to counteract such change." Stakhiv died in New York on 26 January 2014 at the age of 95.
