= Act of restoration of the Ukrainian state =

1941 act declaring a Ukrainian state

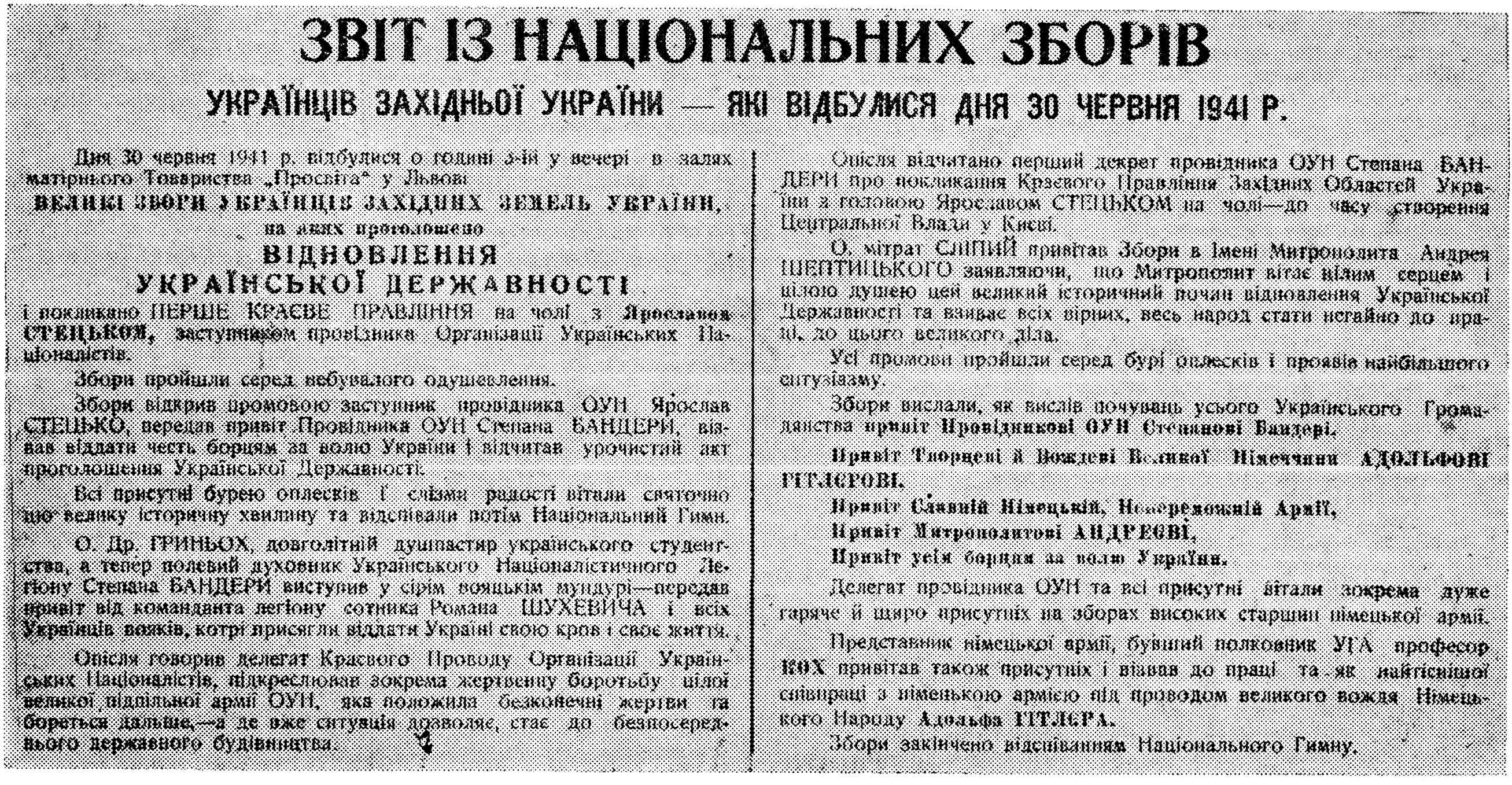
The report of the National Assembly in Lviv on June 30, 1941. Printed copy in the Zborivski Visti (Zboriv Herald)

The act of restoration of the Ukrainian state (Ukrainian: Акт відновлення Української Держави, romanized: Akt vidnovlennia Ukrainskoi Derzhavy) or proclamation of the Ukrainian state of June 30, 1941, was announced by the Organization of Ukrainian Nationalists (OUN) under the leadership of Stepan Bandera, who declared an independent Ukrainian state in Lviv. The self-proclaimed prime minister was Yaroslav Stetsko, and the head of the Council of Seniors was Kost Levytsky.

The OUN intended to take advantage of the retreat of Soviet forces from Ukraine during the German invasion of the Soviet Union that began on June 22. Their leaders thought that their movement had found a new powerful ally in Nazi Germany to aid them in their struggle against the Soviet Union. The Ukrainian nationalists began a series of pogroms against Jews, with many murdered and assaulted. Days after the German invasion and occupation of Lviv, however, the leadership of the newly formed government was arrested and sent to concentration camps in Germany.

== Background ==
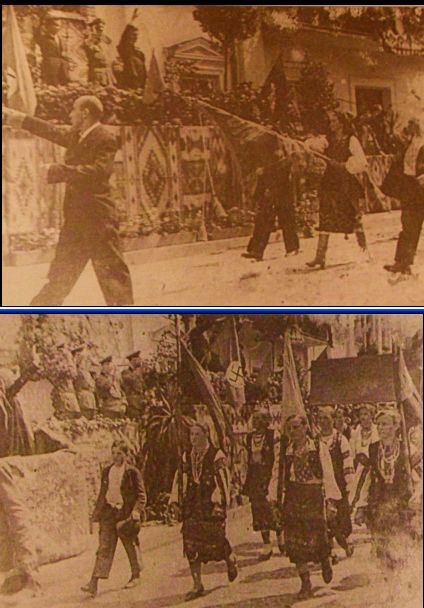
Late July 1941. Celebration of Bandera's OUN Ukrainian statehood proclamation. Nazi and OUN-B officials at the stand with Nazi and OUN-B flags. OUN activists greeted them with a Nazi/OUN-B salute.

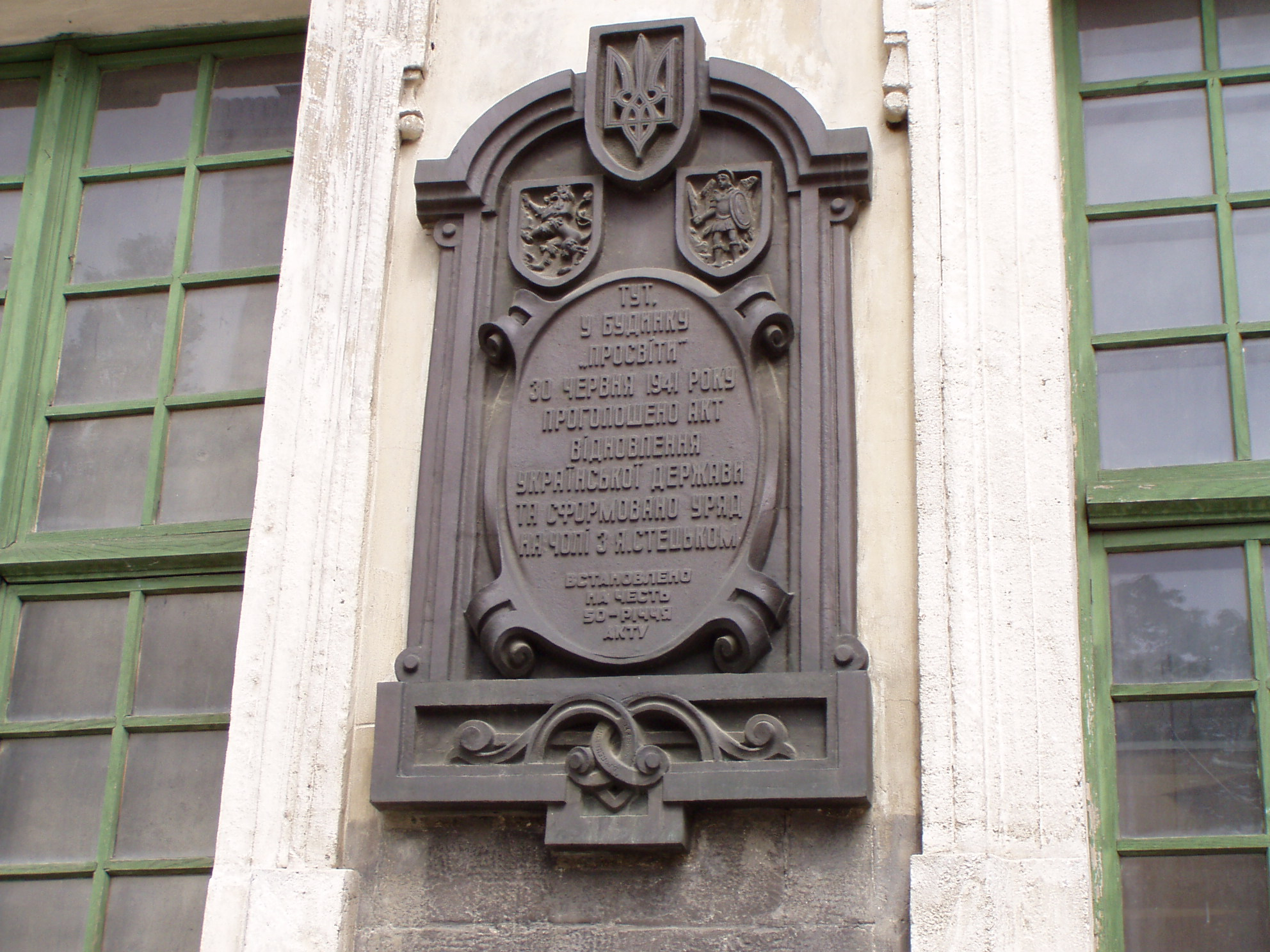
Plaque in the Rynkova Ploshcha [Market Square], 10, in Lviv commemorating the announcement of the Act of Restoration of the Ukrainian State in 1941.

=== Ukrainian territory between the World Wars ===
After World War I, Ukraine was divided into three parts: most of Central and Eastern Ukraine became the Ukrainian Soviet Socialist Republic in 1921. The capital was Kharkiv.

The majority of current Western Ukraine became part of the Second Polish Republic. This included the city of Lviv, which at the time was the center of Ukrainian nationalist activity.

A small part of current far Western Ukraine, the Zakarpattia, became part of Czechoslovakia. Northern Bukovina belonged to Romania.

=== The Ukrainian nationalist movement in western Ukraine ===
For various reasons, the Ukrainian nationalist movement was more active in Western Ukraine than in Central Ukraine in the inter-war period. At the end of World War I, veterans of the Sich Riflemen created the Ukrainian Military Organization in 1920 to promote the creation of an independent Ukrainian state. The leader was Yevhen Konovalets.

=== The Organization of Ukrainian Nationalists ===
In 1929, the Ukrainian Military Organization became the Organization of Ukrainian Nationalists. The first leader was Bohdan Kravciv. The stated goal of the OUN was the creation of an independent Ukrainian State.

In 1940, the OUN suffered a split into two groups - one group supported Andriy Melnyk (this group became known as the OUN-M, or "Melnykivtsi"), while the other group supported Stepan Bandera (this group became known as the OUN-B, or Banderivtsi). The OUN-B was considered the more radical of the two.

== Prelude to the Declaration ==
The OUN realized that an opportunity was available to fulfill their mandated plan: the creation of a new independent Ukraine.

On 22 June 1941, the Ukrainian National Committee was created in Kraków, with Volodymyr Horbovy as a president. The UNK published an essay, "Memorial", which outlined the plans of the OUN to declare independence. This essay was met with severe disapproval of the Nazi authorities, and the leaders of the UNK, Horbovy and Bandera, were told to rescind the document. They refused, and made their way to Lviv.

On 26 June 1941, Soviet forces fled from Lviv, and the Ukrainian Nachtigall Battalion, led by its commander Roman Shukhevych, entered the city in triumph to cheering crowds of joyful Ukrainians. With the departure of the Soviet Red Army, the OUN set up its headquarters in Lviv, and began to prepare for the big day.

== Preamble ==
In his memoirs Vasyl Kuk said:

On Monday June 30, at 6 p.m. on the second floor of the Prosvita building in Lviv (Rynok square 10) there was a community meeting. Community members living in Lviv and its environs, clergy, leading members of OUN, and members of the Ukrainian underground were gathered. The hall was overflowing with delegates. The meeting was called by the first assistant to the leader of the OUN Yaroslav Stetsko to honour the Ukrainian fighters who had laid down their lives fighting for Ukraine. In an intensive speech, he spoke about the political situation which Ukraine was in with the declaration of war, stating that once again this war will take place in Ukraine over these rich lands and that the Ukrainian people cannot stand idly by but must be active and participate. Regarding Germany, he stated that a Union with Germany was only possible if Germany recognized Ukrainian independence and its government. Stetsko read out the Proclamation of Ukrainian independence. Those present listened to the proclamation standing, unanimously endorsed it and sang the Ukrainian national anthem Shche ne vmerla Ukraina.

== Text ==
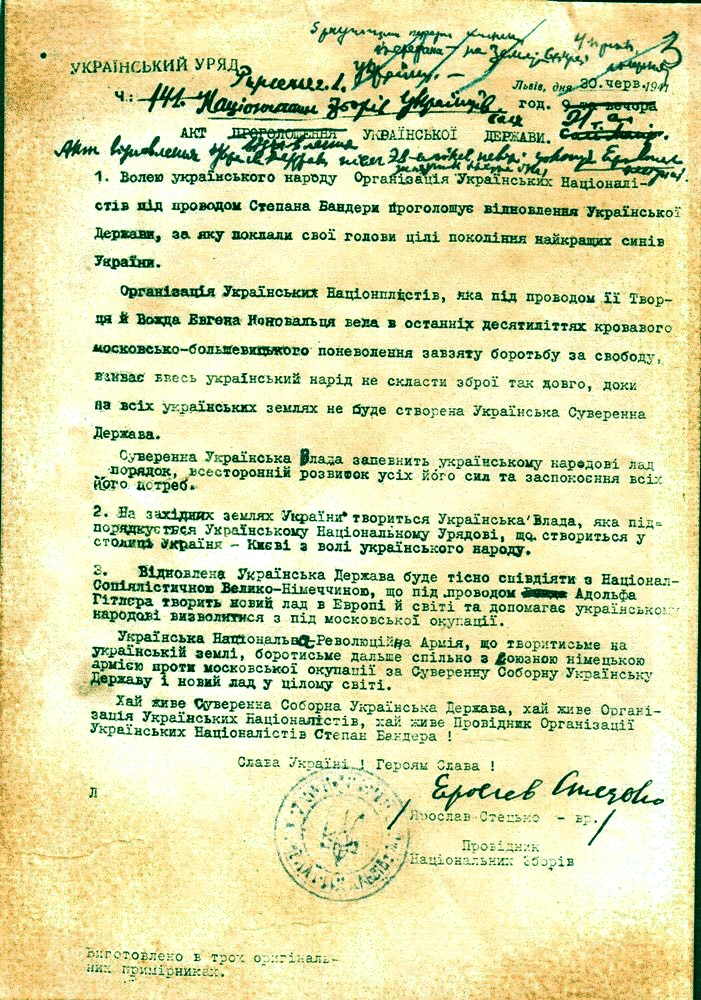
Act to restoration of Ukrainian State (autographed Yaroslav Stetsko)

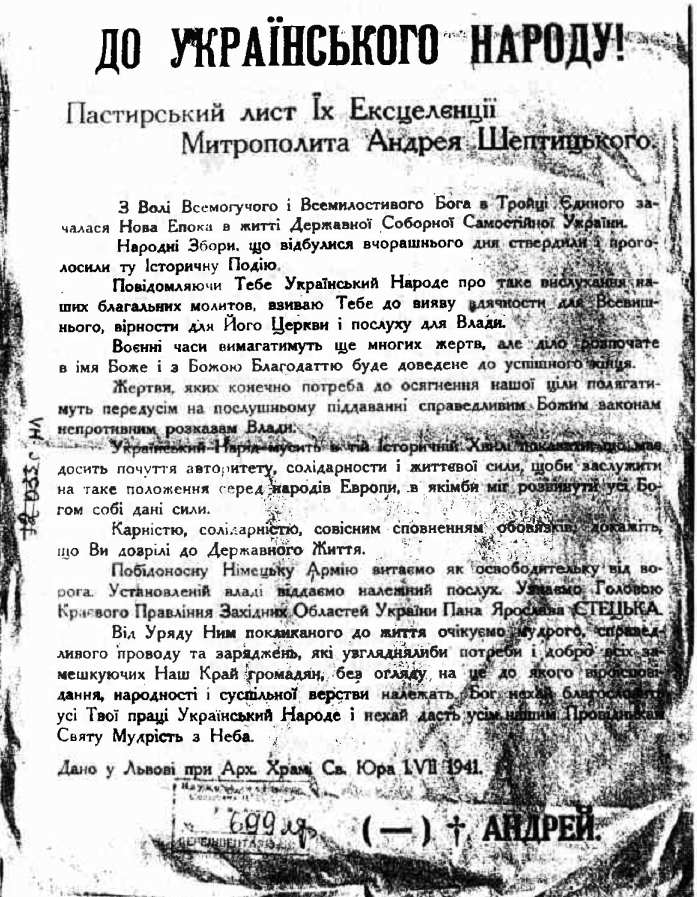
Andrey Sheptytsky Pastoral letter from July 1, 1941, with recognition of the Ukrainian Statehood at Western Ukraine

The Act of Proclamation of Ukrainian Statehood

1. By the will of the Ukrainian people, the Organization of Ukrainian Nationalists under the direction of Stepan Bandera proclaims the formation of the Ukrainian State for which have laid down their heads whole generations of the finest sons of Ukraine.

The Organization of Ukrainian Nationalists, which under the direction of founder and leader Yevhen Konovalets has undertaken in the past ten years a bloody battle with the Muscovite-Bolshevik enslavers in an energetic battle for freedom, calls all the Ukrainian people not to place down its weapons until all Ukrainian lands are united to form a Sovereign Ukrainian Government.

The Sovereign Ukrainian Government will guarantee Ukrainian people order, unilateral development of all its energies and all its needs.

2. In the western lands of Ukraine a Ukrainian Government is formed, which is subordinate to the Ukrainian National Government that will be formed in the capital of Ukraine – Kyiv.

3. The newly formed Ukrainian state will work closely with the National-Socialist Greater Germany, under the leadership of its leader Adolf Hitler which is forming a new order in Europe and the world and is helping the Ukrainian People to free itself from Muscovite occupation. (Note: Section 3 of the Stanislaviv version is often omitted in Ukrainian Diaspora publications dealing with this subject.)

The Ukrainian People's Revolutionary Army which has been formed on the Ukrainian lands, will continue to fight with the Allied German Army against Muscovite occupation for a sovereign and united State and a new order in the whole world.

Long live a Sovereign and United Ukraine!
Long live the Organization of Ukrainian Nationalists! Long live the leader of the Organization of Ukrainian Nationalists and the Ukrainian people, STEPAN BANDERA!

GLORY TO UKRAINE! TO HER HEROES, GLORY!

== Government ==
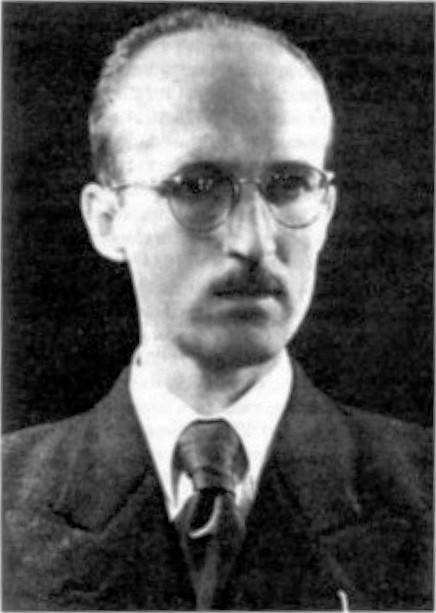
Yaroslav Stetsko, First Deputy Chief of the OUN (r) Stepan Bandera

State seal of the Government of the Ukrainian state 1941.

After the proclamation of the Ukrainian state, a government was announced. This government included politicians from various parties, as well as political ideologies. They were:

- Prime Minister Yaroslav Stetsko (OUN)
- Deputy Prime Minister Markian Panchyshyn (no political affiliation)
- Deputy Prime Minister Lev Rebet (OUN)
- Minister of Interior Volodymyr Lysy (Socialist Radical Party)
- Deputy Minister of Interior Konstantyn Pankivsky (Socialist Radical Party)
- Minister of External Affairs Volodymyr Stakhiv (OUN)
- Deputy Minister of External Affairs Oleksandr Maritchak (Ukrainian National-Democratic Party)
- Minister of Defense Vsevolod Petriv (Social Revolutionary Party)
- Deputy Minister of Defense Roman Shukhevych (OUN)
- Deputy Minister of Defense Oleksandr Hasyn (OUN)
- Minister of State Security Mykola Lebed (OUN)
- Minister of Justice Yulian Fedusevych (no political affiliation)
- Deputy Minister of Justice Bohdan Dzerovych (no political affiliation)
- Secretary of the Ministry of National Economy Dmytro Yatsiv (OUN)
- Secretary of the Ministry of National Economy Roman Ilnytsky (OUN)
- Minister of Agriculture Yevhen Khraplyvy (Ukrainian National-Democratic Party)
- Deputy Minister of Agriculture Andriy Piasetsky (Front of National Unity)
- Minister of Health Markian Panchyshyn (no political affiliation)
- Deputy Minister of Health Roman Osinchuk
- Secretary of the Ministry of Health Oleksandr Barvinsky (no political affiliation)
- Minister of Education Volodymyr Radzykevych (no political affiliation)
- Minister of Communication N. Moroz (no political affiliation)
- Minister of Information Oleksandr Hai-Holovko (no political affiliation)
- Secretary of the Ministry of Information Osyp Pozychaniuk (OUN)
- Secretary of the Ministry of Information Yaroslav Starukh (OUN)
- Minister of Political Coordination Ivan Klymiv-Lehenda (OUN)
- Director of Government Administration Mykhailo Rosliak (Socialist Radical Party)

A Council of Seniors headed by Kost Levytsky as president was also formed.

== Reactions to the proclamation ==
=== Reaction in Ukraine ===
The act of proclamation was broadcast by Yaroslav Stetsko over the radio in Lviv, which made many believe it was supported by the advancing German troops. The act received immediate support from several Ukrainian church officials such as Metropolitan Archbishop Andrey Sheptytsky and Bishop Hryhoriy Khomyshyn of the Ukrainian Greek Catholic Church, Metropolitan Bishop Polikarp Sikorsky of the Ukrainian Autocephalous Orthodox Church.

Apparently convinced that the group of Stetsko had the backing of the Germans, Metropolitan wrote a pastoral letter in which he exhorted the people to support the newly proclaimed government "the sacrifices which the final attainment of our goals require demand above all dutiful obedience to the just orders of the government which do not conflict with God’s law." Moreover, he declared:

We greet the victorious German Army as deliverers from the enemy. We render our obedient homage to the government which has been erected. We recognize Mr.Yaroslav Stetsko as Head of State Administration of Ukraine.

The pastoral letter was read over the radio by chaplain of the Nachtigall Battalion Father Hryn’okh the same morning. It appeared to have removed any doubts which may have been lingering in the mind of most prominent Ukrainians in Lviv concerning the origin of the Stets’ko government.

Supporters of Ukrainian independence have been divided in their assessment of the proclamation. Some considered it brilliant, others considered it reckless or even foolish.

=== Reaction by the German government ===
The Declaration of Independence took the German authorities completely by surprise, and they saw it as an attempted coup. When Nazi troops entered Lviv, the German authorities told the leadership of the Ukrainian government to disband. However, it did not, and in reprisal the leaders of the government were arrested and interned in Sachsenhausen concentration camp. These included President Yaroslav Stetsko, and Stepan Bandera.

Within two years of the declaration, the Nazis had imprisoned or killed 80% of OUN-B leadership.

By an act of June 30, 1941, the Ukrainian people demonstrated to the whole world and to history that they wished to govern their own lives and that they were ready to defend their right to live freely in their own independent state against the imperialist encroachments of every enemy and under all conditions.

— Mirchuk P.,

== See also ==
- Ukrainian liberation movement (1920–1950)

== Sources ==
- Hai-Nyzhnyk P. P. The attitude of senior management of the German Reich to the Act of the Ukrainian state in 1941 and the military-political tactics of the OUN(r) in 1941–1943.– Collection of scientific works "Gileya: scientific bulletin", Kyiv: National Pedagogical University named after MP Drahomanov; VGO Ukrainian Academy of Sciences, 2015.— Issue.98 (No. 7) .— P. 49–65.
