= Arsenal Factory =

Ukrainian arms manufacturing factory

Coordinates: 50.4400°N 30.5422°E

Arsenal Special Device Production State Enterprise
- Type: State-owned company
- Industry: Arms industry
- Founded: 1764 (originally), reestablished in the post-World War II period
- Founder: Russian Empire, Soviet government
- Headquarters: Kyiv, Ukraine
- Key people: Director & Chief Designer Mykola I. Lykholit
- Products: Weapons, armored vehicles, various optics, precision mechanic, cryogenics and electronic products
- Revenue: ▲ ₴ 337 million
- Owner: Ukraine
- Number of employees: 1098
- Parent: National Space Agency of Ukraine
- Website: arsenalcdb.com.ua

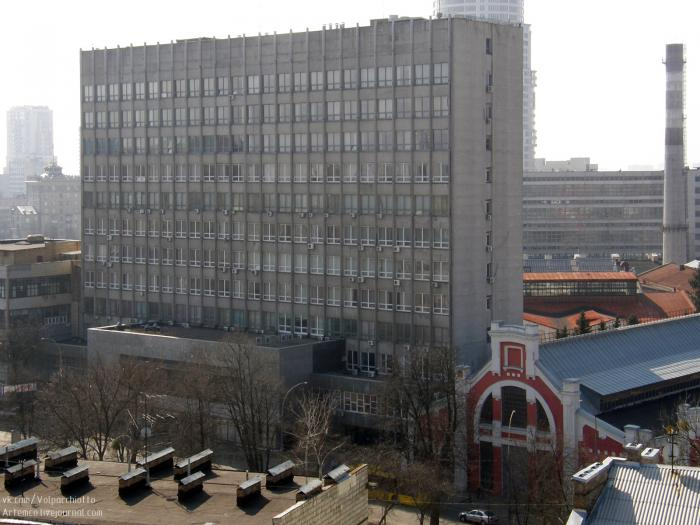
Headquarters of the Arsenal SDP SE.

Arsenal Special Device Production State Enterprise (Ukrainian: Казенне підприємство спеціального приладобудування «Арсенал», romanized: Kazenne pidpryiemstvo spetsialnoho pryladobuduvannya Arsenal), also known as the Arsenal Factory, is one of the oldest factories in Kyiv.

== History ==
=== Pre-1918 ===
The factory was established in 1764 as a repair and production facility of the Imperial Russian Army and the factory was initially based in a Kyiv Fortress compound in the Pechersk (Печерськ) district of the city. Workers at the factory included sniper Lyudmila Pavlichenko, who worked as a grinder at the factory prior to 1941.

=== The Revolution and World War II events ===
On January 29, 1918, the workers of the factory organized an armed pro-Bolshevik mutiny known as a Kiev Arsenal mutiny or a January Rebellion against the Central Rada, the Ukrainian assembly that declared the independence of Ukraine. To commemorate the event, the Soviet authorities preserved the historic defensive wall bearing the traces of shelling (situated on the city's Moskovs'ka Street near the Arsenal'na metro station).

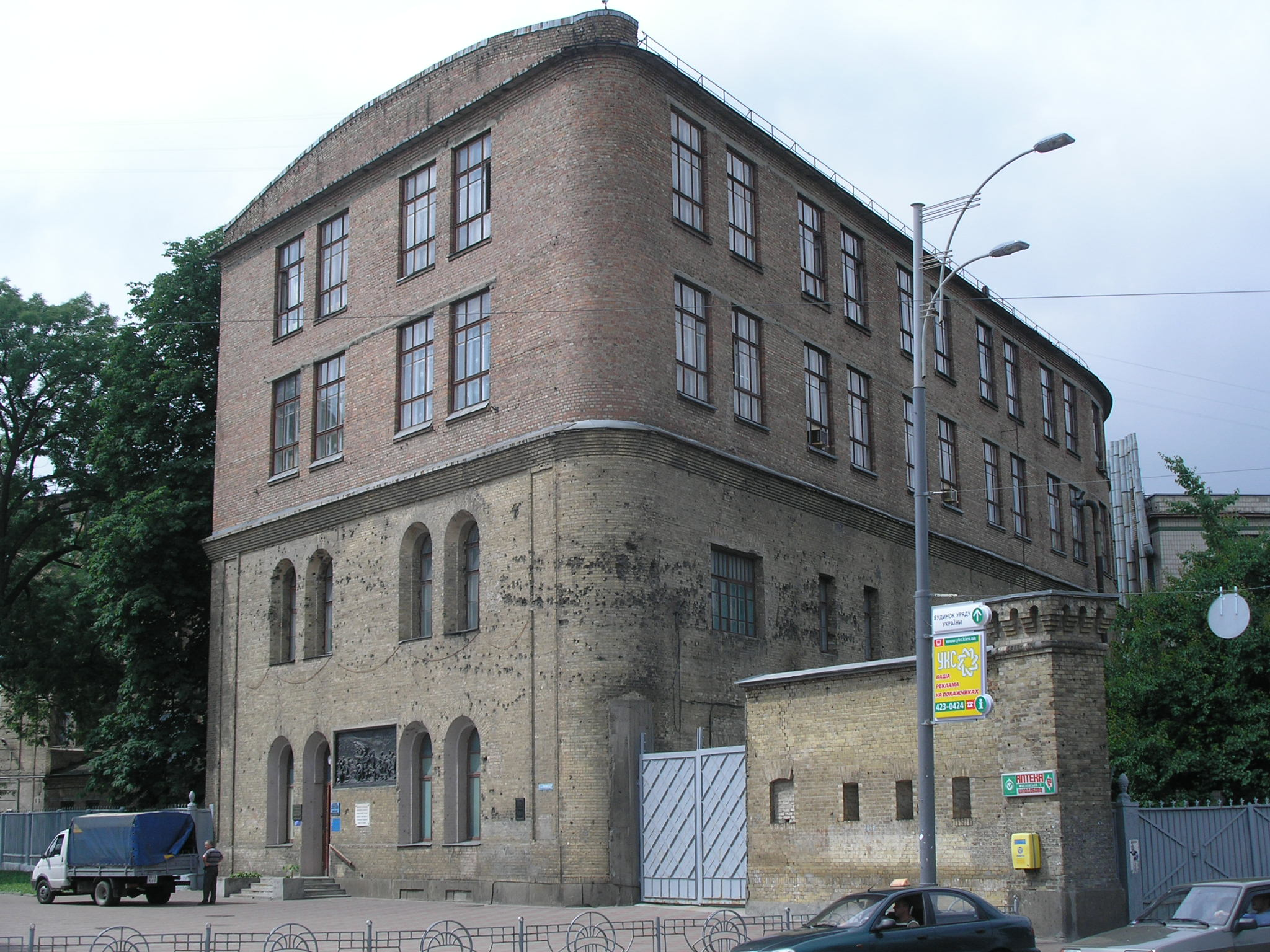
The Kyiv Arsenal Factory, seen with bullet damage during the pro-Bolshevik mutiny when Ukrainian government troops suppressed them.

While civil production lines were added to the factory starting from 1918, the factory produced mostly the military related products throughout its history. In the 1920s, 1930s and during World War II the factory mainly produced artillery, anti-tank, and anti-aircraft guns. In summer 1941, immediately after the outbreak of the war between the Soviet Union and the Axis powers, the factory was quickly evacuated to Perm in the Ural Mountains, far from hostilities. The factory buildings in Kiev suffered heavy damages from German bombings. The relocated "Arsenal" continued to play a major role in arming the Red Army.

=== Post-war ===
After the war, the Arsenal factory was reestablished anew at its Kyiv location and partly converted into a civil company named Zavod Arsenal (while the other, smaller, part remained an unremarkable military repairing facility under a different name). Since that time, the name Arsenal is mostly associated with the larger company rather than with the military one (occupying the oldest building of old arsenal). During the Cold War arms race, Arsenal developed dramatically, becoming an important manufacturer of the military-related products and employing tens of thousands of people. The factory mainly specialized in optical components for the Soviet military and space programs. The factory also produced the professional grade photographic cameras "Kiev" but civil production played only a minor role in factory output. Tens of thousands of people were employed at the "Arsenal."

=== Perestroika and independence ===
After the beginning of perestroika, military orders dropped drastically and the Arsenal factory fell into a crisis which is still ongoing. The management attempted to convert the factory by concentrating more on consumer optics and other civil products, but these attempts did little to help the factory to emerge from the crisis. Comparatively insignificant figures of civil production sales could not support the employment of military-specialized workers in such numbers and maintain the gigantic premises.

Today, control systems, gyroscopes, accelerometers and other products are used to create 'Neptune', 'Vilkha', 'Hrim-2' missiles and missile systems, 'Korsar', 'Stugna' ATGM. Products of the company are used in Ukrainian space program. Civil production includes consumer optics, medical and banking equipment, gauges for the natural gas and optical diode-based traffic lights. In addition, the company performs calculations and manufacturing of optical systems and other products to order.

In 2019, Intergal-Bud construction company bought 1.4 ha or Arsenal Factory and rebuilt one of buildings into an office space.

== Art museum project ==
In 2004, a Ukrainian oligarch and art philanthropist Viktor Pinchuk suggested to establish a modern art gallery in the oldest 19th century building of the Arsenal. This large fortress-like brick structure, situated on the Tsytadel'na Street and recognized as architectural monument, now belongs to the Ukrainian military and is poorly maintained. Later, Viktor Yushchenko, the President of Ukraine, expressed his support to the museum idea but suggested that the museum had to be state-run and dominated by more traditional art pieces in order to become a "Ukrainian Hermitage". The process of converting the building to a civil use succeeded and in 2007 the museum called Art Arsenal (Mystetskyi Arsenal) was officially opened. Nowadays, Art Arsenal (Mystetskyi Arsenal) which is based in some buildings of the Arsenal enterprise, is one of the biggest and most popular art location in Ukraine.

== Product brands ==
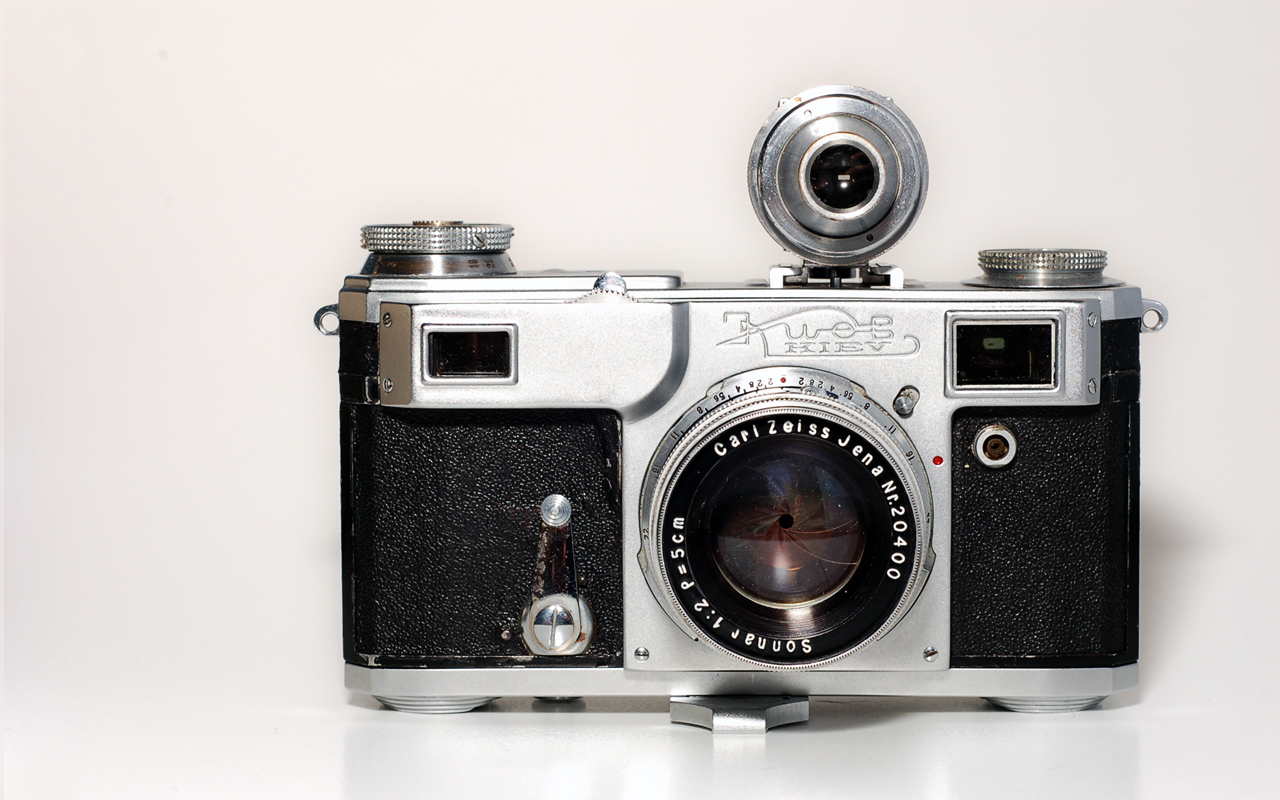
Kiev photo cameras

Photo cameras

- Kiev
- Salyut Cameras

Camera lenses

- Arsat

General

- Fotar

== Notable people ==
- Boryslav Brondukov
- Lyudmila Pavlichenko
- Usher Ayzenberg
- Boris Ayzenberg
