= Lev Rebet =

Ukrainian nationalist and political leader (1912–1957)

- Лев Ребет
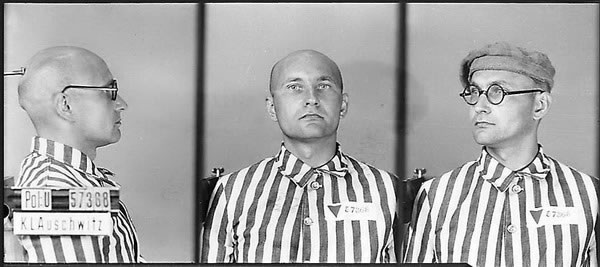
- Lev Rebet in Auschwitz, 1941

Personal details
- Born: 3 March 1912 Stryi, Halychyna, Austria-Hungary
- Died: 12 October 1957 (aged 45) Munich, West Germany
- Cause of death: Assassination by hydrogen cyanide gas
- Party: Organization of Ukrainian Nationalists
- Spouse: Daria Rebet
- Occupation: Politician

Lev Rebet (Ukrainian: Лев Ребет; 3 March 1912 – 12 October 1957) was a Ukrainian politician, journalist, and lawyer. A prominent leader of the Organization of Ukrainian Nationalists (OUN), he served as a cabinet member and acting prime minister in the Ukrainian national government during the proclamation of independence in June 1941.

After the war, Rebet became a leading theorist for the Ukrainian diaspora in West Germany, serving as a professor at the Ukrainian Free University. Initially a close associate of Stepan Bandera, he later co-founded the more moderate Organisation of Ukrainian Nationalists Abroad (OUN-Z) following ideological disagreements. Rebet was assassinated in Munich by KGB agent Bohdan Stashynsky using a specialized cyanide spray gun; his death was initially attributed to natural causes until his assassin defected to the West in 1961.

== Early life ==
Rebet was born in Stryi in Western Ukraine, to a Ukrainian father and a mother of Jewish origins. His father was a postal official. Rebet was both deeply religious as a Byzantine-rite Catholic and very physically active from an early age. He was a member of "Plast", the Ukrainian scout organization.

Rebet attended the Stryi Gymnasium, which offered parallel Ukrainian classes, and joined the Ukrayinska Viyskova Orhanizatsiya, UVO (Ukrainian Military Organization; Ukrainian: Українська Військова Організація) at age 17. Soon after its founding in 1929, he became an active member of the Organization of Ukrainian Nationalists, the OUN (Ukrainian: Організація Українських Націоналістів), whose activities at that time were mainly focused against the Polonisation efforts of the Warsaw government in eastern Galicia.

== Early political career ==
Rebet became a key writer and thinker in the OUN, quickly rising to the rank of "Holova Krayovoyi Ekzekutyvy" (Regional Commander, Ukrainian: Провідник Крайової Екзекутиви), a post which he held from 1934 to 1938. He was repeatedly arrested by the Polish government and spent two and a half years in Polish prisons in Stryi and Lviv.

When the OUN split in 1940 into OUN-Melnyk and OUN-Bandera, Rebet joined the OUN-Bandera group.

=== 30 June 1941 ===
On 30 June 1941, when the OUN proclaimed independence in Wehrmacht-occupied Lviv (renamed "Lemberg" until late 1944), Rebet became the deputy prime minister of the Ukrainian government, appointed by the prime minister Yaroslav Stetsko.

The German occupying forces did not recognise the OUN move for independence. They successively arrested Bandera and Stetsko, leading to Lev Rebet briefly becoming acting prime minister of the Ukrainian national government.

=== Arrest and internment by the Nazis ===
In August 1941, Rebet was himself arrested by the Gestapo. He spent the next three years in the Sachsenhausen concentration camp in Zellenbau; a section where political prisoners were kept. After the war, he moved to Munich in the American occupation zone, then a centre of the Ukrainian diaspora.

== Publications and political views ==
Rebet continued his political activity in exile with a varied number of publications. He worked as the editor of multiple Ukrainian-language periodicals and took up research and scholarship in the fields of law, politics and sociology. In 1949, he completed his doctoral dissertation and was appointed Professor of State Law at the Ukrainian Free University. His major academic works included "The Formation of the Ukrainian Nation" (1951) and "The Theory of Nations" (1956). On the editorial pages of the Ukrainian Independist, he also engaged critically with the OUN, its wartime activities and current direction. On his former associate Bandera, for instance, he wrote:

He [Bandera] was arrested in 1934 and afterwards he never returned to Ukraine: apart from a brief period in 1940 and 1941 he had no direct connection with the organization, being as he was either in prison, or in a concentration camp, or in exile abroad. However, for a whole series of reasons, it is his name (mainly after the OUN split in 1940...) that turned out to be most closely associated with the history of the organization, much more closely than the work he contributed to it could really justify.

In 1956, this eventually led to a split between Bandera's OUN-B and the more moderate OUN-Z, jointly led by Rebet and Zinoviy Matla.

== Assassination ==
He was assassinated on 12 October 1957 in Munich by a KGB agent, Bohdan Stashynsky, using a hydrogen cyanide atomizer mist gun. After Rebet was assassinated, his widow Daria Rebet and his colleague Bohdan Kordiuk, who succeeded him as editor of the "Ukrainian Independentist", continued his work.

Stashynsky would go on to assassinate Rebet's associate Stepan Bandera by similar means in 1959.

== Aftermath ==
Rebet's death was at first believed to have been from natural causes. However, Stashynsky defected to West Berlin in 1961, voluntarily surrendered and testified to the West German prosecution. Explaining what motivated him to kill Rebet, Stashynsky told a court that he had been told that Rebet was "the leading theorist of the Ukrainians in exile". According to West German Intelligence chief Reinhard Gehlen,

...Bohdan Stashinskyi, who had been persuaded by his German-born wife Inge to confess to the crimes and take the load off his troubled conscience, stuck resolutely to his statements. His testimony convinced the investigating authorities. He reconstructed the crimes exactly as they had happened, revisiting the crumbling business premises at the Stachus, in the heart of Munich, where Lev Rebet had entered the office of a Ukrainian exile newspaper, his suitcase in his hand. And he showed how the hydrogen cyanide capsule had exploded in Rebet's face and how he had left him slumped over the rickety staircase. The case before the Federal court began on October 8, 1962, and world interest in the incident was revived. Passing sentence eleven days later, the court identified Stashinskyi's unscrupulous employer Shelyepin as the person primarily responsible for the hideous murders, and the defendant -- who had given a highly credible account of the extreme pressure applied to him by the KGB to act as he did -- received a comparatively mild sentence. He served most of it and was released...

== Legacy ==
The short film Critical Condition, inspired by the life and death of Rebet, premiered at Cannes in 2025.

== Sources ==
- Symon Petliura, Yevhen Konovalets, Stepan Bandera - Three Leaders of Ukrainian Liberation Movement murdered by the Order of Moscow. Ukrainian Publishers Limited. 237, Liverpool Road, London, United Kingdom. 1962. (audiobook).
- (In Russian) Chuyev, Sergei - Ukrainskyj Legion - Moscow, 2006
- (In Ukrainian) Encyclopedia of Ukraine - Munich, 1973, Vol. 7p. 2475
- The Ukrainian Weekly
