= Kiev Arsenal January Uprising =

Bolshevik-organized workers revolt (1918)

January Uprising
- Part of the Ukrainian–Soviet War
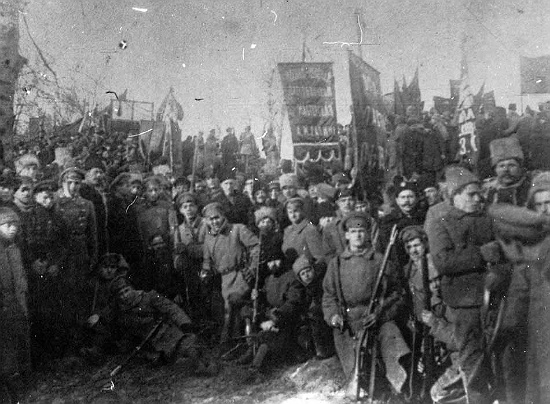
- Participants of the January Uprising in Kiev
Date	29 January [O.S. 16 January] – 4 February [O.S. 22 January] 1918
Location	Kiev
Result	UPR victory: Bolshevik uprising suppressed; Start of the Battle of Kiev

Belligerents
Ukrainian People's Republic: Polish Military Organisation	(Russian Soviet Federative Socialist Republic) Bolsheviks; Red Guards

Commanders and leaders
Mykhailo Hrushevsky (president of Central Rada); Government forces: Mykhailo Kovenko; Symon Petliura; Yevhen Konovalets; Vsevolod Petriv; Petro Bolbochan POW: (Second Polish Republic) Leopold Lis-Kula (Note: Commander of the POW in Kiev.)	Bolshevik Revkom: Syla Mishchenko; Yan Gamarnik; Mykola Kostyuk; Oleksandr Horvits †

Strength
2,000	2,200; 2 armoured cars

Casualties and losses
Unknown	Up to 750 killed

The Kiev Arsenal January Uprising (Ukrainian: Січневе повстання, romanized: Sichneve povstannya), sometimes simply called the January Uprising or the January Rebellion, was a Bolshevik-organized armed workers' revolt that started on 29 January [O.S. 16 January] 1918, at the Arsenal Factory in Kiev during the Ukrainian–Soviet War. The goal of the uprising was to sabotage the ongoing elections to the Ukrainian Constituent Assembly and to support the advancing Red Army. The forces of the Ukrainian People's Republic (UPR) managed to quell the uprising by 4 February [O.S. 22 January] 1918.

== The beginning ==
=== Start of the Ukrainian-Soviet War ===
On 25 December 1917 Bolsheviks in Kharkiv proclaimed the establishment of the Ukrainian People's Republic of Soviets and declared the Central Rada to be illegitimate. As a consequence, two centres of power emerged in Ukraine: the Central Rada in Kyiv and the Soviet government in Kharkiv.

On 7 January 1918 Bolshevik troops started an open invasion of Ukraine. After establishing control over the Left-bank part of the country, a 9,000-strong force commanded by Mikhail Muravyov started an offensive against Kyiv. The long-anticipated 1918 Ukrainian Constituent Assembly election was held on 9 January 1918. The Bolsheviks won only 10% of the total votes, but the elections were suspended due to the ongoing Ukrainian-Soviet War as practically all of left-bank Ukraine was occupied by the Soviet forces headed by Vladimir Antonov-Ovseyenko. According to the Third Declaration (Universal), the Constituent Assembly was planned to meet on 22 January, but this was postponed until the end of military conflict. On 19 January, the Soviet government dissolved the Russian Constituent Assembly, while just a day prior, the government state security forces (Cheka) opened fire on a peace demonstration in support of the constituent assembly. On 22 January, another peace demonstration in Moscow was dispersed by gunfire as well.

=== Background for the revolt ===
The Socialist Central Rada in Kyiv suffered from lack of popular support, as its policies were widely seen as inconsequential. Kyiv's working classes were generally hostile to the government, while many members of the intelligentsia were discouraged due to the Rada's rhetorics being ideologically similar to the Bolsheviks. Meanwhile the army was falling apart due to mass desertions, with the remaining staff being unreliable and susceptible to Bolshevik propaganda. In late December Mykola Shynkar, the Socialist commander of Kiev Military District, refused to provide quarters for the Republican Regiment commanded by Petro Bolbochan, blaming the unit of being "reactionary".

Upon learning about Muravyov's advance on Kyiv, the city's Bolsheviks decided not to waste any more time and started planning a revolt in order to support the invading Soviet forces in cooperation with Left SRs. They decided to initiate it once the Soviet forces started to approach the city in order to draw away some of the Ukrainian military forces from the front lines and help the Red Army to advance. The Bolsheviks had used this tactic in other Ukrainian cities, such as Katerynoslav (current Dnipro), Odessa, Mykolaiv, and Yelizavetgrad (current Kropyvnytskyi). The Arsenal Factory was chosen to be the center of the riot.

Initially, no serious measures were taken by the Central Rada government to prevent the uprising. The situation in Kyiv was becoming increasingly tense amid the continuing advance of Bolshevik troops on the city. As a result, anti-Bolshevik officers were inclined to act on their own account. On 7 January unknown soldiers kidnapped Leonid Pyatakov, the leader of Kyiv's Bolsheviks, from his own flat. The Central Rada reacted and ordered an immediate investigation of the case, which failed to bring any results.

To prevent possible riots, on 18 January a few platoons of the Free Cossacks commanded by Mykhailo Kovenko entered the territory of the Arsenal Factory, where the Bolsheviks were gathering, and confiscated a great amount of weaponry, arresting several Communist activists. The Kievan Bolsheviks' propaganda newspaper, Golos Sotsial-Demokrata, was shut down along with several other publications. Because of damage to the equipment, Arsenal stopped its operations, and authorities planned to confiscate the coal ore in order to completely shut down the factory.

On 22 January the Central Rada issued the Fourth Universal, officially declaring Ukraine's full independence. This event encouraged the Bolsheviks to intensify their preparations for the uprising.

On 28 January, a general assembly of workers at the Arsenal issued a protest against the military authorities' decision to confiscate all coal from the factory. The protest was met with general sympathy from the employees, and this fact was used by Bolshevik agitators. The factory committee approved a decision not to accept the authorities' demands and decreed to provide weapons to the workers.

On the same day, a meeting between representatives of the Kyiv Committee of the Russian Social Democratic Party (Bolsheviks), the local Soviet and workers of the Arsenal Factory was organized on the premises of Kyiv Commercial Institute. The Arsenal delegation proposed to initiate a revolt with the aim of deposing the Central Rada and establishing Soviet power in the city. Members of the Shevchenko Regiment, Sahaidachnyi Marines Kurin and several other military units present at the meeting promised to support the uprising. A revolutionary committee was established in order to coordinate the operation.

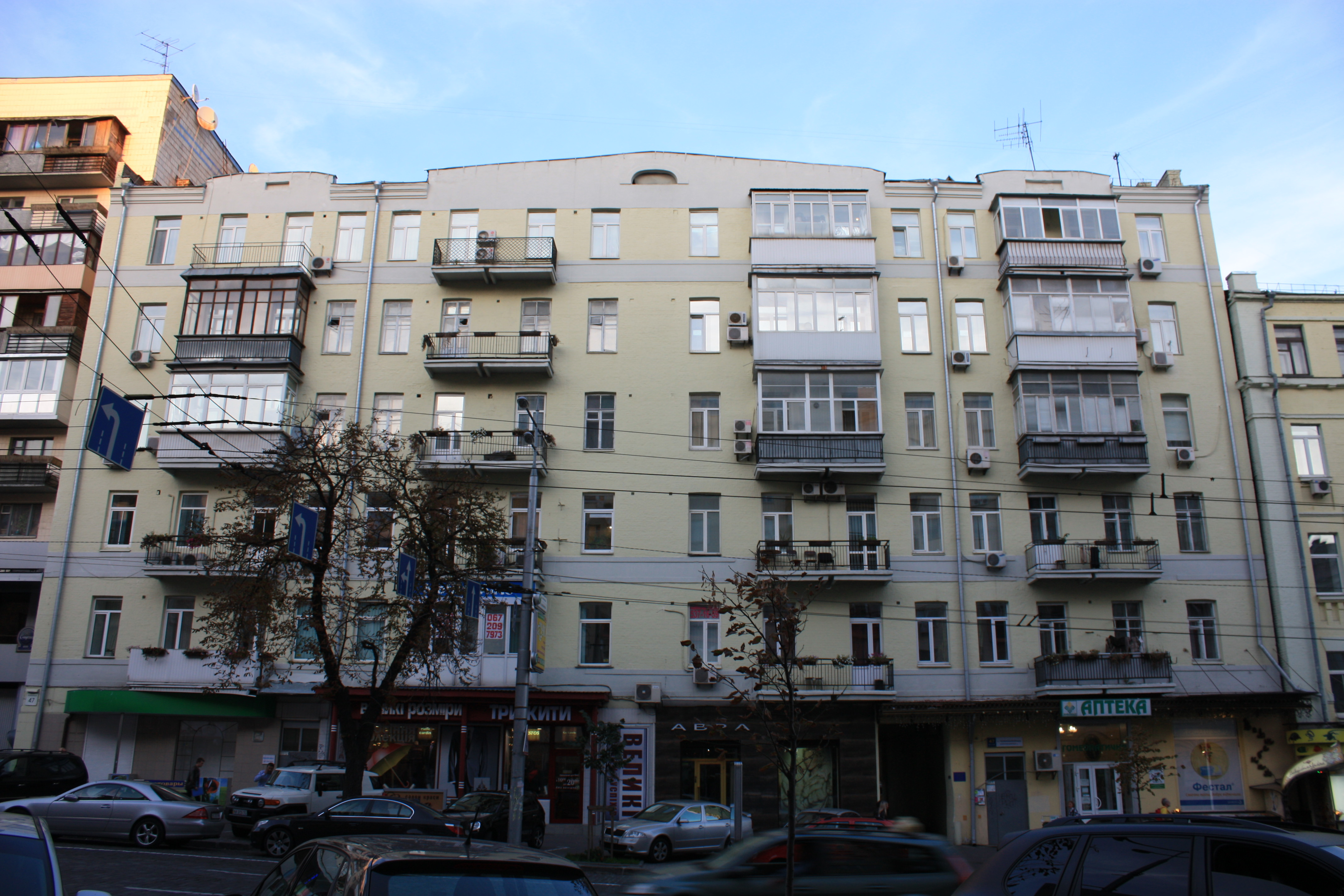
Modern view of the building in which the rebels' headquarters was located

Soldiers of the Shevchenko Regiment, who were guarding the warehouse with ammunition confiscated from the Arsenal, managed to retrieve the weapons to the factory. There they were joined by staff captain Syla Mishchenko, one of the commanding officers of Sahaidachnyi Kurin and a member of the Bolshevik Party. Mishchenko became the commandant of the factory and would head a military force of 1,500 workers and soldiers during the uprising.

Kyiv's Bolshevik leaders Jan Hamarnyk, Andriy Ivanov, Isaac Kreisberg, and others, who had been planning to delay the uprising until the Red Army would come closer to Kiev, had no other choice but to follow it. The headquarters of the revolt were established at 47 Velyka Vasylkivska Street.

== Participants ==
Aerial view of Kyiv's Pechersk district in 1918, with Arsenal factory visible on central right

Aerial view of Demiivka neighbourhood in 1918

=== Bolsheviks ===
- 1st battalion (kurin) of Sahaidachny Regiment (Syla Mishchenko)
- Several units of Bohdanivsky battalion (kurin) (Kysel)
- Units of Shevchenko Regiment (warrant officer A. Port)
- Red Guards units of Arsenal Factory
- Red Guards units of Demiivka artillery factory (Vasyl Bozhenko)

=== Central Rada ===
- Sich Riflemen battalion (kurin) (Yevhen Konovalets)
  - 2nd platoon (sotnia) – 200 soldiers
  - Machine-gun platoon (sotnia) – 150 soldiers
  - Reserve platoon (sotnia) – 100 soldiers
  - Artillery battery – 12 guns
- Free Cossacks units
- Haidamaka Brigade of Sloboda Ukraine (kish) (Symon Petlyura)
  - Black Haidamaka Battalion (kurin)
  - Red Haidamaka Battalion (kurin), also known as 3rd Haidamaka Regiment (Omelian Volokh)
  - 1st platoon (of Sich Riflemen battalion) – 200 soldiers
- Hordiyenko Regiment (Vsevolod Petriv)
- Some armored trains

== Revolt ==
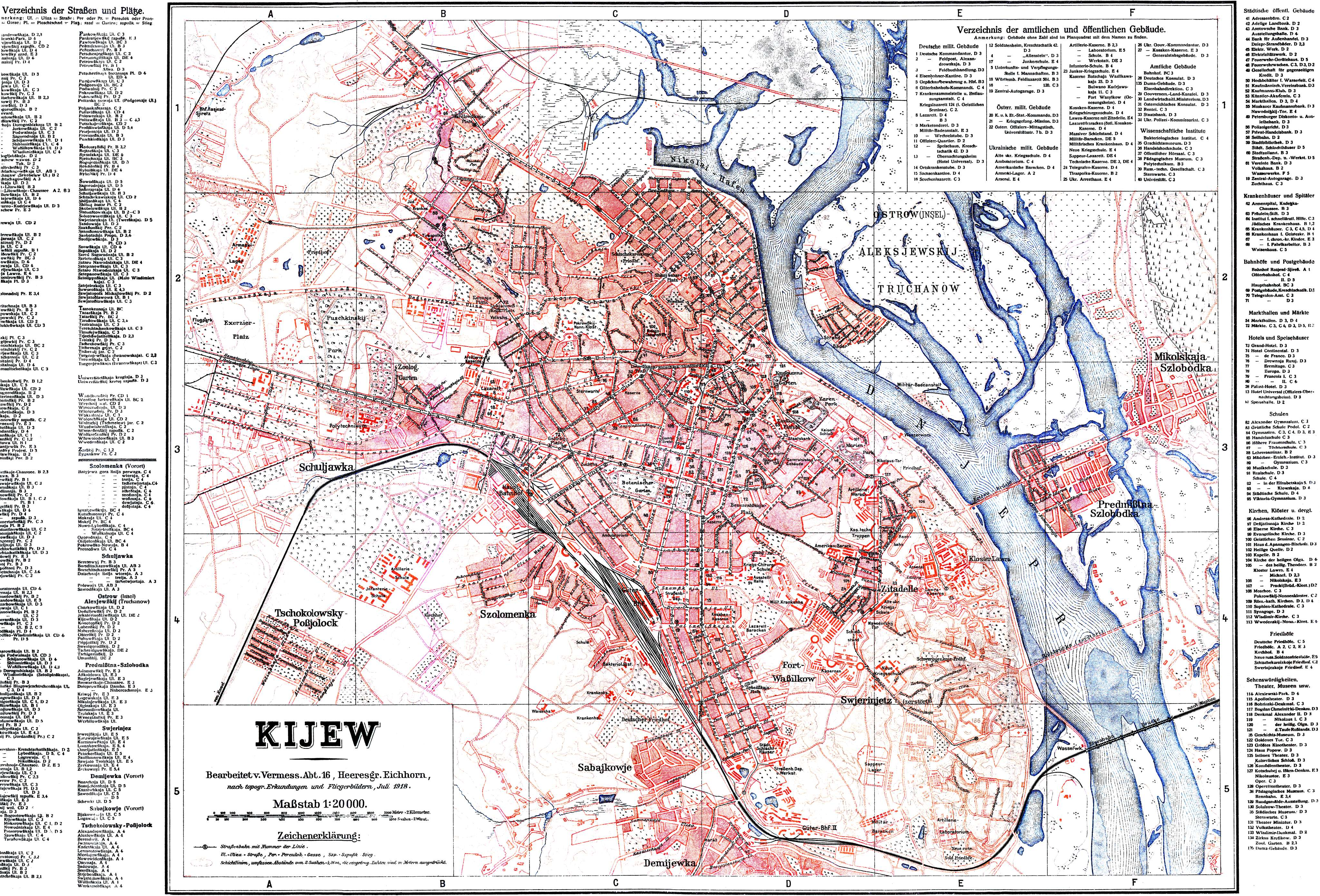
A German-produced city plan of Kyiv from 1918. Arsenal factory (marked as Artillerie-Werkst(att)) is on central right, Podil on top, Shuliavka (Schuljawka) on central left and Demiivka (Demijewka) in the lower part of the map; the freight station (Güter-Bhf.) is below from the centre.

In the night between 28 and 29 January, a group of pro-Bolshevik soldiers from Sahaidachnyi Kurin captured the Arsenal Factory. The insurgents were joined by workers from the main workshop of Southwestern Railways, as well as revolutionary soldiers from the Bohdan Regiment, Shevchenko Regiment and several other units. The total strength of the Bolshevik force reached 2,200 men and 2 armoured cars. Main forces of the rebels were concentrated around the Arsenal in Pechersk district, but their groups were also active in Podil, Shuliavka and Demiivka.

In the morning of 29 January, representatives of the Kiev Soviet issued an ultimatum to the Central Rada, demanding that it transfer its power to the Soviets and disarm the armed units under its command. The Rada refused and demanded the insurgents' capitulation. Sporadic clashes and shootouts began around the city.

After taking control over the Kyiv cargo railway station, the rebel forces advanced in the direction of Kyiv's central district located around Velyka Vasylkivska and Khreshchatyk streets. At the same time, a group of 250 Bolshevik supporters advancing from Podil captured the Old Kyiv police station at Sofiiska Square and Hotel Prague at Volodymyrska Street, not far from the Central Rada Building. However, various insurgent units lacked a centralized command and acted without coordination, which made them unable to establish firm control over the city.

In the evening of 29 January Kiev Soviet, the Central Bureau of Trade Unions and the Council of Factory Committees held a joint meeting, during which Bolshevik representative Isaak Kreisberg informed the audience that the mutilated body of Leonid Pyatakov, who had been kidnapped three weeks earlier, was found near the Post-Volynsky railway station. The news triggered the beginning of a political strike, and a revolutionary committee headed by Andriy Ivanov was elected. On 30 January, Kyiv's water supplies, power plant and public transportation ceased their operations as part of the strike. The chaotic situation was exacerbated by lack of goods and public disorder in the streets.

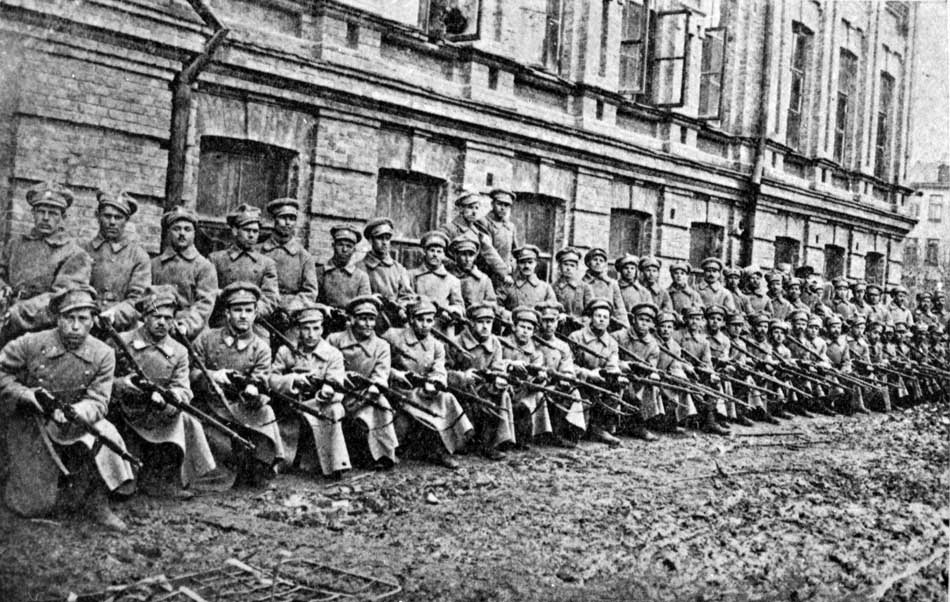
Sich Riflemen in the streets of Kyiv

The Rada had no influence over most of the military units, many of which decided not to intrude. The Ukrainian government was supported only by the separate platoons of the Bohdan, Doroshenko, Polubotok, Bohun, Republican Regiments, elements of the Sich Riflemen commanded by Yevhen Konovalets and the Free Cossacks. The units suffered from a lack of ammunition and lacked a unified command. As a result, initial attempts to restore government control over the Arsenal Factory were defeated.

On 30-31 January forces of the Republican Regiment under command of Bolbochan managed to stop the Bolshevik advance in Podil, capturing two cannons, an armoured car, a mortar, several machine guns and numerous rifles. Most of the civilian population was not involved in the clashes, observing the fights with apathy.

== Storming of the Arsenal ==
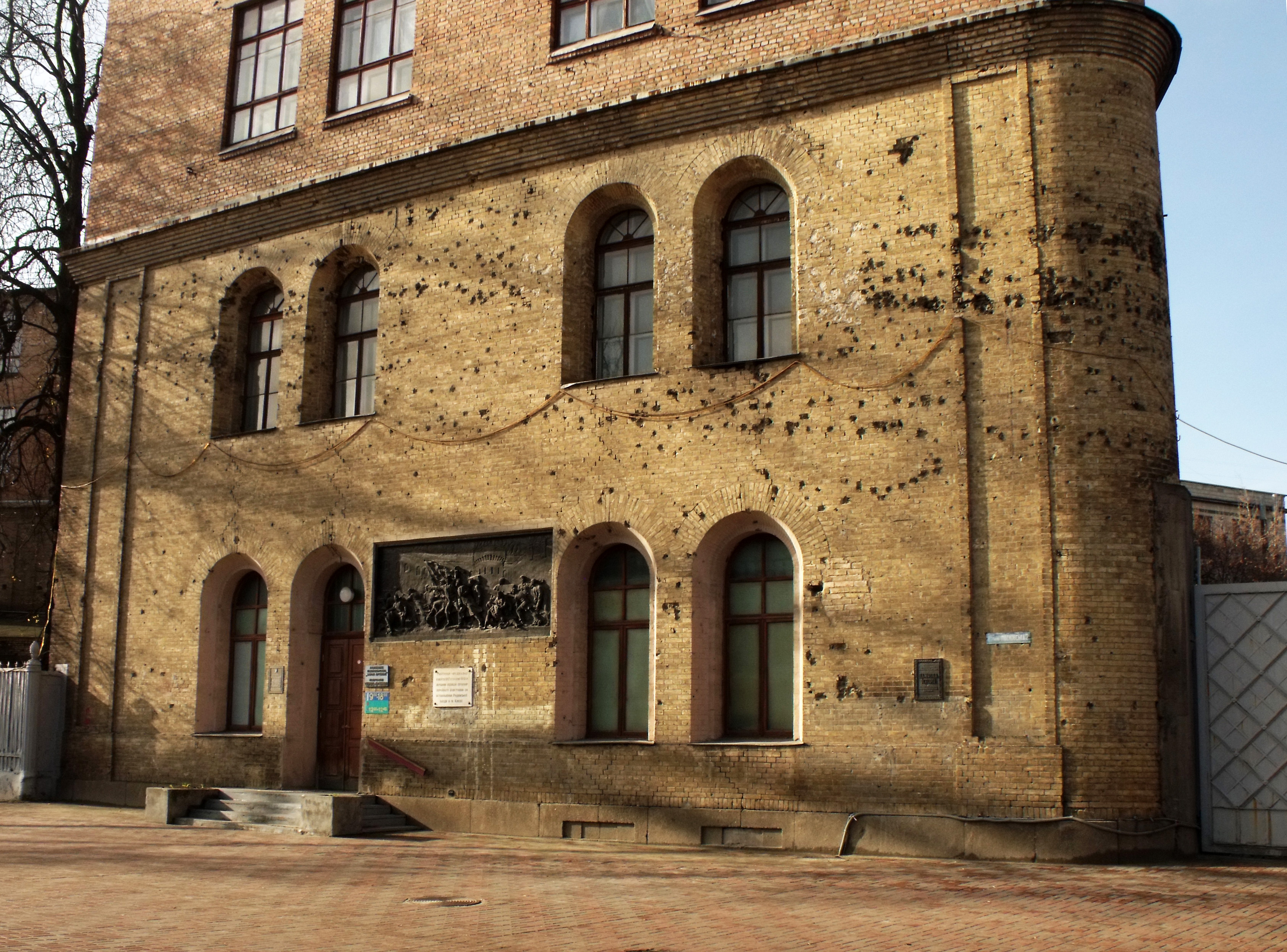
Building of the Arsenal Factory, with traces of bullets from the revolt still visible

1 February saw the situation change in favour of the Central Rada: after retreating from the front in face of the advance by Muravyov's forces, units of the Haidamak Kish and 1st Sich Riflemen sotnia, commanded respectively by Symon Petliura and Roman Sushko, arrived to Kyiv and on the same day joined forces with the Hordiyenko Regiment under command of Vsevolod Petriv, who moved into the city from the Northern Front. As a result, the forces of Central Rada grew to 2,000 men, almost equalling the Bolshevik force.

On 1 February, the Rada announced that it had full control of the city's key institutions and called on workers to end the strike, promising socioeconomic reforms. On the next day, most of the city was cleared of insurgents by the Ukrainian People's Army, with the Arsenal Factory and the railway workshops remaining the only hotbeds of resistance. After the Central Rada established contact with the factory committee, negotiations started between its members and Bolshevik representatives, who were promised immunity. However, when the delegation of insurgents arrived for talks at the Mariinskyi Palace on the evening of 2 February, they were put under arrest by soldiers of the Doroshenko regiment, although their leader Mishchenko was later able to flee.

In the morning of 3 February Petliura's forces started the assault against the Arsenal Factory, and by the evening managed to penetrate its territory. Clashes in workshops continued until the next morning, when resistance was finally suppressed. On the same day insurgents at the railway workshops also gave up, and rebels at other locations were neutralized.

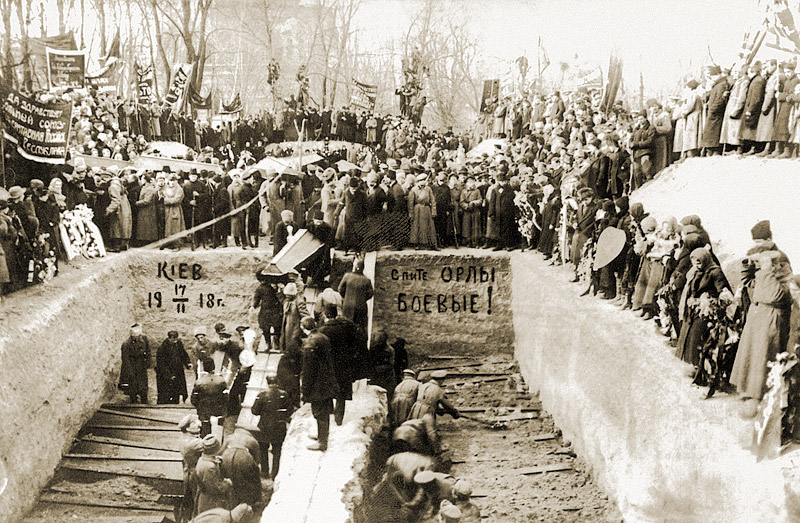
Funeral of the victims of the uprising on 17 February

Despite the eventual victory of government forces, the defeat of the uprising couldn't influence the general course of the ongoing war. On the same day when the Arsenal revolt was suppressed, Muravyov's forces approached Kyiv and started shelling the city with heavy artillery. On 5 February Bolshevik troops began storming the city, which fell to them three days later.

== Casualties ==
No definite information about the number of victims during the January battles in Kyiv exists. According to Soviet data, up to 1500 people died, with 750 being allegedly executed after the suppression of the uprising. Ukrainian sources deny that mass shootings of prisoners took place in the aftermath of the revolt.

== Commemoration and legacy ==
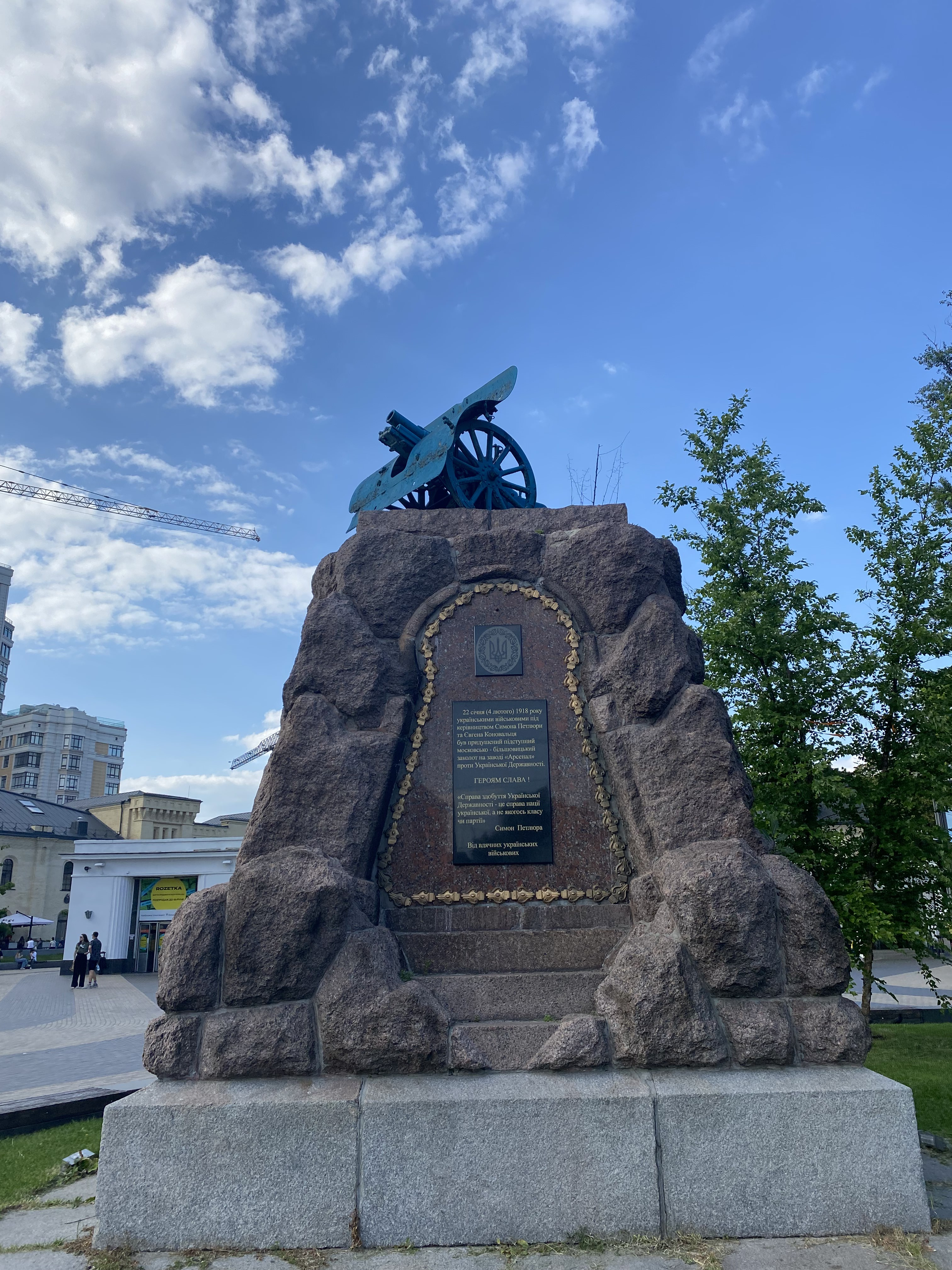
A monument to the Arsenal uprising in front of Arsenalna metro station, with the new text commemorating Ukrainian forces who suppressed the revolt, 2023

On 17 February 1918, around 750 victims of the uprising were buried in a common grave in Kyiv's Mariinskyi Park. It is likely that civilian victims of the shelling and takeover of the city by Muravyov's forces were also included in that number. During the era of Communist rule over Kyiv the burial place attained a sacral status.

This event is generally regarded as "class-motivated" by historians, similar to other workers' movements in the post-October Revolution period.

To commemorate the event, the historic defensive wall of the Arsenal Factory bearing the traces of shelling was preserved by Soviet authorities on the city's Moskovska Street (near the Arsenalna metro station). The nearby street named for the event during Soviet times carried the name "January Uprising Street" until 2007.

The uprising is the subject of Arsenal (1929), a Soviet war film by the Ukrainian director Oleksandr Dovzhenko. Events of the revolt are included into a novel by Ukrainian writer Yuriy Smolych, which was later turned into a film by Isaak Shmaruk.

== See also ==
- Kiev Bolshevik Uprising
