= Bogdan Stashinsky =

Soviet Ukrainian former KGB agent and spy

Bohdan Stashynsky
- Богдан Сташинський
- B. N. Stashynsky
- Born: 4 November 1931; Barszczowice, Poland
- Died: Unknown
- Occupations: Intelligence agent, Assassin
- Years active: 1950–1961
- Employer: KGB
- Known for: Murder of Lev Rebet and Stepan Bandera

Bohdan Mykolayovych Stashynsky (Ukrainian: Богда́н Микола́йович Сташи́нський; born 4 November 1931) or Bogdan Nikolayevich Stashinsky (Russian: Богдáн Николáевич Сташи́нский) was a former Soviet spy who assassinated the Ukrainian nationalist leaders Lev Rebet and Stepan Bandera in the late 1950s. He defected to West Berlin in 1961.

== Early life ==
Born to a family of villagers in Barszowice near Lwów in the Second Polish Republic, Stashynsky completed his early education in 1948 and studied to become a teacher. His family were supporters of the Ukrainian Insurgent Army (UPA). Stashynsky's three sisters were members of the organization. In 1950, Stashynsky was arrested for travelling without a ticket on public transportation to Lviv from his village. After agreeing to act as an informer, he was released. Through his sisters, he infiltrated the workings of the UPA and forwarded the information to the MGB.

In 1953, Stashynsky was sent to Kiev to continue studies in espionage. In 1954, he was sent to East Germany under the name Josef Lehmann where he perfected his knowledge of German. In 1956, Stashynsky often travelled to Munich, West Germany, where he began to perfect his false identity.

== Assassinations ==
Stashynsky received the instructions to carry out the assassination directly from the headquarters of the KGB in Moscow. At that time, Alexander Shelepin was the KGB chairman. The assassination was also known to and approved by Nikita Khrushchev, the then leader and premier of the Soviet Union.

In 1957, the KGB trained the 25-year-old Stashynsky to use a spray gun that fired a jet of poison gas from a crushed cyanide capsule. The gas was designed to induce cardiac arrest, making the victim's death look like a heart attack. Stashynsky used the weapon to kill Lev Rebet in 1957. On 15 October 1959, he used an improved version of the same gas gun to assassinate Stepan Bandera in Munich.

Stashynsky was honoured by Moscow with the Order of the Red Banner by Shelepin for his work and given his final assignment to kill Yaroslav Stetsko. Stetsko, also living in Munich, was a prominent anti-Soviet Ukrainian leader and also the president of the Anti-Bolshevik Bloc of Nations. He was to be assassinated in 1960; it could not be perpetrated for reasons which have not been clarified.

== Defection and arrest ==
Stashynsky met and fell in love with an East German woman, Inge Pohl, in 1957. At first his bosses tried to persuade him not to marry a foreigner, but he persisted. The KGB allowed him to marry her on condition that Pohl become a Soviet citizen and KGB agent. Although he was unhappy with the arrangement, Stashynsky nevertheless agreed as it was the only way he could marry Pohl. After they were married, the KGB bugged their Moscow apartment and heard them express anti-Soviet sentiments. The KGB would not let the couple travel abroad together out of fear of defection, which the couple was indeed planning.

In 1961, Inge returned to East Berlin to give birth to their son, Peter, but Stashynsky was unable to visit them. In August, Peter suddenly developed a fever and died at four months old. The KGB relented after the family tragedy and allowed him to travel to East Berlin for the baby's funeral. Against KGB orders, Stashynsky took his Joseph Lehmann identity card with him to East Germany, as well as other documents that would confirm his identity as a KGB agent. On 13 August 1961, hours before their son's funeral, Stashynsky and his wife fled on foot from her parents’ home in Dallgow, walking to the town of Falkensee to avoid any KGB agents that would intercept them at the Dallgow train station. They took a taxi to East Berlin, where Stashynsky used the Lehmann identity card at a checkpoint. They then traveled to West Berlin via train, where he defected to U.S. officials at a police station.

The CIA was suspicious of Stashynsky, who was flown to Frankfurt for interrogation and doubtful of his claims that he had assassinated Rebet and Bandera. The CIA was unaware that Rebet had been murdered, and Stashynsky's account of his assassination of Bandera was inconsistent with what the U.S. knew of his death. The CIA had concluded that Bandera had been poisoned by someone close to him, and Stashynsky's claim of shooting him with a poison spray gun seemed farfetched. They concluded that Stashynsky "would not be valuable operationally as a double agent, that he was not a bona fide defector and the individual he purported to be." After three weeks, the CIA – believing Stashynsky to be useless – handed him over to West German authorities, who now began to investigate him for the two murders. At first, the West German police were also suspicious of his stories, but after interrogation and visits to the two murder sites, where Stashynsky re-enacted the killings, authorities determined that Stashynsky was telling the truth.

After Stashynsky's defection, the Soviet government tried to avert negative exposure. On 13 October 1961, the Soviet Union arranged a press conference in East Berlin where Soviet agent Stefan Lippolz blamed the murder on the cashier of Bandera's own organization, Dmytro Myskiv, who had since died; however, it was established that Myskiv was not in Munich when Bandera was assassinated but was in Rome at the time. Stashynsky was put on trial for the two murders in October 1962, and sentenced to eight years in prison. In accordance with German law, because he acted on the directions of others, Stashinskyi was legally an accessory to his own crime. In German law, there is no minimum and maximum penalty for assisting a crime. Getting good-time credit, he served four years and was released. Explaining what motivated him to kill Rebet, Stashynsky told a court that he had been told that Rebet was "the leading theorist of the Ukrainians in exile", since "in his newspapers Suczasna Ukrayina (Contemporary Ukraine), Czas (Time), and Ukrayinska Trybuna (Ukrainian Tribune) he not so much provided accounts of daily events as developed primarily ideological issues." According to West German intelligence chief Reinhard Gehlen,

... Bohdan Stashinskyi, who had been persuaded by his German-born wife Inge to confess to the crimes and take the load off his troubled conscience, stuck resolutely to his statements. His testimony convinced the investigating authorities. He reconstructed the crimes exactly as they had happened, revisiting the crumbling business premises at the Stachus, in the heart of Munich, where Lev Rebet had entered the office of a Ukrainian exile newspaper, his suitcase in his hand. And he showed how the hydrogen cyanide capsule had exploded in Rebet's face and how he had left him slumped over the rickety staircase. The case before the Federal court began on [8 October] 1962, and world interest in the incident was revived. Passing sentence eleven days later, the court identified Stashinskyi's unscrupulous employer Shelyepin as the person primarily responsible for the hideous murders, and the defendant – who had given a highly credible account of the extreme pressure applied to him by the KGB to act as he did – received a comparatively mild sentence. He served most of it and was released. Today the KGB's 'torpedo' is living as a free man somewhere in the world he chose on that day in the summer of 1961, a few days before the wall was erected across Berlin.

== Release from prison and later life ==
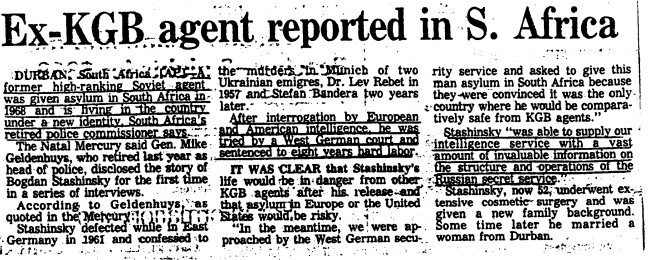
Article on Bohdan Stashynsky asylum in South Africa that appeared on the Chicago Tribune in 1984.

In 1967, Stashynsky was released from prison early on parole and was reportedly handed over to the CIA. Inge divorced Stashynsky in 1964, before he was released.

According to the historian of the Soviet state security organs Boris Volodarsky, after Stashynsky was released from prison, he underwent plastic surgery.

Both Stashynsky and his former wife were given new identities. In 1984, it was reported that Stashynsky had received asylum in South Africa, "the only country where he would be comparatively safe from KGB agents", in the words of the Chicago Tribune. Still living under an alias, it was also reported that he had undegone plastic surgery, and had married a woman from Durban.

Having masterfully covered his tracks, Stashynsky's further fate and date of death are unknown.

== See also ==
- List of Eastern Bloc defectors
