= Marian Hluszkewycz =

Marian Hlushkevych (Polish: Marian Hłuszkewycz,Ukrainian: Маріян Глушкевич, 1877–1935) was a poet from Lviv, Galicia (now Ukraine), who wrote in Russian and Ukrainian languages.

== Biography ==
In his youth, Hlushkevych belonged to the Moscophile movement. After finishing the Law Faculty of Lviv University, he worked as a lawyer. During the First World War Hlushkevych worked in the Russian military administration in Przemyśl, and fled to Russia during the retreat of Russian armies. After staying for some time in Kyiv, he moved to Rostov-on-Don and was employed by a local bank. In 1920, after the Bolshevik capture of power Hlyshkevych left Soviet Russia and returned to his native Lviv, which was then part of Poland. For some time he took part in activities of the Secret Ukrainian University established by Ukrainian activists under Polish rule. Until 1928 Hlushkevych also headed the Russophile Kachkovsky Society in Lviv.
