= Marian Panchyshyn =

Ukrainian medical doctor and public figure

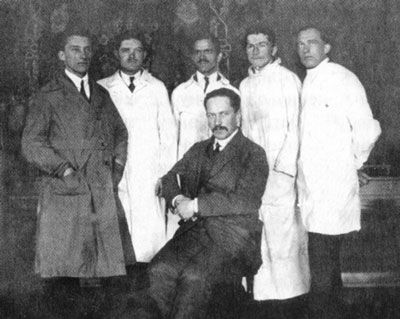
Marian Panchyshyn (sitting) surrounded by colleagues.

Marian Ivanovych Panchyshyn (Ukrainian: Мар'ян Іванович Панчишин; 6 September 1882 – 9 October 1943) was a Ukrainian medical doctor and public figure.

== Biography ==
The son of a coachman, Panchyshyn was born in 1882 in Lviv, then part of Austria-Hungary. Although his family did not have the financial means to allow him to pursue a higher education, he was able to study medicine at the University of Lviv thanks to grants from private foundations. After completing his studies, Panchyshyn was employed as an assistant at the university's anatomy department, and then worked as an assistant at a clinic of internal diseases from 1912. During World War I, he was mobilized as a manager of anti-epidemic hospitals.

Despite coming from a "Polonized" family, Panchyshyn joined the Ukrainian side during the Polish–Ukrainian War of 1918–1919, and established the medical service of the Ukrainian army. In 1919, he opened a private clinic in Lviv; among his patients were Andrey Sheptytsky, the Archbishop of Lviv at the time. He also joined the Shevchenko Scientific Society, and served as rector of the Ukrainian Secret University in 1924–1925. He was also a supporter of the Narodna Lichnytsia hospital established for the poor.

After the annexation of Galicia by the Soviet Union in 1939, Panchyshyn was one of few Ukrainian intellectuals protected by the Soviet authorities. He was elected to the People's Assembly of Western Ukraine, and voted for the inclusion of Galicia in the Ukrainian SSR. After the invasion of the Soviet Union by Nazi Germany in 1941, Panchyshyn was made head of Lviv's medical institute and instructed by the Soviet authorities to evacuate Lviv for the Russian SFSR; despite this, he hid from the Soviets and remained in the city.

After the proclamation of a Ukrainian state in June 1941, Panchyshyn was appointed Minister of Health in Yaroslav Stetsko's collaborationist Ukrainian national government. After the Germans dissolved the government in July the same year, he was made head of the clinic of the medical institute in Lviv. Panchyshyn also worked to restore the medical faculty of the University of Lviv during World War II; although the German occupiers had severely restricted access to higher education for those they considered to be Untermenschen, Panchyshyn was allowed to teach courses at the university.

From September 1943, a series of murders of Lviv doctors were carried out, likely by Ukrainian and Polish underground organizations; among those murdered were Andriy Lastovetskyi, a physicist and close associate of Panchyshyn. This, along with anonymous threats received by Panchyshyn himself, caused him to come under severe stress. After going into hiding in St. George's Cathedral in Lviv, he died from a heart attack on 9 October.
