= Red Cossacks =

Bolshevik Cossack military unit

- Червоне Козацтво
- Active: 1918 – 1939
- Country: Ukrainian People's Republic of Soviets, Ukrainian Soviet Republic and Ukrainian SSR
- Allegiance: Before 1922: Russian SFSR (de facto); Ukrainian People's Republic of Soviets, Ukrainian Soviet Republic and Ukrainian SSR (de-jure); After 1922: Soviet Union
- Branch: Red Army (RKKA)
- Type: Cavalry
- Size: Division, Corps (originally as regiment)
- Decorations: Order of the Red Banner (1928), Order of Lenin (1934)

Commanders
- Notable commanders: Vitaly Primakov

Historical headquarters of the Red Cossacks' 8th Cavalry Division in Khmelnytskyi

The Red Cossacks (Ukrainian: Червоне козацтво, romanized: Chervone kozatstvo, Russian: Червонное казачество, romanized: Chervonnoye kazachestvo) was a military formation of Bolsheviks and the Soviet government of Ukraine. Red Cossacks was a collective name for one of the biggest cavalry formations of the Workers' and Peasants' Red Army (RKKA) and was part of the Ukrainian, Southern, and Southwestern fronts during the Russian Civil War and later was stationed in the Ukrainian SSR.

According to Vitaly Primakov, the formation was created in protection of the Soviet government in Ukraine, the liquidation of the "nationalistic and counter-revolutionary" Central Council of Ukraine and as an opposing force to the Central Council's armed forces known as the "Free Cossacks".

== History ==
The creation of Red Cossacks was first declared on 10 January [O.S. 28 December] 1918 in Kharkiv by Vitaly Primakov who previously participated in the October Revolution and was among those who stormed the Winter Palace in Petrograd (now Saint Petersburg). He also participated against the Kerensky–Krasnov uprising. The formation of the military unit continued until 9 February 1918.

In the beginning after announcing the formation, the military unit was joined by soldiers of former 3rd battalion of 2nd Ukrainian Reserve Regiment (300 individuals) who were disarmed by revolutionary detachments (1st Moscow Revolutionary Regiment headed by Pavel Yegorov) from Soviet Russia. The newly announced military unit also included local Red guards (400 individuals) of several Kharkiv factories such as Kharkiv Locomotive Factory (now the Malyshev Factory), the General Electric Company (Russian: Всеобщей компании электричества, Vseobshchaya kompaniya elektrichestva) and the Helfferich-Sade Association. With time, Red Cossack detachments were established where Soviet power was declared including Kharkiv Governorate, Poltava Governorate, and Kyiv Governorate. The formations were established voluntarily and composed out of workers and peasants predominantly Ukrainians, but also contained other ethnic representatives (Russians, Jews, others). Sister of Yuriy Kotsiubynsky, Oksana was in charge of agitation and propaganda and chief editor of Red Cossack newspaper "To arms" (Russian: К оружию). On 2 February [O.S. 20 January] 1918 the People's Secretariat of Ukraine issued its decree about organization of People's Revolutionary and Socialist Army in Ukraine, the Red Cossacks.

At first in January 1918 the regiment as part of the Soviet 4th Revolutionary Army took part in advance against the troops loyal to Central Council of Ukraine and then in fought against the advance of German and Ukrainian forces in March–April 1918 (following the Treaty of Brest-Litovsk). On 1 March 1918 soldiers of the 1st Horse Regiment of Red Cossacks attempted to rename their regiment to the 1st Workers-Peasants Socialist Regiment of the Red Army. After that the regiment was "cleansed" from non-Ukrainian element by Soviet government. During liberation of Ukraine from Bolsheviks, number of Red Cossacks sided with the Army of Ukrainian People's Republic (UNR) after the 1918 Battle of Poltava. After being withdrawn out of Ukraine, in summer of 1918 it was reformed into the 1st Dnieper Partisan detachment that operated in so called "neutral zone" that was established along the Russia–Ukraine border.

During the fall of 1918 it was reestablished as part of the 1st Ukrainian Soviet Division and then the 2nd Ukrainian Soviet Division that fought against the Army of UNR. Soon thereafter Red Cossacks were subordinated to the 1st, and later 2nd Ukrainian Soviet Division. In March-April 1919 the unit engaged in partisan raids against the rear of Ukrianian national troops. As part of the Army Group of Kyiv direction in May 1919 participated in suppression of Nykyfor Hryhoriv rebellion and in July–September 1919 fought against armies of Anton Denikin (Armed Forces of South Russia).

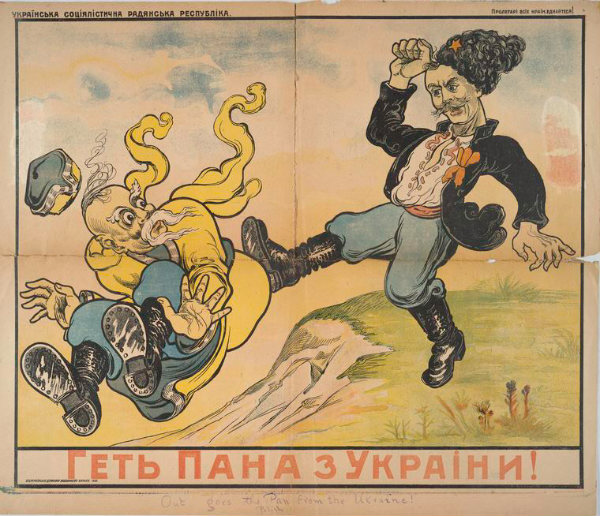
The Bolsheviks' agitation poster "Get Pan out of Ukraine" depicting one Ukrainian dressed in Red kicking other Ukrainian dressed in colors of the Ukrainian flag

In August 1919 the regiment was expanded into brigade that was part of 12th and 14th armies of the Workers and Peasants Red Army (RKKA). In October 1919 it expanded further into the 8th Cavalry Division of Red Cossacks which in November of same year conducted a raid across the Denikin's Army rears. In January 1920 the unit was subordinated to the 13th Soviet Army. In April 1920 Red Cossacks battled in the Northern Taurida Governorate against the Pyotr Wrangel's troops. In May the unit was subordinated to the 14th Army. Soon after the Polish-Ukrainian union treaty of Warsaw in 1920, the division participated in the Polish–Soviet War. In August the unit took part in battles around Proskuriv and Starokostiantyniv. During that campaign it reached the city of Stryi, but during a retreat of the Red Army, it was encircled and partially destroyed at Zbruch River by Ukrainian troops under command of Yuriy Tyutyunnyk.

Following the Polish-Soviet armistice in October 1920, the remains of Red Cossacks' 8th Cavalry Division were amalgamated with the 17th Cavalry Division, composed chiefly of Kuban Cossacks and Bashkirs, and transformed into the 1st Cavalry Corps of Red Cossacks. Throughout 1921 and 1922 the unit took part in battles against Ukrainian insurgents. During the Great Purge, almost the entire command corps of Red Cossacks was repressed and eliminated by Stalin's regime. On the eve of the Second World War, the 1st Cavalry Corps was reformed into a mechanized corps. Until the second half of 1950s, all mentions of the unit's role during the Civil War were banned.

== Notable Red Cossacks ==
- Filipp Mironov
- Syla Mishchenko
- Bublyk brothers
- Vitaly Primakov
- Rudolf Sivers

== See also ==
- Red Army
- Ukrainian–Soviet War
- 1st Cavalry Division (Soviet Union)
