= Syla Mishchenko =

Soviet military officer

Syla Musiyovych Mishchenko
- Сила Мусійович Міщенко
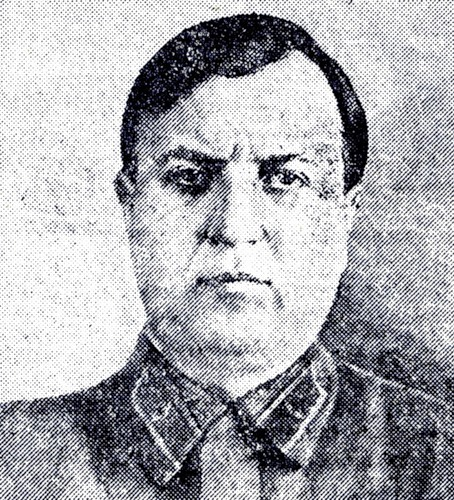
- Syla Mishchenko
- Born: 30 July 1897; Yanivka, Radomyslsky Uyezd, Kiev Governorate, Russian Empire
- Died: 16 October 1941 (aged 44); Moscow, Soviet Union
- Military career
- Allegiance: Russian Empire (1915–1917); Ukrainian People's Republic of Soviets (1918); Ukrainian Soviet Republic (1918); Ukrainian SSR (1919–1922); Soviet Union (1922–1941)
- Service years: 1915–1941
- Rank: Major general
- Commands: Sahaidachny Regiment; 4th Kurin of Red Cossacks
- Conflicts: First World War; Russian Civil War; Ukrainian–Soviet War; January Uprising; Polish-Soviet War; Battle of Warsaw
- Awards: Order of St. Stanislaus; Order of St. Anna; Order of St. Vladimir; Order of the Red Banner

Syla Musiyovych Mishchenko (Ukrainian: Сила Мусійович Міщенко, Russian: Сила Моисеевич Мищенко, romanized: Sila Moiseevich Mishchenko; 30 July 1897 — 16 October 1941) was an Imperial Russian military officer and Soviet general from Ukraine. He played a key role during the 1918 January Uprising in Kiev by supporting the Bolsheviks while being a commanding officer in the newly formed Sahaidachny Regiment.

== Biography ==
Mishchenko was born on 30 July 1897 in the village of Yanivka in Potiivka volost, Radomyslsky Uyezd (today Ivanivka, Malyn Raion) to a big family of a poor peasant. Upon graduating from a local rural school, he enrolled into the Zabolotyne Teacher Seminary. With the start of the World War I, in 1915 he finished a shortened course of the 1st Kiev Konstantinovskoye Infantry school and as a greenhorn officer was sent to frontlines.

During the First World War Mischchenko was twice wounded and received the orders of Saint Stanislaus (3rd rank), Saint Anna (3rd and 4th ranks) and Saint Vladimir (4th rank). He eventually was promoted to the rank of stabs captain. While still at the front, in June 1917 he joined the Bolshevik Party. According to his own claims, Mischchenko entered the Red Army on 15 January 1918, and for the following months served as commander of the Ukrainian Sahaidachny Regiment.

Due to his participation in the January Uprising against the Central Rada, Mishchenko was sentenced to death by a military tribunal, but managed to escape. Following the capture of Kyiv by the Bolsheviks, Mischenko headed the 4th Kurin (Battallion) of Red Cossacks. Thereafter he continued his service in the Red Army, and eventually reached the rank of major general. During the Polish-Soviet War he participated in the Battle of Warsaw. For his role in helping the 50th Rifle Brigade to escape encirclement, Mishchenko was awarded with the Order of the Red Banner.

In 1929 Mishchenko headed the Kharkiv School of Red Officers organized at the All-Ukrainian Central Executive Committee in order to provide military education in the Ukrainian language. In 1930 he was transferred to Moscow, where he worked as a lecturer at the Frunze Military Academy. On 21 April 1941 Mishchenko was arrested on accusation of "anti-Soviet agitation", which he had supposedly performed for the preceding 3 years; in particular, he was claimed to have criticized the kolkhoz system as a variety of slavery. On 16 October 1941 Mishchenko was executed by firing squad.

== Legacy ==
Following his execution, Mishchenko's name was removed from most Soviet history books, and his fate only became publicly known in 1993, when an small biographical article on him was published by the Military Historical Journal in Moscow.
