= Volodymyr Salsky =

Ukrainian general (1885–1940)

Volodymyr Salsky Володимир Сальський
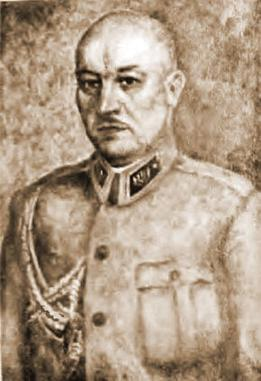
- Born: 24 July 1885; Ostroh, Volhynian Governorate Russian Empire
- Died: 5 October 1940 (aged 55); Warsaw, Poland
- Military career
- Allegiance: Ukraine
- Branch: Ukrainian People's Army
- Service years: 1912 – 1919
- Rank: Major General (1919)
- Units: 132 Infantry Bendery Regiment; 12th Army (quartermaster); MI Dept of Kiev Military District; 1st Serdyuk Division; Zaporizhia Corps; Zaporizhia Group
- Conflicts: World War I Ukrainian–Soviet War

Volodymyr Petrovych Salsky (Ukrainian: Володимир Петрович Сальський) (24 July 1885 in Ostroh, Volhynian Governorate – 5 October 1940 in Warsaw) was a Ukrainian general, minister of defense, head of the Ukrainian government in exile.

Salsky was born in the old city of Ostroh. In 1906 he finished the Vilna Infantry Cadet School and served in the 126th Infantry Rylsk Regiment. After graduating from the Nikolayev Academy of General Staff in 1912 he was commissioned as a company commander of the 132 Infantry Bendery Regiment, becoming the chief of staff of the infantry division. During World War I Salsky served at the General Staff of Military Intelligence department of the Kiev Military District and a quartermaster of the 12th Army in the Baltics.

In January 1918 Salsky moved to Kiev where he became a chief of staff of the capital city's armed forces, participating in the fight against the Bolshevik forces of Mikhail Muravyov. During the times of Ukrainian State he was appointed the chief of staff of the 1st Serdyuk Division. He also was a member of the Commission in organization of military schools and academies in Ukraine. During the Anti-Hetman Uprising in November 1918 with the rest of Division Salsky changed sides.

In the army of the UPR, he became in May 1919 Commander of the Zaporozhian Army Group, from 23 September 1919, Commander of the Army of the UPR, and in November 1919, Minister of Military Affairs of the UPR in the government of Borys Martos.

At the end of 1920 he was interned in a Polish camp in Kalisz. After his release, he settled in Warsaw. Here he was an active participant in the public-political life of the Ukrainian diaspora and he bore the title of Minister of Defense of the Government in exile.

He died on 5 October 1940 and was buried in Warsaw at the Volia cemetery.

Preceded by Vsevolod Petriv	Minister of Defense; August 1919–1920	Succeeded by Oleksiy Halkin
Preceded by ?	Minister of Defense (government in exile); August 1924–1940	Succeeded by ?
