= Bzovytsia =

Rural locality in Ternopil Oblast, Ukraine

Bzovytsia Бзовиця
- Location in Ternopil Oblast
- Coordinates: 49°43′49″N 25°17′50″E
- Country: Ukraine
- Oblast: Ternopil Oblast
- Raion: Ternopil Raion
- Hromada: Zboriv urban hromada
- Time zone: UTC+2 (EET)
  - Summer (DST): UTC+3 (EEST)
- Postal code: 47236

Bzovytsia (Ukrainian: Бзовиця) is a village in the Zboriv urban hromada of the Ternopil Raion of Ternopil Oblast in Ukraine.

== History ==
The first written mention of the village was in 1523.

After the liquidation of the Zboriv Raion on 19 July 2020, the village became part of the Ternopil Raion.

== Religion ==
- Two churches of the Assumption (1701, wooden, rebuilt in 1924; 2011, brick).

== Notable residents ==
- Volodymyr Stakhiv (1910–1971), Ukrainian nationalist politician and journalist

== Sources ==
- (in Ukrainian) Уніят В., Бзовиця // Ternopil Encyclopedic Dictionary: in 4 v. / editorial board: H. Yavorskyi and other, Ternopil: "Zbruch", 2004, V. 1: А—Й, S. 118. — ISBN 966-528-197-6.
- "Bzowica". Geographical Dictionary of the Kingdom of Poland (in Polish). 1. Warszawa: Kasa im. Józefa Mianowskiego. 1880. p. 522.
