= Secret Ukrainian University =

1921–1925 underground university in Lwów, Poland

Coordinates: 49°50′33″N 24°01′56″E

- Таємний український університет
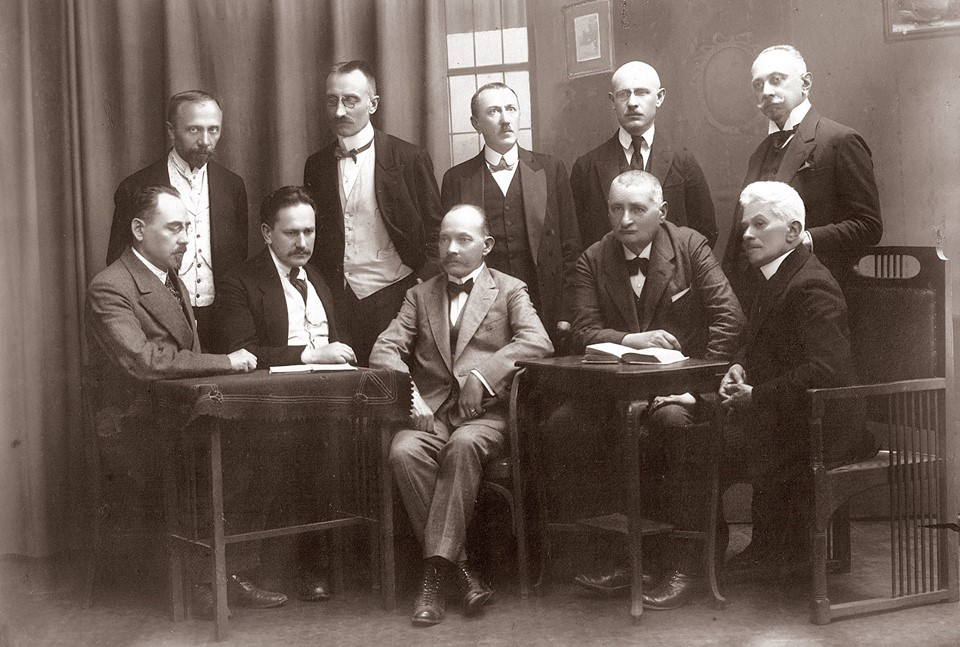
- Senate of the Secret Ukrainian University in 1921. Sitting, from left: Myron Korduba, Marian Panchyshyn, Vasyl Shchurat, Ivan Kurovets, Maksym Levytskyi. Standing: Ivan Rakovskyi, Volodymyr Verhanovskyi, Roman Kovshevych, Maksym Muzyka, Myron Vakhnianin
- Type: Non-profit
- Active: July 1921–1925
- Rector: Vasyl Shchurat; Marian Panchyshyn; Yevhen Davydiak
- Location: Lwów (now Lviv), Second Polish Republic (now Ukraine)

The Secret or Underground Ukrainian University (Ukrainian: Таємний український університет, romanized: Taiemnyi ukrainskyi universytet), formally known as the Ukrainian University of Lviv (Ukrainian: Львівський український університет, romanized: Lvivskyi ukrainskyi universytet), was an underground Ukrainian university which existed in the city of Lwów in the Second Polish Republic (now Lviv, Ukraine) between 1921 and 1925.

== History ==
The Secret Ukrainian University was founded in July 1921 on a joint initiative of the Shevchenko Scientific Society, the Petro Mohyla Scientific Lecture Society, and the Stauropegion Institute. The basis of the university's organisation was the Ukrainian People's University, which had been disestablished in 1919 or 1920.

The university was established during a time of degrading of Ukrainians' rights within the Second Polish Republic. Polish authorities had removed all Ukrainian teachers and chairs from the University of Lviv and excluded higher education to citizens of Poland or the Allies in 1919, additionally banning Ukrainian-language courses the next year. The latter measure prompted a group of Ukrainian intellectuals in Lviv (then Lwów) to begin teaching clandestine courses in the humanities, law, and medicine. These courses later formed the basis of the Secret Ukrainian University. The first rector of the university was writer Vasyl Shchurat.

The Secret Ukrainian University was a non-profit, funded by donations from supporters. It received support from the Shevchenko Society, the Lviv chapter of Prosvita, the Lwów Ecclesiastical Museum, St. George's Cathedral, and Ridna Shkola, as well as members of the Ukrainian diaspora. By the end of 1921, there were 1,260 students studying in 54 different departments. This increased to 1,600 students across 65 departments the next year.

Contrary to its name, the Secret Ukrainian University operated openly and in defiance of Polish authorities. After Shchurat's 1921 arrest, he was replaced by Marian Panchyshyn, who was later replaced by Yevhen Davydiak. The vast majority of Ukrainian intellectuals active in Lviv at the time supported the university, as part of the Ukrainian community's boycott of Polish educational institutions. The Polish government responded to the university's growth by launching a wide-reaching crackdown, prompting the university staff to issue a request to the League of Nations for protection.

The university began negotiations with Polish authorities for a resolution to the conflict in 1924. The university was represented by Kyrylo Studynsky and Roman Smal-Stocki, while the Polish government was represented by Stanisław Grabski, Stanisław Łoś, and Tadeusz Waryński. Ultimately, the proposals to reestablish Ukrainian-language education in Poland were rejected, owing to the Polish government's desire to strengthen the Polish character of Lviv, and the Secret Ukrainian University was forced to close at the end of 1925. Much of its activities were dispersed among other Ukrainian organisations, including Lviv Polytechnic.
