= Intergal-Bud =

- Native name: Інтергал-буд
- Industry: Real estate
- Founded: 2003
- Headquarters: Lviv, Ukraine
- Website: intergal-bud.com.ua

Intergal-Bud is a Ukrainian development company. It is the largest developer and one of the leaders in the Ukrainian residential real estate market in terms of housing commissioned in 2022–2024.

The company specializes in the construction of residential complexes, commercial properties, and mixed-use projects in many cities across Ukraine.

Its portfolio includes 107 successfully completed residential projects (the company has finished and commissioned them).

Over 22 years, the company has built 182 buildings. The total area of constructed properties is approximately 4.6–4.8 million m² of residential and commercial real estate,

In Kyiv, the company’s portfolio includes 21 properties, among which 12 residential complexes of comfort+, business, and premium class are currently under active construction.[6]Intergal-Bud is a Ukrainian real estate development company. It has built residential and commercial real estate in Kyiv, Lviv, Chernivtsi, Zhytomyr, Uzhhorod, Rivne, and Odesa.

== History ==
Intergal-Bud was founded in 2003 in Lviv. In 2009, the company began developing projects in Kyiv. Its first residential complexes were Parkovi Ozera and Yaskravyi.

Since 2012, Intergal-Bud has been a member of the Confederation of Builders of Ukraine. Since 2014, the company has been part of the Confederation’s Board of Directors.

In 2018, together with the Expocenter of Ukraine, Intergal-Bud launched a project to improve a recreational area on the territory of VDNH.

In 2019, Intergal-Bud began construction projects in Odesa.

In 2020, the company started cooperating with Zero Waste, supporting initiatives for waste sorting and the renovation of green spaces in Kyiv.

From 2019 to 2021, the company restored the historic St. Petersburg hotel building on Taras Shevchenko Boulevard.

In 2021, Intergal-Bud initiated the INTERGAL-BUD CUP football tournament among residents’ teams of its residential complexes to promote good neighborly relations and an active lifestyle.

In 2021, in cooperation with Ukrgasbank, Globus Bank, and Kredobank, Intergal-Bud launched a mortgage project under the government program “Affordable Mortgage 7%” for the primary real estate market. The project applies to several of the company’s residential complexes in Kyiv, Lviv, Zhytomyr, and Chernivtsi.

Intergal-Bud develops residential complexes, business centers, and commercial properties in Kyiv, Lviv, Chernivtsi, Zhytomyr, Uzhhorod, Rivne, and Odesa.

In 2021, Dmytro Spitkovskyi, CEO of the Intergal-Bud group of companies, was recognized as one of the top three managers in Ukraine in the Focus magazine ranking in the category Real Estate.

In March 2022, the company presented its investment projects in Ukraine at the international real estate event MIPIM-2022 in Cannes, which was held to support Ukraine in its defense against Russian aggression.

In 2025, the company commissioned over 194,617 m² and launched new projects totaling 163,000 m².
