= Volodymyr Horbovy =

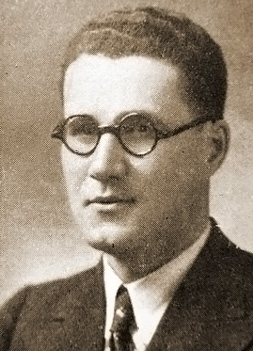
Volodymyr Horbovy

Volodymyr Horbovy (January 30, 1899 – May 21, 1984) was a Ukrainian politician during World War II. As a member of the Organization of Ukrainian Nationalists (OUN) and later the Bandera faction (OUN-B), he was one of the main drivers of the Declaration of Ukrainian Independence in 1941.

== Early life ==
Volodymyr Horbovy was born on January 30, 1899, in the city of Dolyna (then Austria-Hungary, currently the Ivano-Frankivsk Oblast).

During World War I, he served in the Austro-Hungarian army on the Italian front, where he lost an eye.

In 1918, he joined the Ukrainian Galician Army, and participated in the Winter Campaigns.

During the inter-war period, he studied law in Prague.

== Political career ==
In 1920, Horbovy joined the Ukrainian Military Organization (UVO). He became the liaison between the regional and national commands in 1922. In 1929, he joined OUN.

In 1934, he was imprisoned by Polish authorities for activities against the Polish state.

On June 22, 1941, the Ukrainian National Committee (Ukrayinsky Natsionalny' Komitet; UNK) was created in Kraków, with Volodymyr Horbovy as a president. The UNK published an essay, "Memorial", which outlined the plans of the OUN-B to declare independence. In 1947, he was arrested by the Czech police in Prague and handed over to the Poles, who in turn handed him over to the USSR authorities in 1948. Horbovy was sentenced to 25 years in a labor camp, and served his entire sentence. He was released on August 1, 1972, and remained under police supervision until the end of his life.
