= Volodymyr Stakhiv =

Ukrainian nationalist politician and journalist

- Володимир Стахів

Minister of Foreign Affairs of Ukraine
- In office 30 June 1941 – 12 July 1941
- Preceded by: Position established
- Succeeded by: Position abolished

Personal details
- Born: 1910 Bzovytsia, Austria-Hungary (now Ukraine)
- Died: 1971 (aged 60–61) Munich, West Germany (now Germany)
- Party: Organization of Ukrainian Nationalists

Volodymyr Pavlovych Stakhiv (Ukrainian: Володимир Павлович Стахів; 1910 – 1971) was a Ukrainian nationalist politician and journalist who was a member of the Organization of Ukrainian Nationalists, serving as Minister of Foreign Affairs in the Ukrainian national government. He was the brother of Yevhen Stakhiv.

== Biography ==
Volodymyr Pavlovych Stakhiv was born in the village of Bzovytsia, in what was then the Kingdom of Galicia and Lodomeria in Austria-Hungary in 1910. His father was Pavlo Stakhiv, a member of the Ukrainian Galician Army from Kyiv.

Stakhiv graduated from gymnasium in Przemyśl in 1930, and afterwards became a member of Plast and the Organization of Ukrainian Nationalists (OUN). He later became head of the OUN in Przemyśl, but left to study in Berlin. There, he participated in the Ukrainian student movement, joining an international forum. He edited the Ukrainian Press Service German-language bulletin until 1941, additionally providing information to international news correspondents about Ukrainian affairs.

Stakhiv was a member of the Ukrainian national government, in charge of foreign affairs. In June 1941, he sent Adolf Hitler an official letter stating that the OUN believed the "Jewish-Bolshevik impact" on Europe would soon be checked and that the establishment of an independent Ukrainian state was near at hand following Operation Barbarossa. On 15 September 1941, however, he and other OUN members were arrested by the Gestapo and was interned at Sachsenhausen concentration camp until 1944. He and other OUN leaders were interned at Zellenbau, the area of the camp for political prisoners, who received improved treatment, including access to newspapers, mail packages, exemptions from the daily roll calls, and better food.

Following his release, Stakhiv emigrated to Munich, where he worked with the Ukrainian Supreme Liberation Council and OUN as a diplomat. He also became head of the German branch of the Organisation of Ukrainian Nationalists and League of Political Prisoners. In exile, Stakhiv was also chief editor of Ukrainian newspapers Ukrainian Tribune and Modern Ukraine, and co-editor of the newspapers To Arms and Modernity. He eventually died in Munich in 1971.
