= Vsevolod Petriv =

Ukrainian historian and general (1883–1948)

- Всеволод Миколайович Петрів
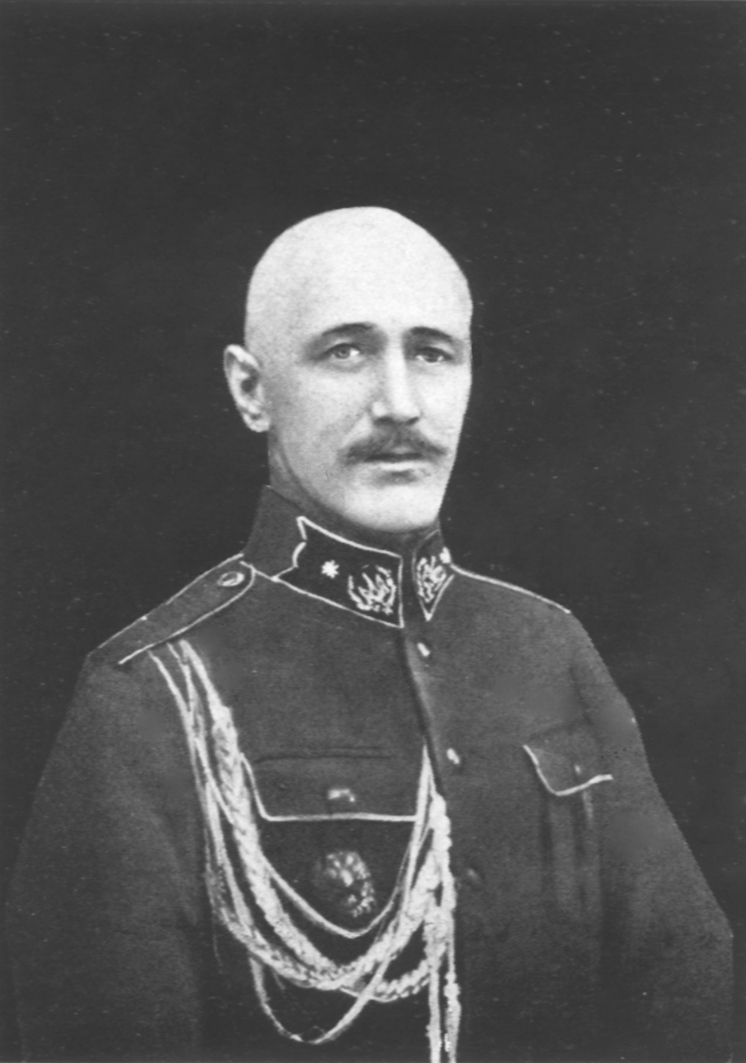
- Petriv in 1920
- Born: 12 January 1883; Kiev, Kiev Governorate, Russian Empire
- Died: 10 July 1948 (aged 65); Augsburg, American Occupation Zone, Allied-occupied Germany
- Military career
- Allegiance: Russian Empire; Ukrainian People's Republic; Ukrainian State
- Branch: Army
- Service years: 1914–1922
- Rank: General
- Units: 42 Rifle Division; 7th Turkestan Division (head of staff); Hordienko Regiment; UNR Army
- Commands: UNR Head of Staff
- Conflicts: World War I; Battle of Galicia; Kerensky Offensive; Ukrainian–Soviet War
- Awards: Order of St. George
- Other work: Historian; publicist; pedagogue

Vsevolod Mykolaiovych Petriv (Ukrainian: Всеволод Миколайович Петрів; 12 January 1883 – 10 July 1948) was a colonel of the Imperial Russian Army, General and Chief of the General Staff of the Ukrainian People's Army (or Ukrainian National Army), publicist, historian, and teacher. He is known as a military leader during the Ukrainian–Soviet War.

He is also known for recording the military history of the Ukrainian armed forces.

== Biography ==
=== Early years ===
Vsevolod Petriv was born in Kyiv on 12 January 1883 into a military family. His father Mykola Verner-Petriv, was a Swede and a high-ranking officer in the Imperial Russian Army. He was of Scandinavian heritage, whose family had participated in the Great Northern War and had fallen prisoner to Peter the Great. Because of his military acumen, he was granted the surname Petriv, as well as a military position by Peter the Great.

His mother was Norwegian - Alexandra Strollman. She was born in the village of Burty, Chernigov Governorate.

=== Education ===
As a son of a high-ranking military officer, Vsevolod attended only the best schools. He attended the military academy in Kyiv, graduating in 1900. He attended officer training in Saint Petersburg, graduating in 1902, and the Nikolayev Officer School, graduating in 1910.

== Military service in World War I ==
Petriv entered the war as a member of the Russian Imperial Army at the 42nd Infantry Division, later joined the 7th Turkestani Rifle Division and rose in the ranks to colonel and head of staff. Was wounded during Siege of Przemyśl. Awarded by Order of St. George. In late 1917 he pledged allegiance to the Ukrainian People's Republic.

== Ukrainian–Soviet War ==
In 1917 headed Kost Hordiyenko Regiment. At the times of the Hetmanate he was arrested but soon released. With the fall of the Directorate in November 1920 he went abroad to Poland were in 1921 he was assigned to the post of the Head of the Staff of the Ukrainian National Republic Army.

== The Inter-war Years ==
In 1923 he moved to Czechoslovakia. From 1923 to 1938, Petriv was giving lectures at the Drahomanov Institute in Prague. He was a very prolific writer, authoring no less than nine in-depth books about Ukrainian military history. later to Czechoslovakia.

== World War II ==
In April 1939 he was arrested and transferred to Brno where he worked at the local factory. In April 1945 he was transferred by the Germans to Bavaria.

== Death and legacy ==
He was placed at the DP camp by the U.S. military administration where he died on 10 July 1948.

In December 2022 the (Mikhail) Kirponos street in Kyiv, Ukraine was renamed to Vsevolod Petriv street.

== Bibliography ==
- Society and Army: Social-historical description. Prague, Berlin 1924;
- Adapting military knowledge (Усуспільнення військових знань) // Student Digest. Prague 1926. #6. pp. 6–11;
- Fragment to the history of Ukrainian-Polish compromise (Фрагмент до історії українсько-польського зближення) // New Ukraine, Prague 1927. ##1-2. pp. 75–80;
- Memories of the Ukrainian revolution times, 1917-1921 (Спомини з часів української революції, 1917–1921). Lviv 1927–1931;
- Fragments of memories (Уривки зі споминів) // Calendar of the Guelder-Rose for 1929. Lviv 1928. pp. 29–39;
- Army of the Ukrainian People's Republic 1917-21 // Ukrainian General Encyclopedia. Lviv, Stanyslaviv, Kolomyia 1934. vol.3. pp. 762–767;
- Zhytomyr junior school: formation, science, fights, first alumni of Ukrainian officers. Pages of unpublished diary. (Житомирська юнацька школа: формування, наука, бої, перший випуск української старшини. Сторінки з ненадрукованого щоденника) // Chronicles of the Guelder-Rose. Lviv 1936. #5. pp. 18–19; #6. p. 7; #7/8. p. 15; #10. pp. 11–15; #11. pp. 14–17; 1937. #1. p. 19; #3. pp. 14–17; #6. p. 17;
- Strategic operations of Bohdan Khmelnytsky during the 1648-1649 war (Стратегічні операції Богдана Хмельницького під час війни 1648-1649 років) // Army of Ukraine. Kyiv 1993. #6. p. 43; #7. p. 74; #8. p. 93;
- By unbeaten road: Memories of history of the Ukrainian revolution 1917-1921 (Неторованим шляхом: Спомини з історії української революції 1917-1921 рр). // Fatherland. 1993. ##5-6. pp. 123–135; ##7-8. pp. 137–154; 1994. ##1-2. pp. 137–149; ##5-6. pp. 143–156. Literature: Havrylyuk І. Out of great past (З величного минулого) // For Statehood. Warsaw 1929.#1. p. 130;

Preceded by H.Syrotenko	Minister of Defense; July 1919–August 1919	Succeeded by Volodymyr Salsky
