= Yaroslav Stetsko =

Ukrainian politician and leader of the OUN-B (1912–1986)

- Ярослав Стецько
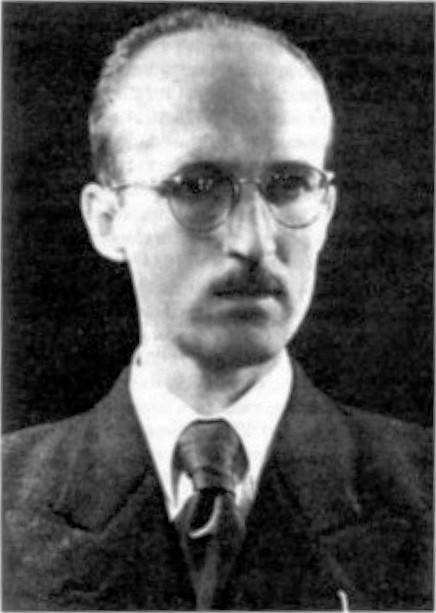
- Stetsko before 1936

Leader of the OUN-B
- In office 1968–1986
- Preceded by: Stepan Lenkavskyi
- Succeeded by: Vasyl Oleskiv

Prime Minister of the Ukrainian National Government
- In office 30 June 1941 – 12 July 1941
- Preceded by: Government established
- Succeeded by: Government disestablished

Chairman of the Anti-Bolshevik Bloc of Nations
- In office 1945/1946–July 5, 1986
- Preceded by: Alfred Rosenberg (unofficial, until 1944)
- Succeeded by: Slava Stetsko

Personal details
- Born: 19 January 1912 Tarnopol, Austria-Hungary (now Ternopil, Ukraine)
- Died: 5 July 1986 (aged 74) Munich, West Germany
- Party: OUN-B
- Spouse: Slava Stetsko
- Occupation: Politician

Yaroslav Semenovych Stetsko (Ukrainian: Ярослав Семенович Стецько; 19 January 1912 – 5 July 1986) was a Ukrainian politician, writer and ideologist who served as the leader of Stepan Bandera's faction of the Organization of Ukrainian Nationalists, the OUN-B, from 1941 until his death. During the German invasion of the Soviet Union in 1941, he was named the temporary head of an independent Ukrainian government which was declared in the act of restoration of the Ukrainian state. From 1942 to 1944, he was imprisoned in Sachsenhausen concentration camp. After World War II, Stetsko was the head of the Anti-Bolshevik Bloc of Nations until his death in 1986.

== Early life ==
Stetsko was born on 19 January 1912 in Tarnopol, Austria-Hungary (now Ternopil, Ukraine) into a Ukrainian Catholic priest's family. His father, Semen, and his mother, Teodoziya, née Chubaty, encouraged him to pursue a higher education. Yaroslav not only graduated from high school in Ternopil, but later studied law and philosophy at the Kraków and Lwów Universities, graduating in 1934.

Yaroslav Stetsko was active in Ukrainian nationalist organizations from an early age. He was a member of three separate organizations: "Ukrayinska Natsionalistychna Molod'" (Ukrainian Nationalist Youth; Ukrainian: Українська Націоналістична Молодь) where he became a member of the National Executive in 1932, Ukrainian Military Organization (UVO) (Ukrainian: Українська Військова Організація) and eventually the Organization of Ukrainian Nationalists (OUN) (Ukrainian: Організація Українських Націоналістів).

Because of his anti-Polish activities and the recent assassination of Bronisław Pieracki by Ukrainian nationalists, Stetsko was arrested by Polish authorities in 1934 and sentenced to a 5-year term. This sentence was reduced, and Stetsko was released in 1937 in a general amnesty.

== World War II ==
=== Nazis and the OUN ===
According to the National Academy of Sciences of Ukraine and other sources, OUN leaders had meetings with the heads of Nazi Germany's intelligence, regarding the formation of "Nachtigall" and "Roland" Battalions. In spring the OUN received 2.5 million marks for subversive activities inside the USSR.

=== Operation Barbarossa ===
On 30 June 1941, Stetsko declared in Lviv the formation of a Ukrainian National Government which "will closely cooperate with the National-Socialist Greater Germany, under the leadership of its leader Adolf Hitler which is forming a new order in Europe and the world" – as stated in the text of the "Act of Proclamation of Ukrainian Statehood" Gestapo and Abwehr officials protected Bandera followers, as both organizations intended to use them for their own purposes.

On 3 July 1941 Stetsko wrote a letter to Adolf Hitler in which he expressed his gratitude and admiration for the German army, and wished the war with the USSR to end with a quick victory. This letter was not included in the list of documents of the National Academy of Sciences of Ukraine "OUN in 1941".

The fait accompli presented by the Restoration was received negatively by the Germans, a report of the Chief of the SD in Berlin, dated July 2, 1941 reads: "Additional measures against the Bandera group, in particular against Bandera himself, are being planned. They will be implemented as soon as possible. EK 4a and EK 4b have also arrived in Lviv with their staff".

In Cracow, a special commission headed by Under Secretary of the Third Reich, Kundt, questioned those involved in the Restoration. In "Discussion with members of the Ukrainian National Committee and Stepan Bandera" dated July 3, 1941, Kundt stresses to those questioned "Only Adolf Hitler can determine what will happen there", referring to Ukraine.

After being placed under house arrest on 2 July, Bandera was arrested on July 5 and deported to Berlin. In the meantime Stetsko continued to form his government. The composition of Stetsko's cabinet draw the ire of the SD in Berlin, who in a reported dated July 4, 1941 lists "The present composition: Head of the Government - Stetsko; Minister of Health -Dr. Panchyshyn" and "Ministry of War - Riko Yaryi married to a Jew". Stetsko was arrested with Roman Ilnytskyi on July 9 and deported to Berlin.

In Berlin, Stetsko was pressed to explain the circumstances of the proclamation, and that he acted without German approval, in "A Statement by the Head of the Ukrainian Government" dated 15 July 1941, Stetsko reaffirms "I did not arrange the Proclamation of the Ukrainian Government with any of the German administrative authorities".

Professor Hans Koch, a captain in the Abwehr who had been present at the "National Assembly in Lviv" was questioned numerous times about his prior knowledge of the proclamation. He clarified he warned against this "irrational step" and refused to shake hands with Stetsko. In a "Report by Gr. Baum to Grosskopf" dated 21 July 1941, it is clarified that Koch "strongly reproached Mr. Stetsko for his disloyalty and left the assembly room with the other representatives of the Wehrmacht".

Prior to the Restoration of the Ukrainian State on 30 June 1941, OUN-B leadership issued the 'Memorandum of the OUN on the Resolution of the Ukrainian Question' dated 15 June and delivered to the Reich Chancellery on 23 June. The memorandum was received negatively in Berlin, in a Report to the Reichsminister for Foreign Affairs, dated July 1, 1941, the Grosskopf writes: "With regard to the future, it warns Germany, sometimes with a threatening tone, that the reorganisation of Eastern Europe can only be maintained by the creation of an independent Ukrainian state and not by a lasting, determined military occupation. This Ukrainian state must also be economically independent and must not have its economic centre in Berlin".

Bandera and Stetsko were held in the central Berlin prison at Spandau from 15 September 1941 until January 1942, when they were transferred to Sachsenhausen concentration camp's special barrack for high-profile political prisoners, Zellenbau.

In April 1944 Stepan Bandera and his deputy Yaroslav Stetsko were approached by Otto Skorzeny to discuss plans for diversions and sabotage against the Soviet Army.

In September 1944 Stetsko and Stepan Bandera were released by the German authorities in the hope that he would rouse the native populace to fight the advancing Soviet Army. With German consent, Bandera set up headquarters in Berlin. The Germans supplied the OUN-B and the UIA by air with arms and equipment. Assigned German personnel and agents trained to conduct terrorist and intelligence activities behind Soviet lines, as well as some OUN-B leaders, were also transported by air until early 1945.

In April 1945 Stetsko was seriously injured during an American air raid on a Nazi military convoy in Bohemia.

=== Antisemitism ===
In August 1941 Stetsko allegedly wrote his autobiography. It was addressed to the German authorities, and contained several notable antisemitic passages; in particular he stated that he considered Marxism a product of Jewish thought, that was put into practice by the Muscovite-Asiatic people with Jewish assistance, and that Moscow and the Jews are the carriers of the international ideas of the Bolsheviks. He stated that although he considered Moscow rather than the Jews to be the main enemy of imprisoned Ukraine, he absolutely endorsed the idea of the indubitably harmful role of Jews in the enslavement of Ukraine by Moscow. He finally stated that he absolutely endorsed the extermination of the Jews, and the rationality of the German methods of extermination of Jews, instead of assimilating them.

In the second half of the 1950s, Yaroslav Stetsko collaborated with Haviv Shyber, who represented the Israeli organization Anti-Communist Voice of Jerusalem, to form a world anti-communist organization.

== After the war ==
Stetsko continued to be very active politically after World War II. In 1968 he became the head of the OUN-B. He also became a board member of the World Anti-Communist League.

=== Anti-Bolshevik Bloc of Nations ===
In 1946, Stetsko spearheaded the creation of a new anti-Soviet organization, the Anti-Bolshevik Bloc of Nations (ABN). He was president of this organization until his death.

In 1983 he was received at the United States Capitol and, later, at the White House, where President Ronald Reagan and Vice President George H. W. Bush received him as the "last premier of a free Ukrainian State".

== Death ==
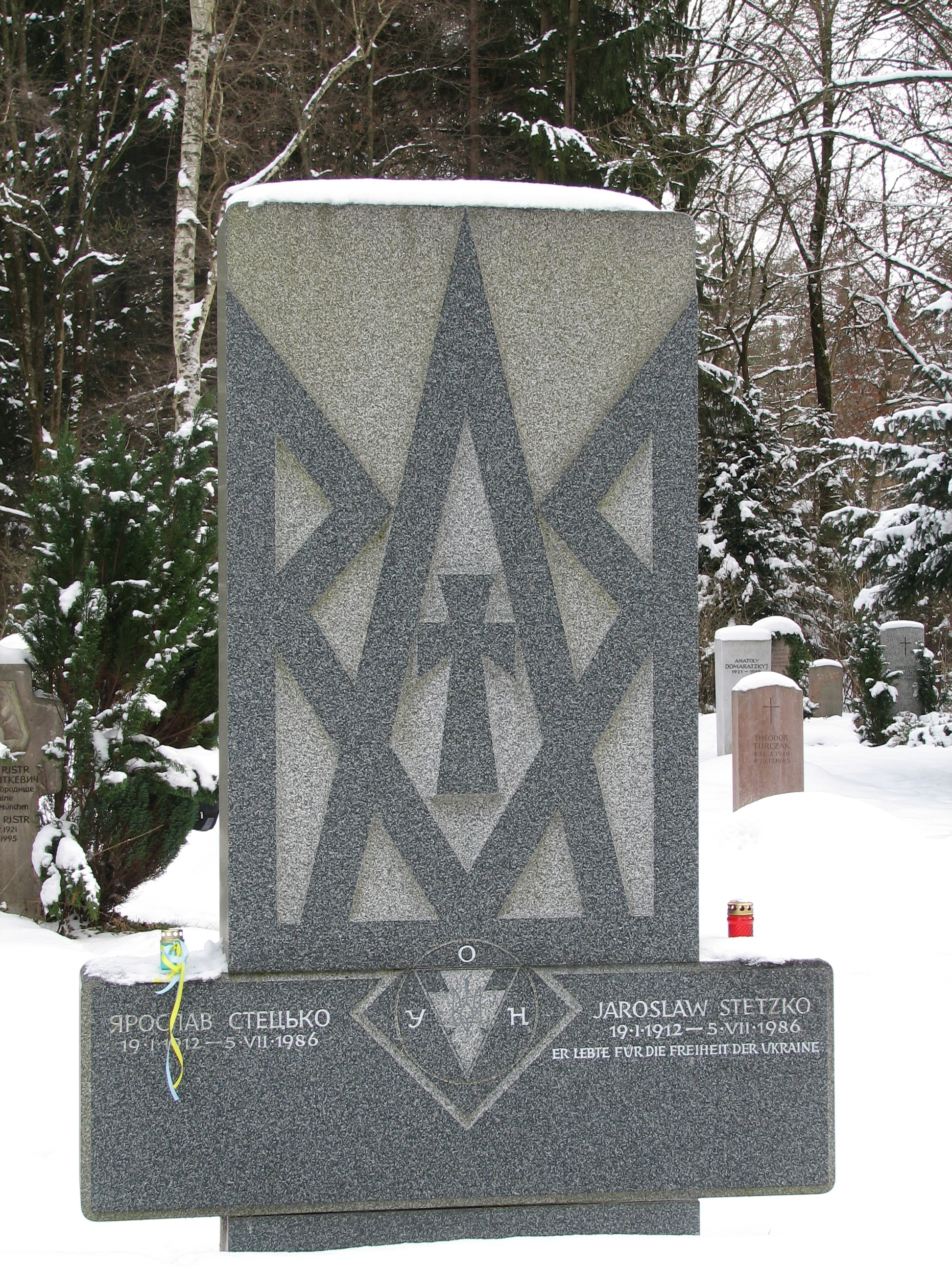
Grave of Yaroslav Stetsko

On 5 July 1986, Yaroslav Stetsko died in Munich, West Germany. He was 74 years old. Stetsko was buried in the Munich Waldfriedhof.

== Legacy ==
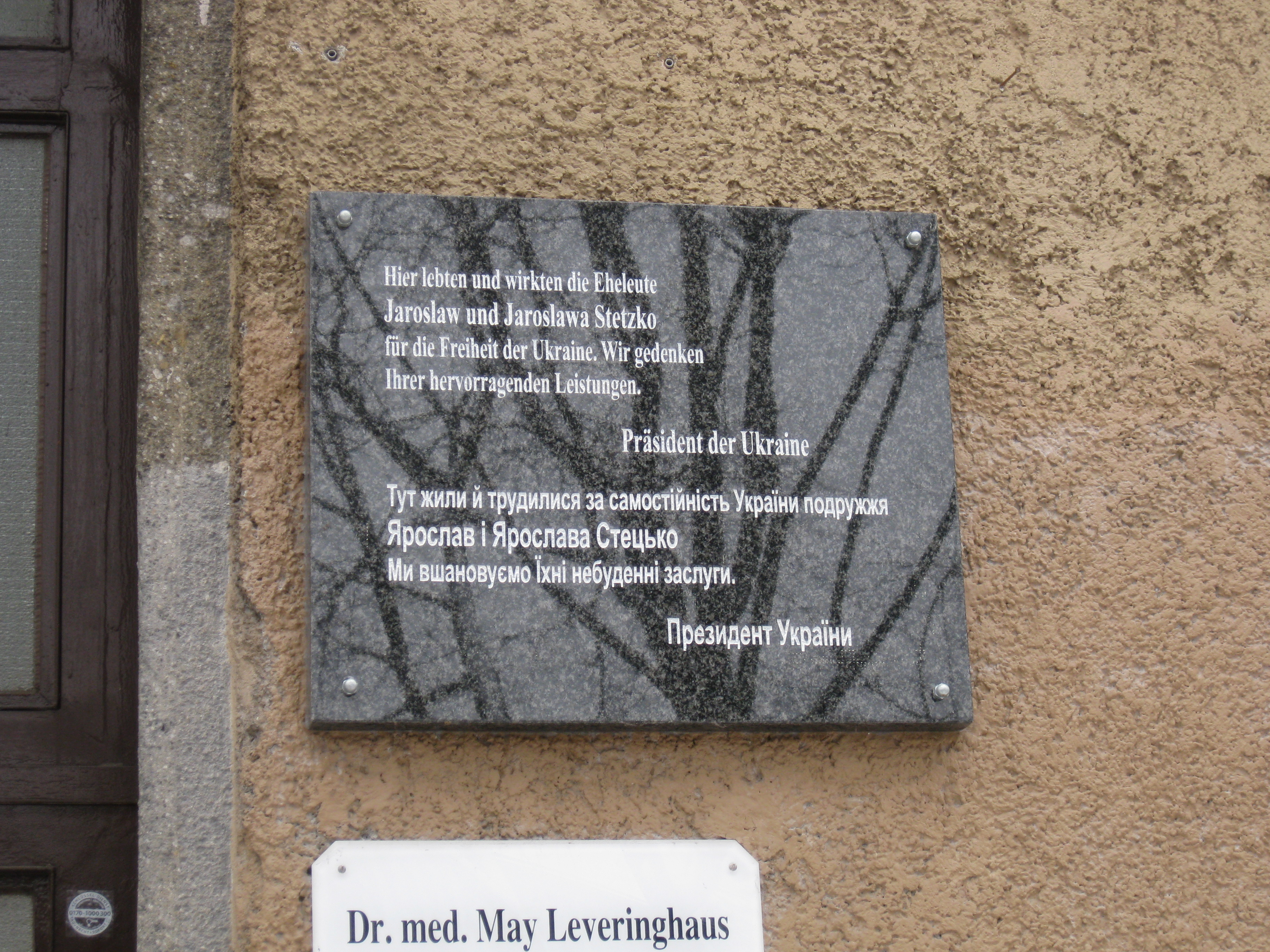
Memorial plaque for Yaroslav Stetsko and his wife in Munich, Zeppelinstrasse

Stetsko's book "Two Revolutions" (1951) is the ideological cornerstone of the ultranationalist party All-Ukrainian Union "Svoboda". The essence of his doctrine is contained in a 1938 work by Stetsko entitled "Without National Revolution There Is No Social One",

"the revolution will not end with the establishment of the Ukrainian state, but will go on to establish equal opportunities for all people to create and share material and spiritual values and in this respect the national revolution is also a social one".

In 2010, at the initiative of Viktor Yushchenko, a plaque for Stetsko was mounted at his home in Zeppelinstraße 67 in Munich.

A decoration of Ukraine's Ternopil province, the Badge "for Merits to Ternopil Oblast" is named after Stetsko.
