= List of Holocaust memorials and museums in the United States =

This is a list of Holocaust memorials and museums situated in the United States, organized by state.

== Online only ==
- The Cybrary of the Holocaust
- The Nizkor Project
- Fortnite Holocaust Museum

== Arizona ==
- The Center for Hope, Humanity, and Holocaust Education (Phoenix)
- Jewish Museum and Holocaust Center (Tucson)

== California ==
- California Holocaust Awareness and Action Interactive Museum (CHAIM; mobile exhibit in the Bay Area)
- The Desert Holocaust Memorial (Palm Desert)
- Holocaust Center of Northern California (San Francisco)
- The Holocaust Memorial at California Palace of the Legion of Honor, Lincoln Park (San Francisco)
- Los Angeles Museum of the Holocaust
- The Museum of Tolerance (Los Angeles)
- The Pink Triangle Park (San Francisco)
- The Simon Wiesenthal Center (Los Angeles)
- The Survivors of the Shoah Visual History Foundation at University of Southern California (Los Angeles)
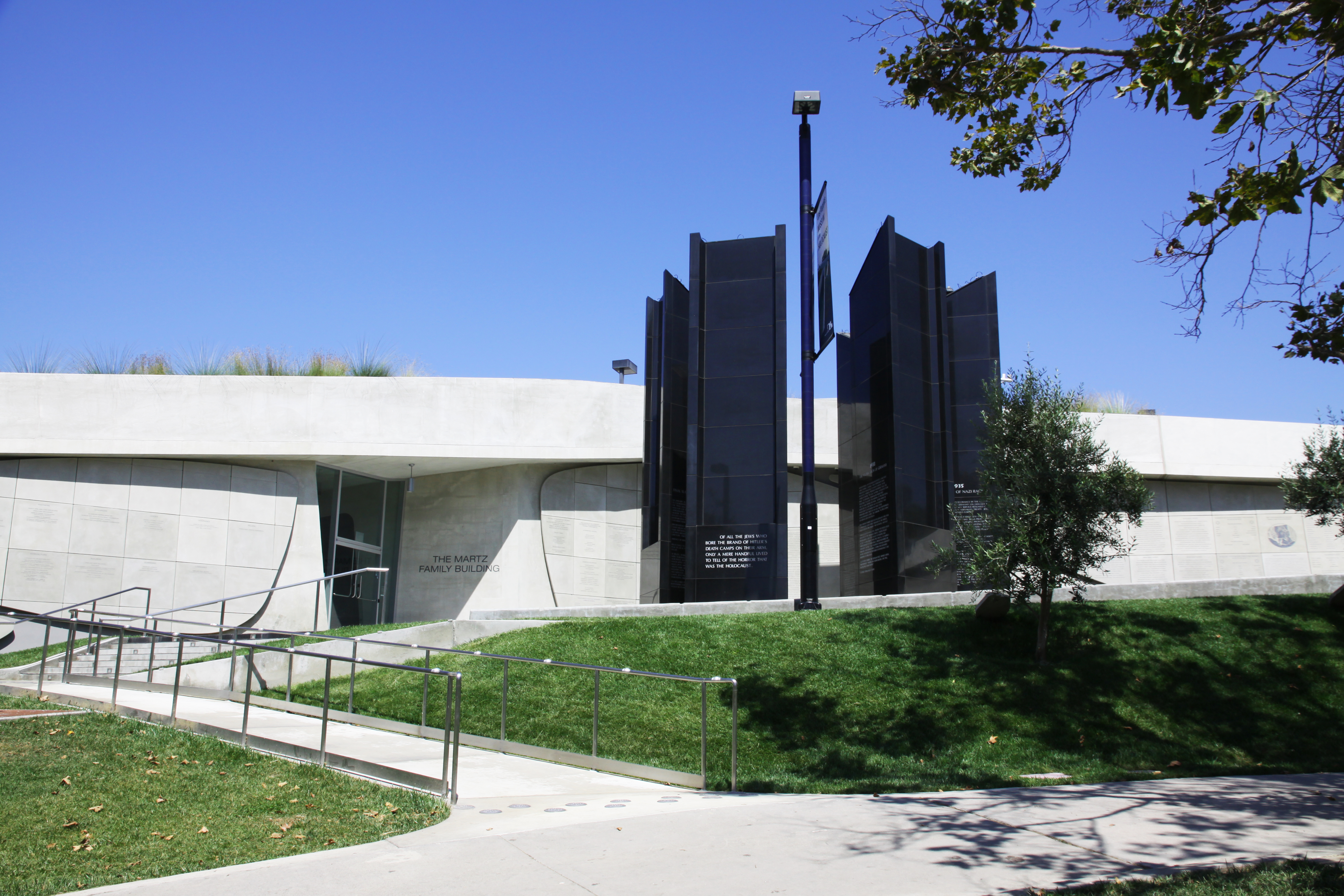
L.A. Museum of the Holocaust

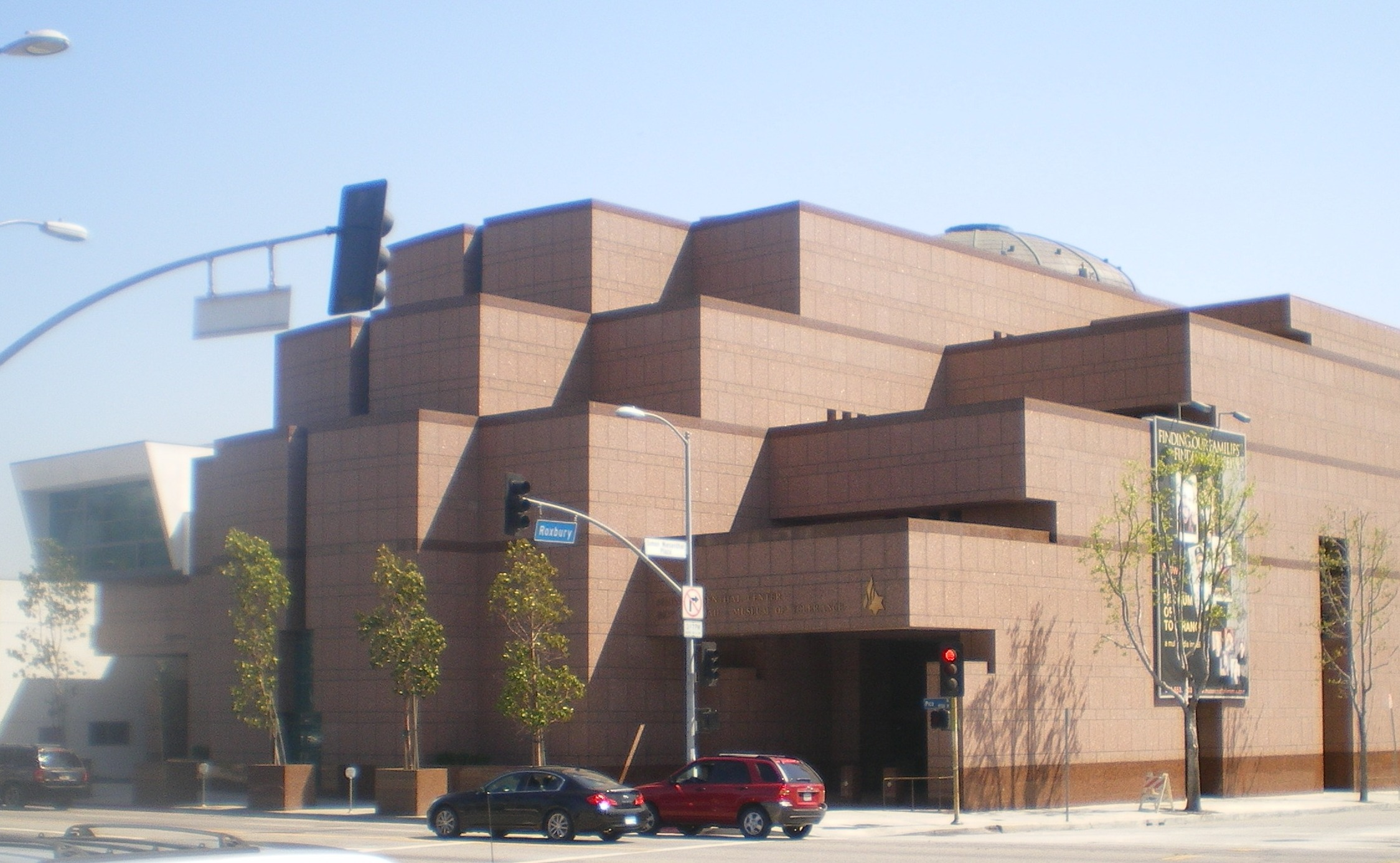
Museum of Tolerance

== Colorado ==
- The Babi Yar Park (Denver)
- Holocaust Memorial Social Action Site (University of Denver campus)

== Connecticut ==
- The New Haven Holocaust Memorial (New Haven)

== Florida ==
- The Florida Holocaust Museum (St. Petersburg)
- The Frisch Family Holocaust Memorial Gallery (Jacksonville)
- The Holocaust Memorial of the Greater Miami Jewish Federation (Miami Beach)
- The Holocaust Documentation & Education Center (Dania Beach)
- The Holocaust Museum & Education Center of SWFL (Naples)
- The Holocaust Memorial Resource and Education Center (Maitland)
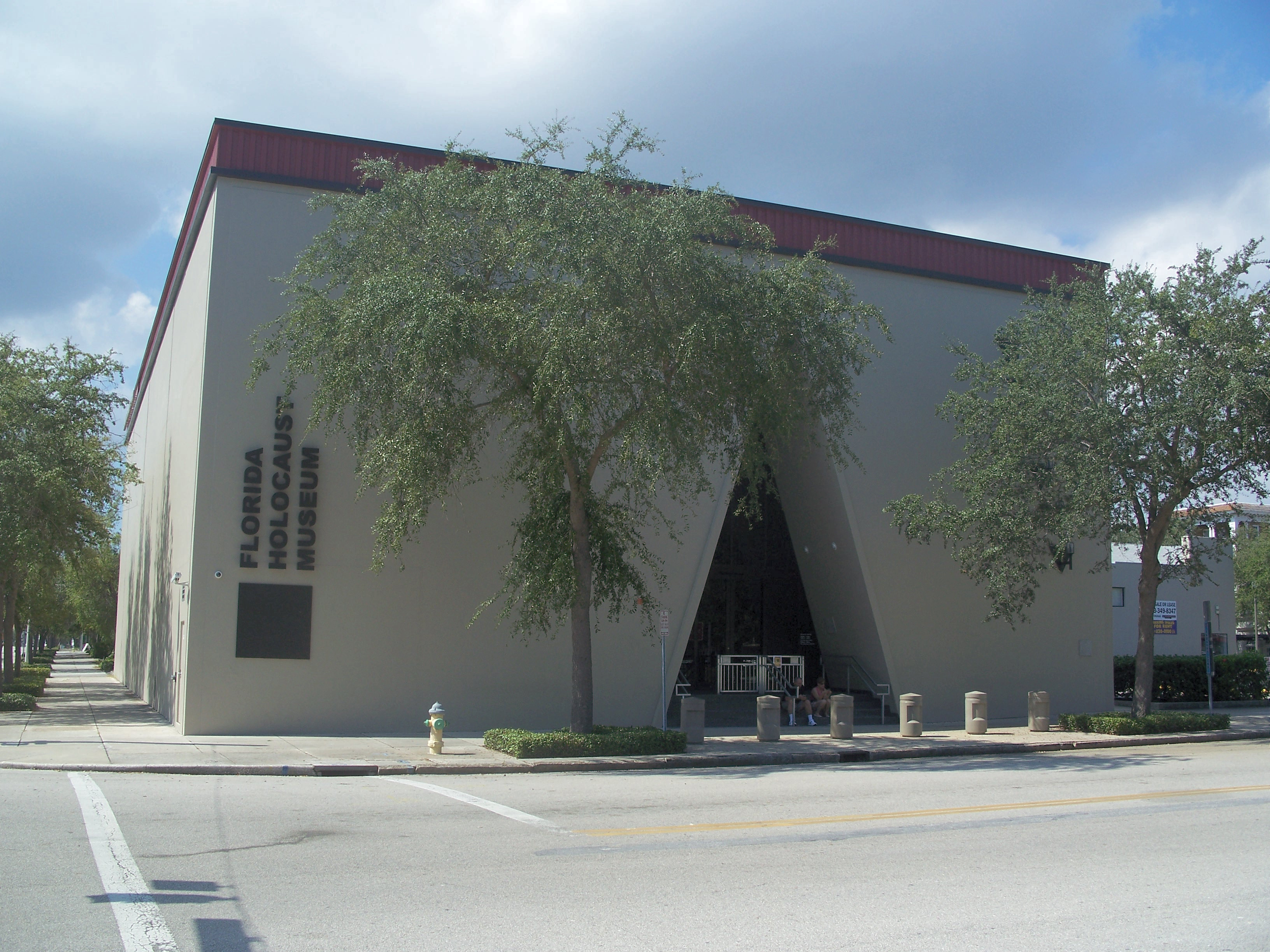
Florida Holocaust Museum

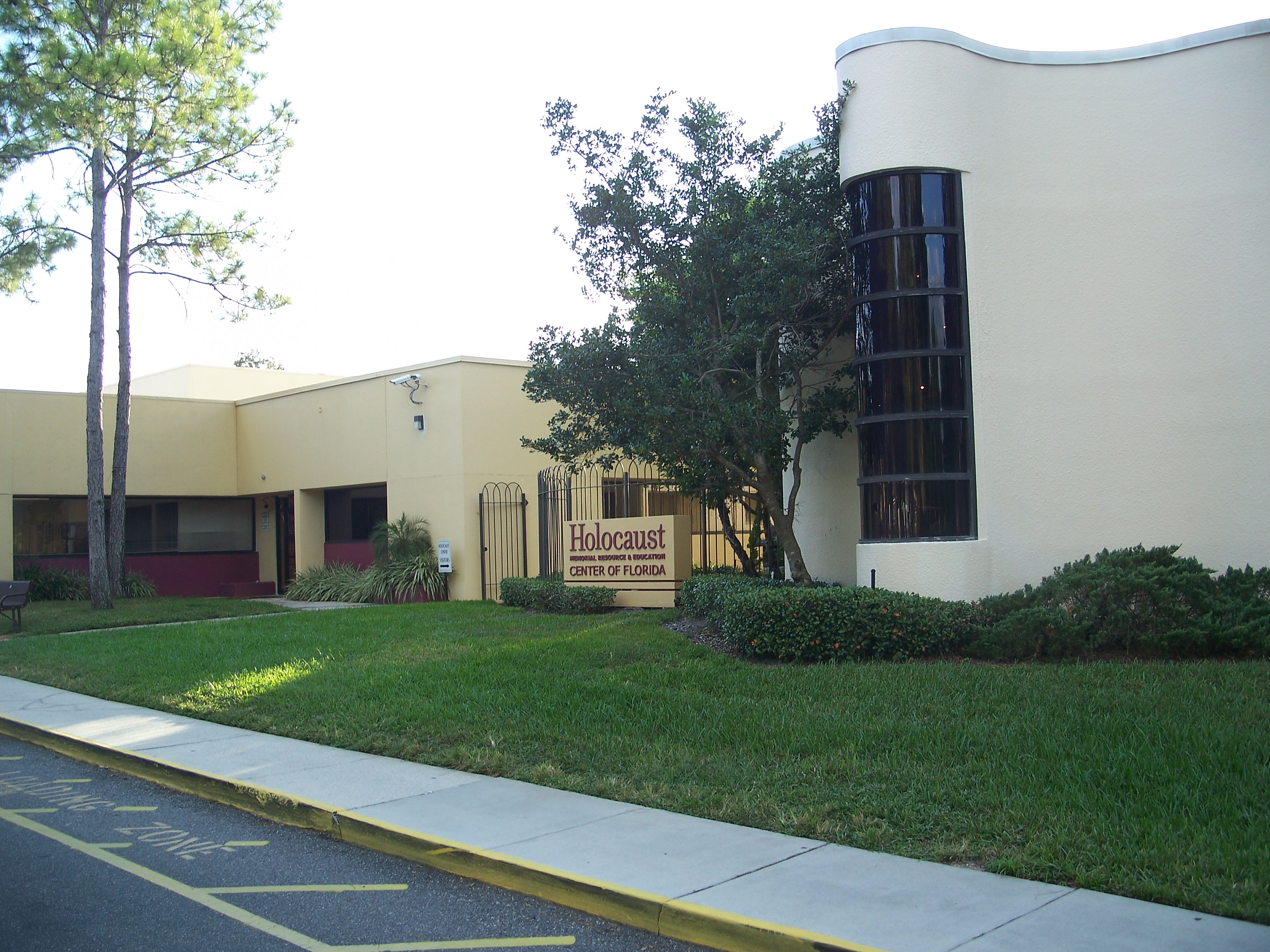
Maitland

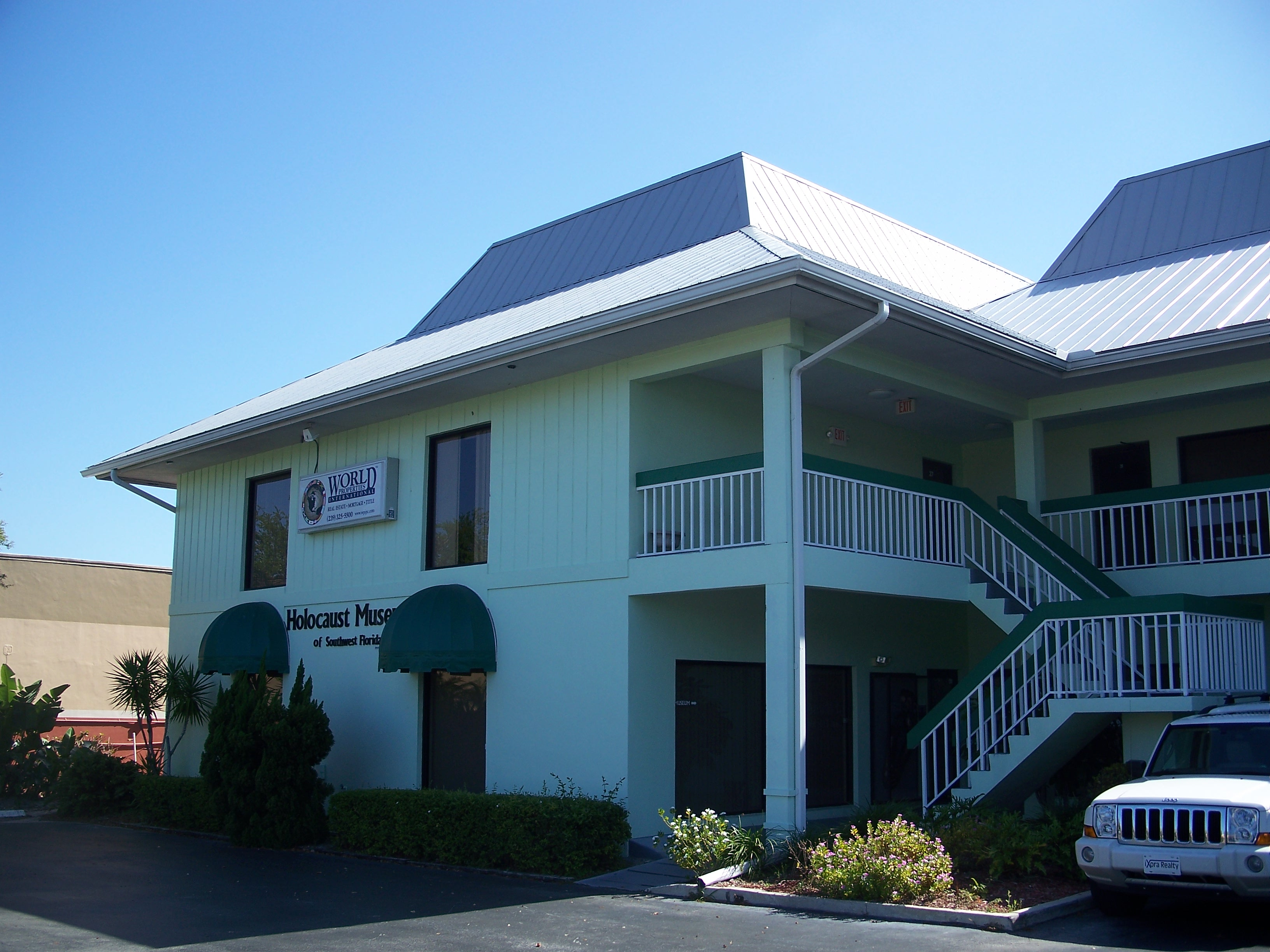
Naples

== Georgia ==
- The Kennesaw State University Museum of History and Holocaust Education (Kennesaw)
- The William Breman Jewish Heritage & Holocaust Museum (Atlanta)
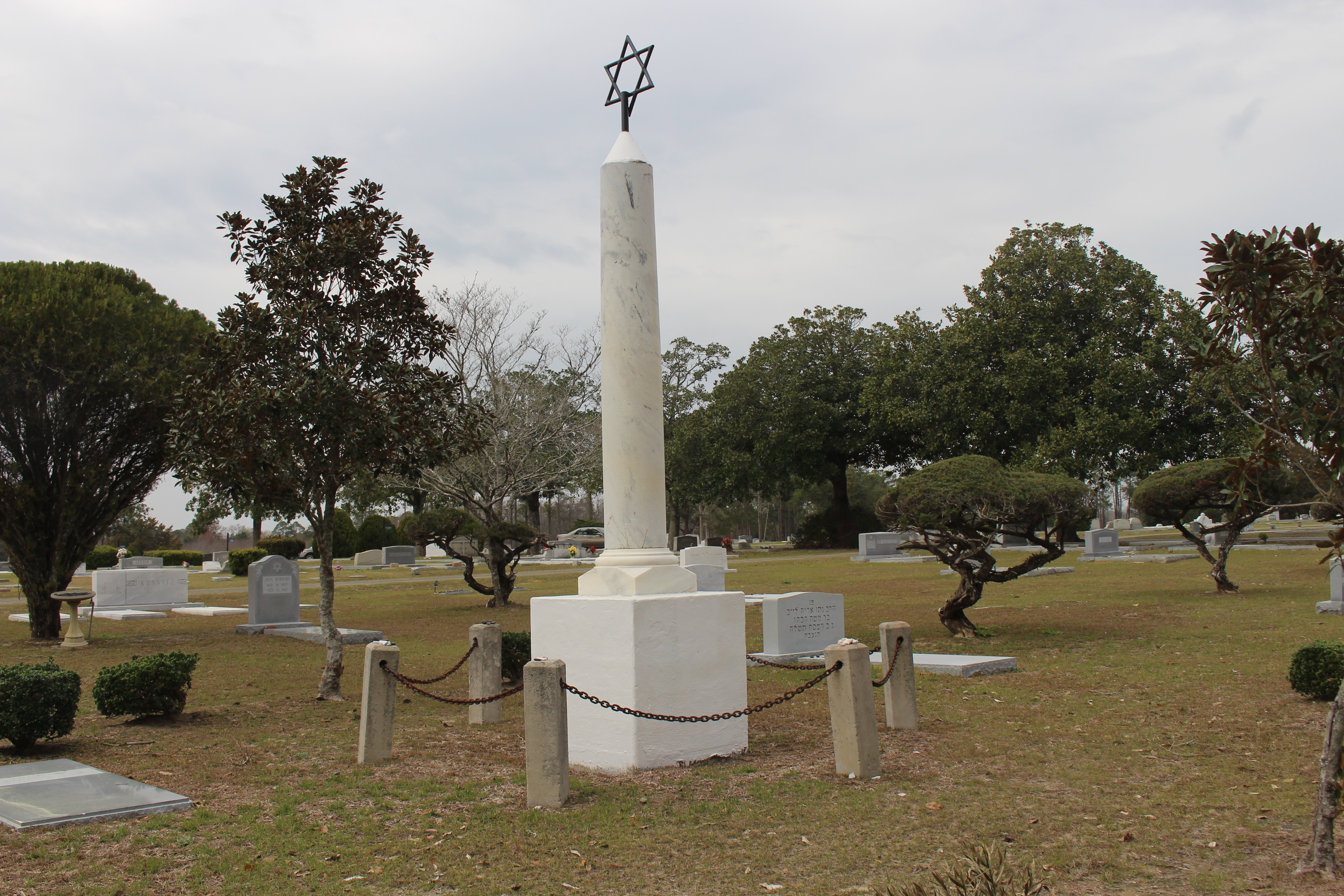
Six Million Hebrews monument in Evergreen Cemetery, Fitzgerald, Georgia

== Idaho ==
- Anne Frank Human Rights Memorial (Boise)

== Illinois ==
- Illinois Holocaust Museum and Education Center (Skokie)
- Peoria Holocaust Memorial (Peoria)
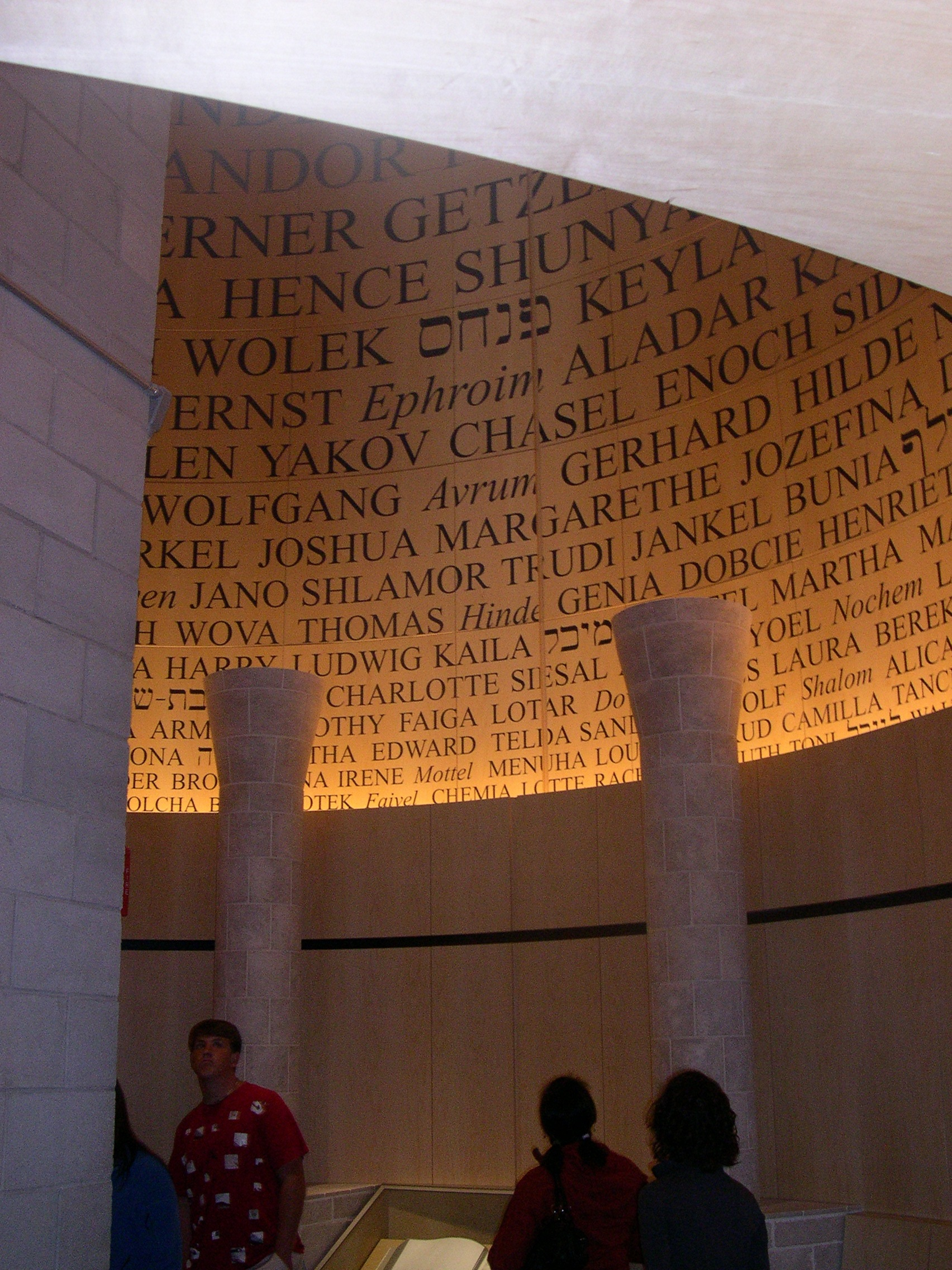

== Indiana ==
- CANDLES Holocaust Museum and Education Center (Terre Haute)

== Louisiana ==
- New Orleans Holocaust Memorial at Woldenberg Park,

sculpture by Yaacov Agam.

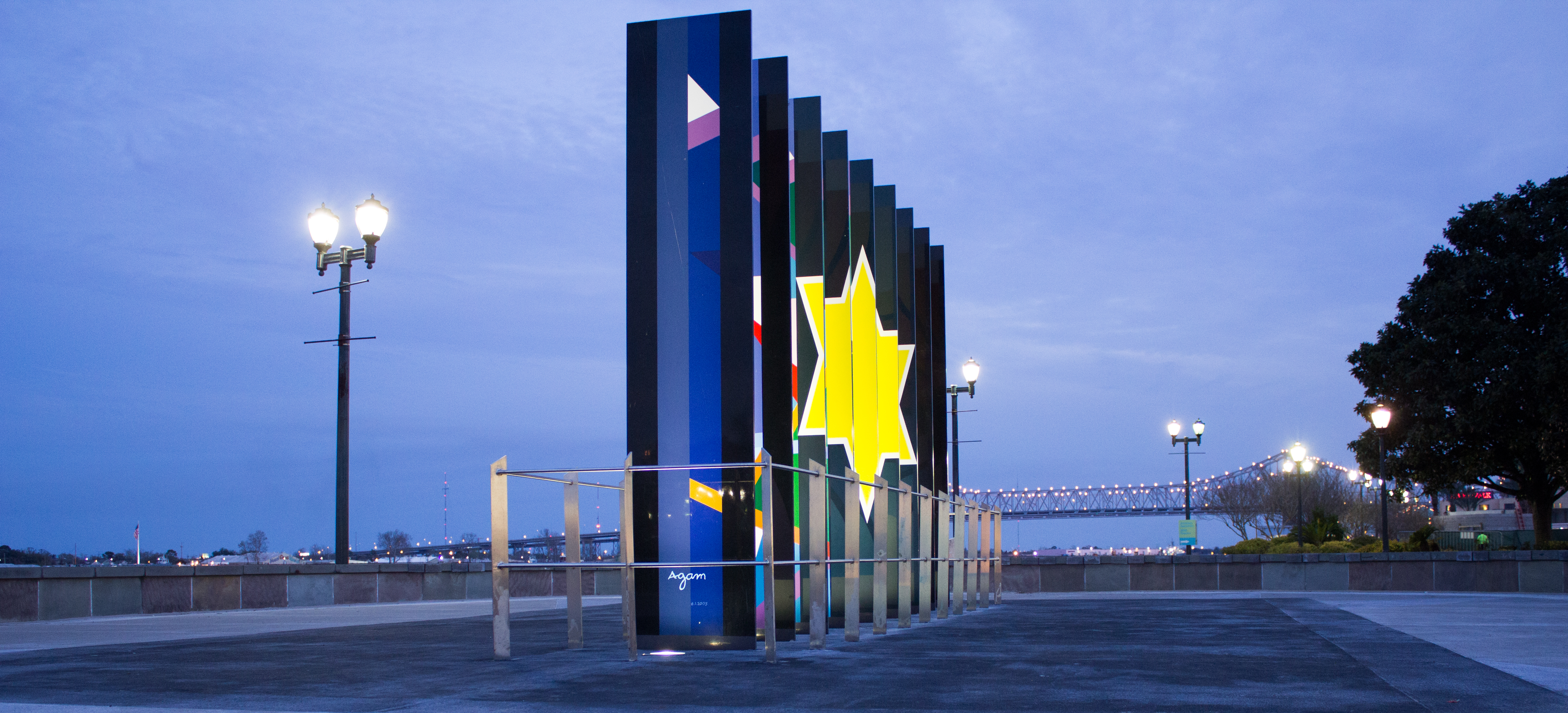
- Alexandria Holocaust Memorial, Holocaust Memorial Park

== Maine ==
- The Holocaust and Human Rights Center of Maine (Augusta)

== Maryland ==
- The Baltimore Holocaust Memorial
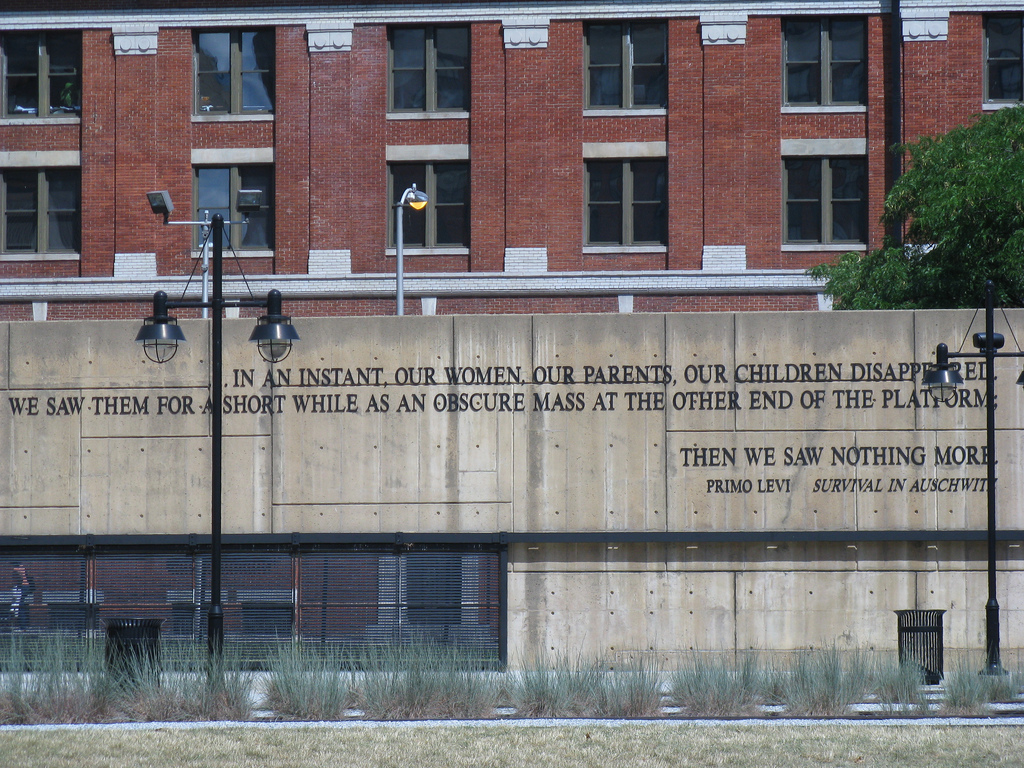

== Massachusetts ==
- The New England Holocaust Memorial (Boston)
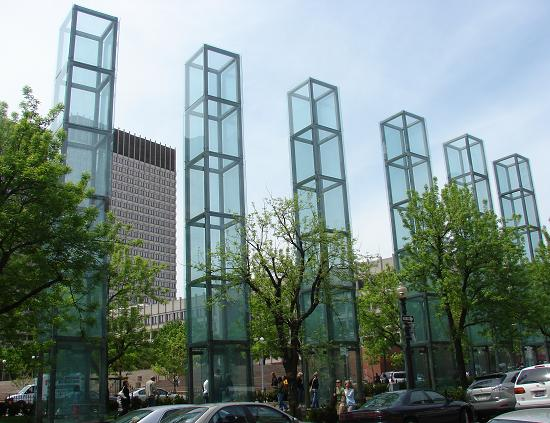
- "A Reason to Remember: Roth, Germany 1933-1942", a permanent exhibit, is housed at the Institute for Holocaust, Genocide, and Memory Studies at the University of Massachusetts Amherst.

== Michigan ==
- The Holocaust Memorial Center (Farmington Hills)
- University of Michigan Holocaust Memorial, Raoul Wallenberg Plaza (Ann Arbor)

sculpture by Leonard Baskin

- Holocaust Memorial, Oakview Cemetery (Royal Oak)
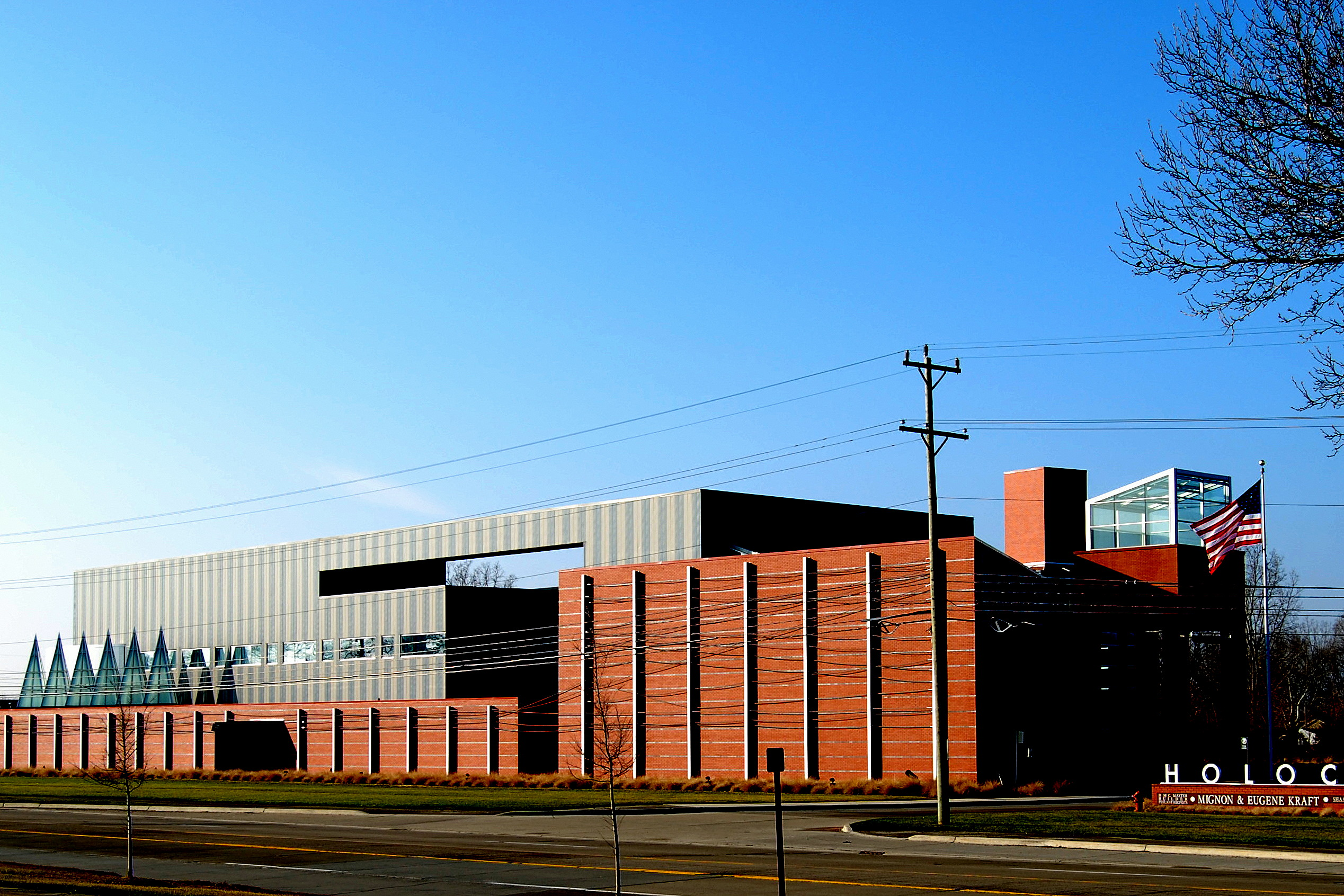
Holocaust Memorial Center

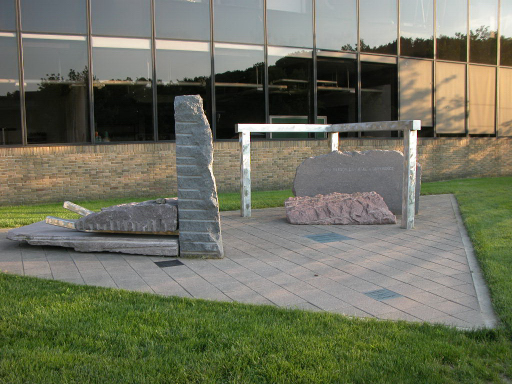
Ann Arbor

== Mississippi ==
- Holocaust Memorial (Clarksdale)
- Unknown Child Foundation (Hernando)

== Missouri ==
- Kaplan Feldman Holocaust Museum (St. Louis)

== Nebraska ==
- The Nebraska Holocaust Memorial (Lincoln)

== New Hampshire ==
- New Hampshire Holocaust Memorial (Nashua)

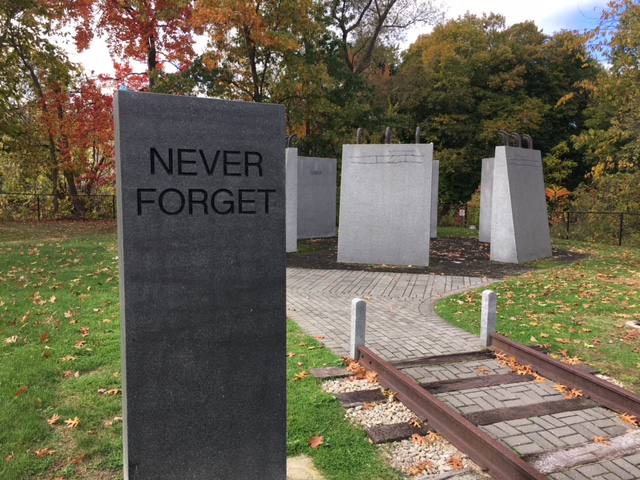
Nashua, New Hampshire – Holocaust Memorial – 2013

== New Jersey ==
=== Museums and institutions ===
- Esther Raab Holocaust Museum & Goodwin Education Center, Cherry Hill
- The Jewish Foundation for the Righteous (Manhattan)
- Sara & Sam Schoffer Holocaust Resource Center, Galloway
- Fort Lee Holocaust Museum

=== Monuments ===
- South Jersey Holocaust memorial, Alliance cemetery (Norma)
- Camden County Holocaust Memorial (Cherry Hill) dedicated June 7, 1981
- Liberation, Liberty State Park (Jersey City)
- Holocaust memorial at Congregation Sons of Israel synagogue, 590 Madison Ave (Lakewood)
- (Proposed) Northern New Jersey Holocaust Memorial, Teaneck Municipal Green (Teaneck)
- Hunterdon County Holocaust Memorial at The Flemington Jewish Community Center Cemetery on Capner St. (Flemington)

=== Markers ===
- Holocaust marker at the Bergen County Court House (Hackensack)
- Holocaust marker at the Fair Lawn Municipal Building (Fair Lawn)

== New Mexico ==
- The New Mexico Holocaust & Intolerance Museum, Albuquerque
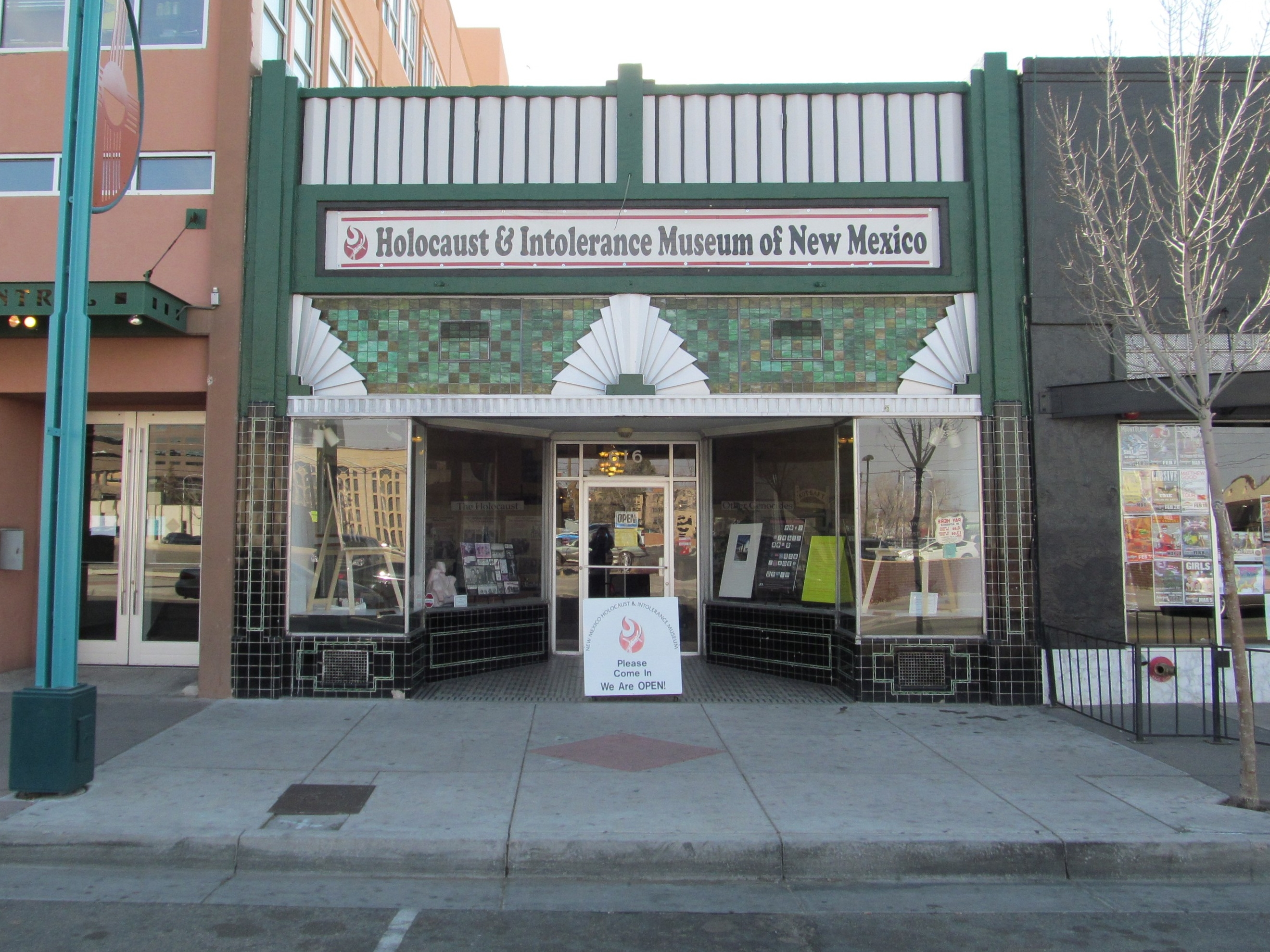

== New York ==
=== Museums and institutions ===
- Amud Aish Memorial Museum (Brooklyn)
- Museum of Jewish Heritage – A Living Memorial to the Holocaust (Battery Park City, Manhattan)
- Holocaust Memorial and Tolerance Center of Nassau County, Welwyn Preserve (Glen Cove, Long Island)
- Stuart Elenko Holocaust Museum at the Bronx High School of Science (Bronx)
- Safe Haven Holocaust Refugee Shelter Museum (Oswego)

=== Monuments ===
- The Holocaust Memorial Park (Brooklyn)
- Holocaust Memorial, City Hall Plaza (Long Beach)
- Memorial to Victims of the Injustice of the Holocaust: 1938–1945, Appellate Division of the New York State Supreme Court (Manhattan)
- (Proposed) The "Capital District Jewish Holocaust Memorial", 2501 Troy Schenectady Road (Niskayuna)
- Warsaw Ghetto Memorial Plaza in Riverside Park (Manhattan)
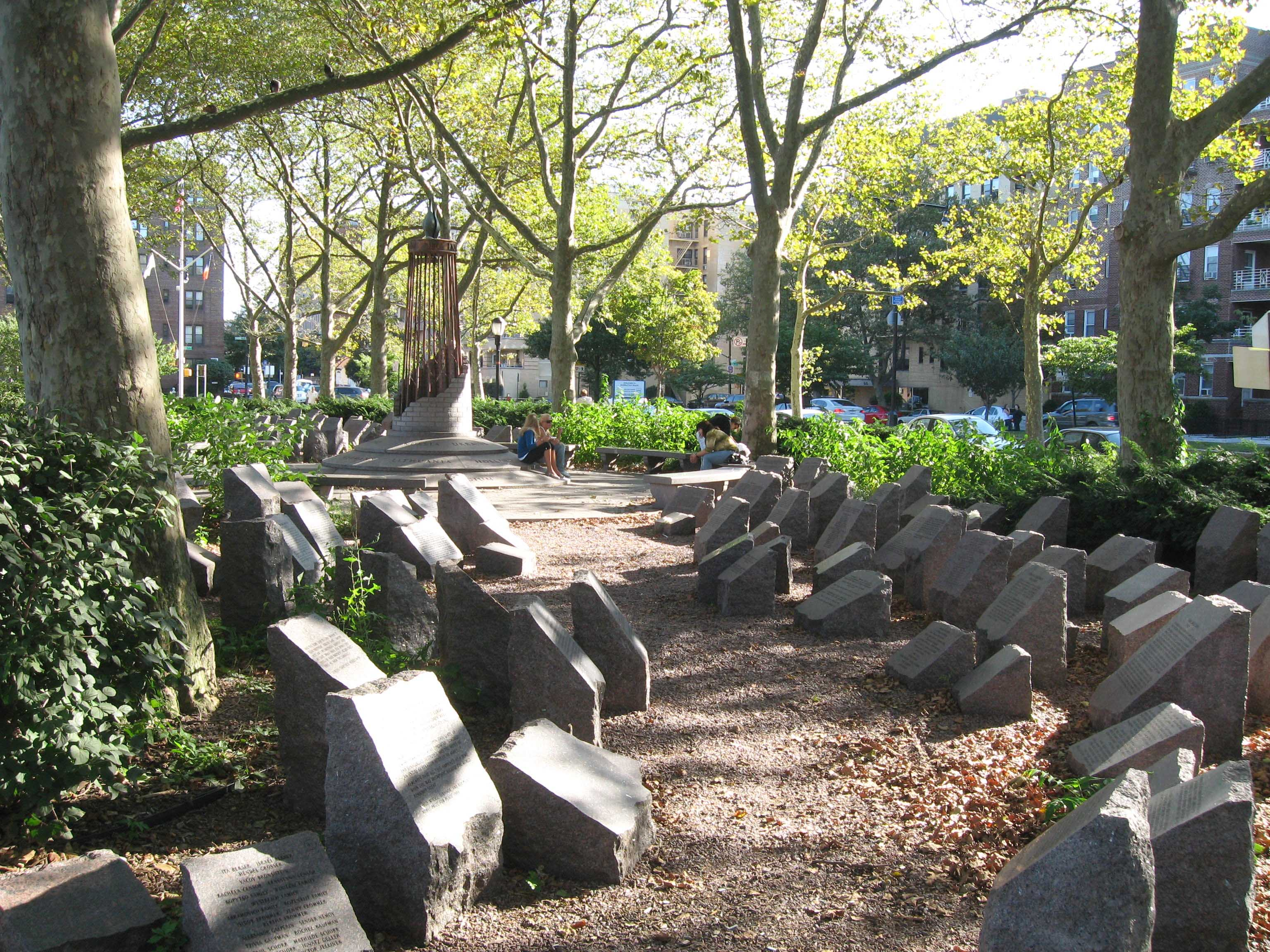
Holocaust Memorial Park

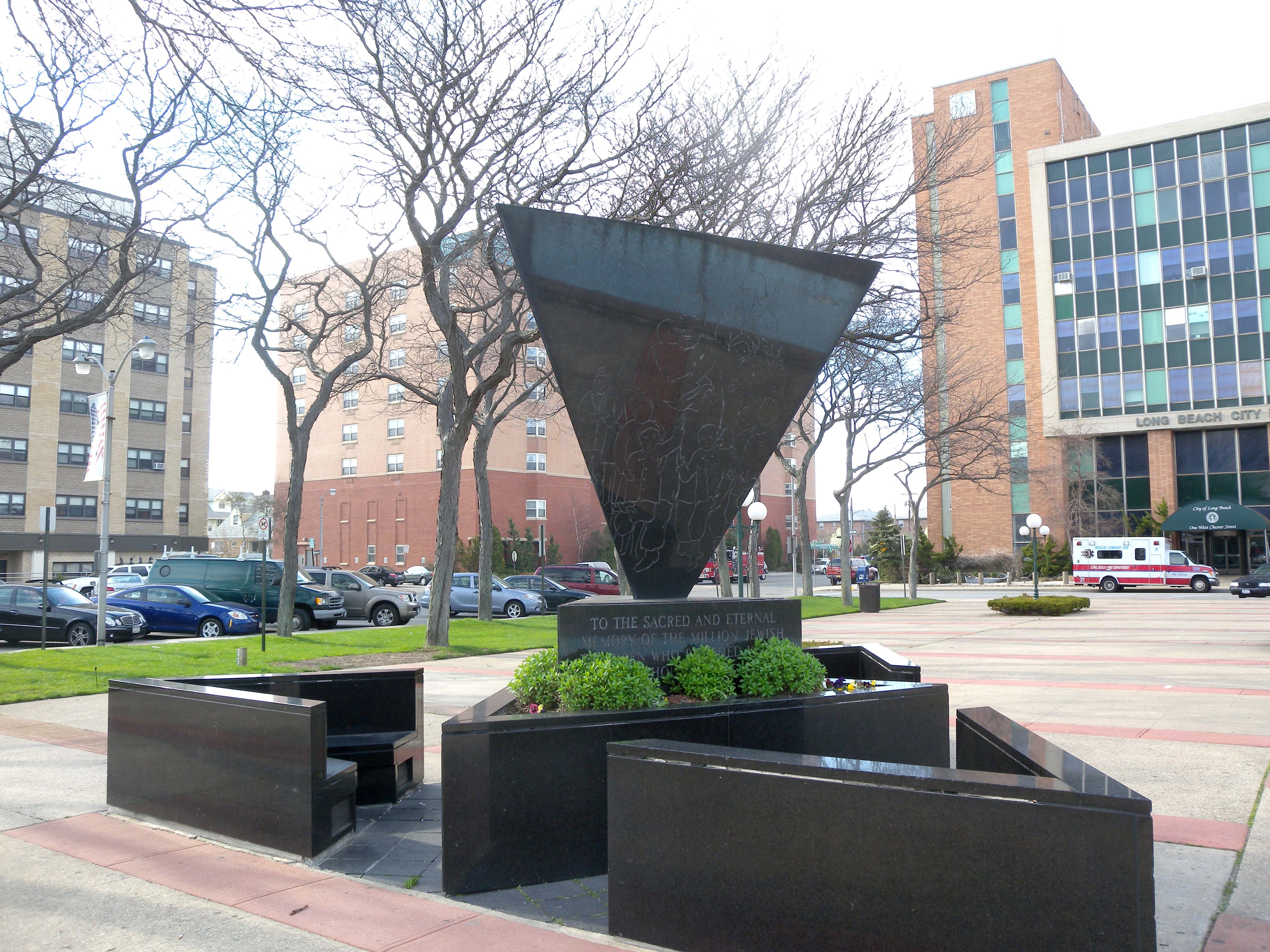
Long Beach

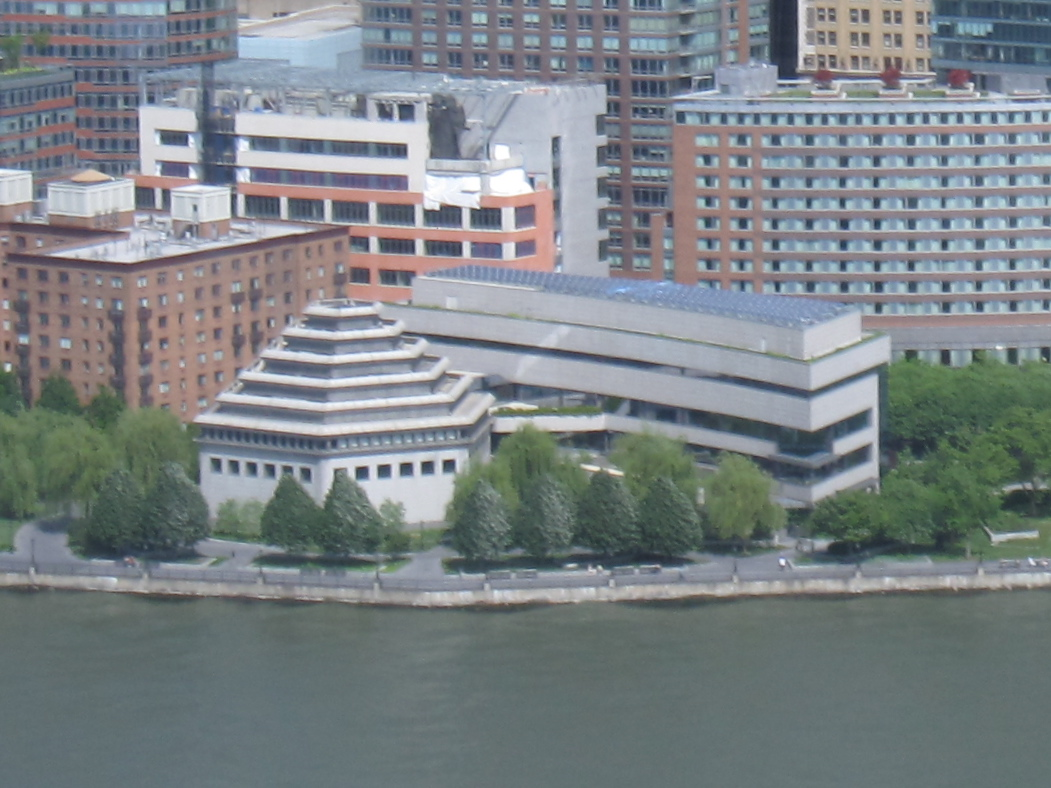
Museum of Jewish Heritage

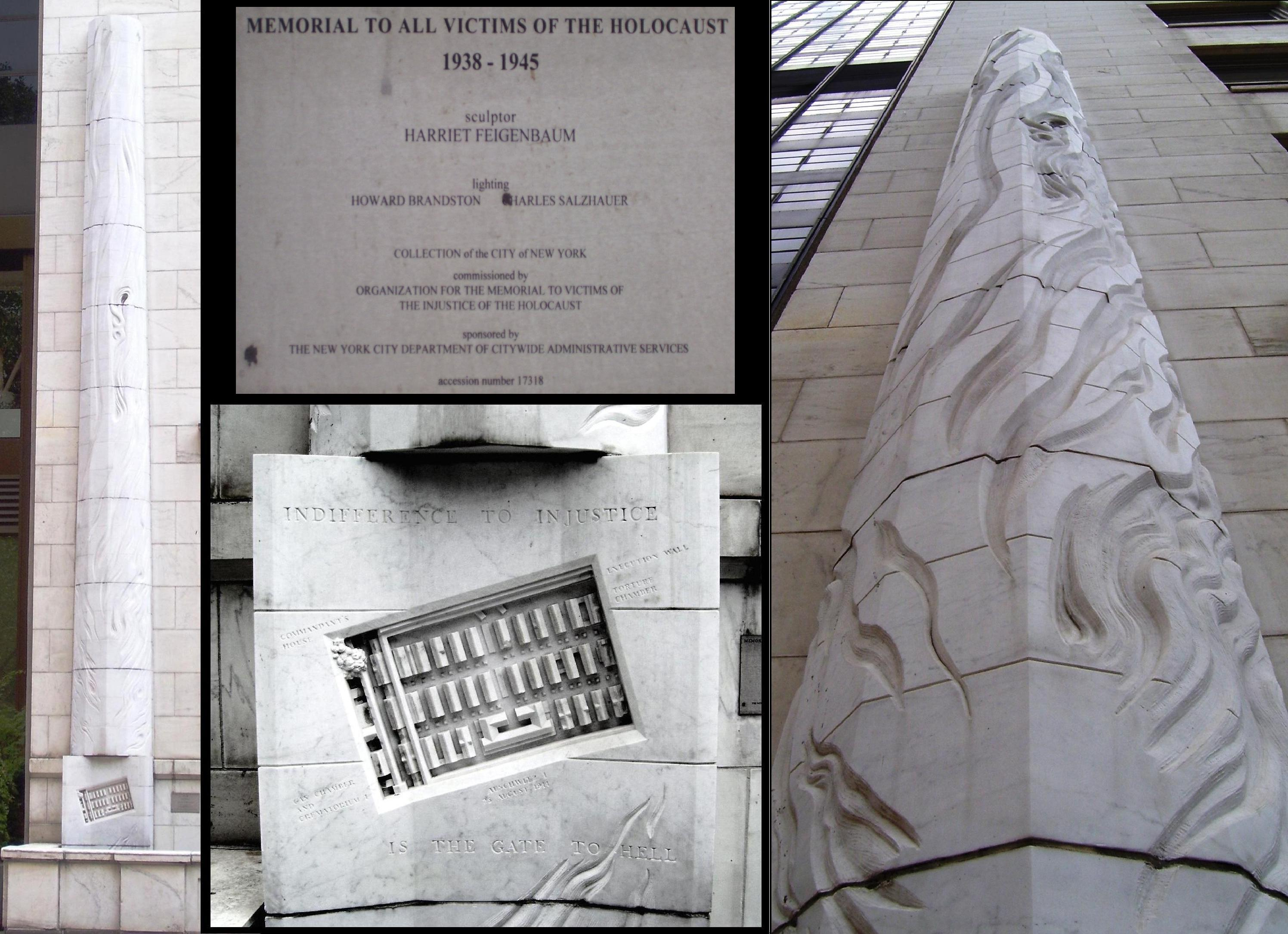
N.Y. State Supreme Court

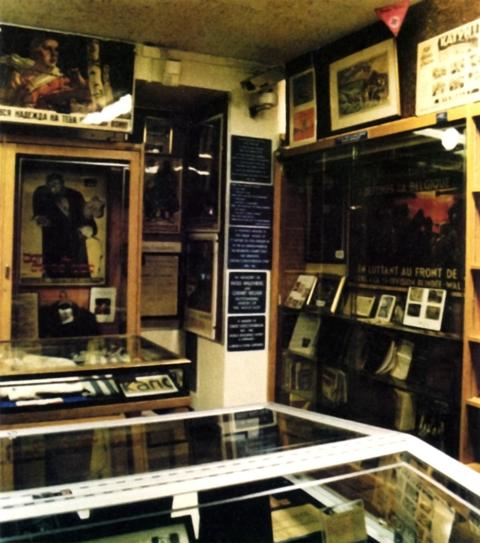
Stuart Elenko Holocaust Museum

== Ohio ==
- Ohio Holocaust and Liberators Memorial at the Ohio Statehouse (Columbus)
- “Promise For Life” sculpture on the Trinity Lutheran Seminary campus (Columbus)
- Nancy & David Wolf Holocaust & Humanity Center, Cincinnati Union Terminal (Cincinnati)
- Holocaust Memorial (Bedford Heights)
- Maltz Museum of Jewish Heritage (Beachwood)
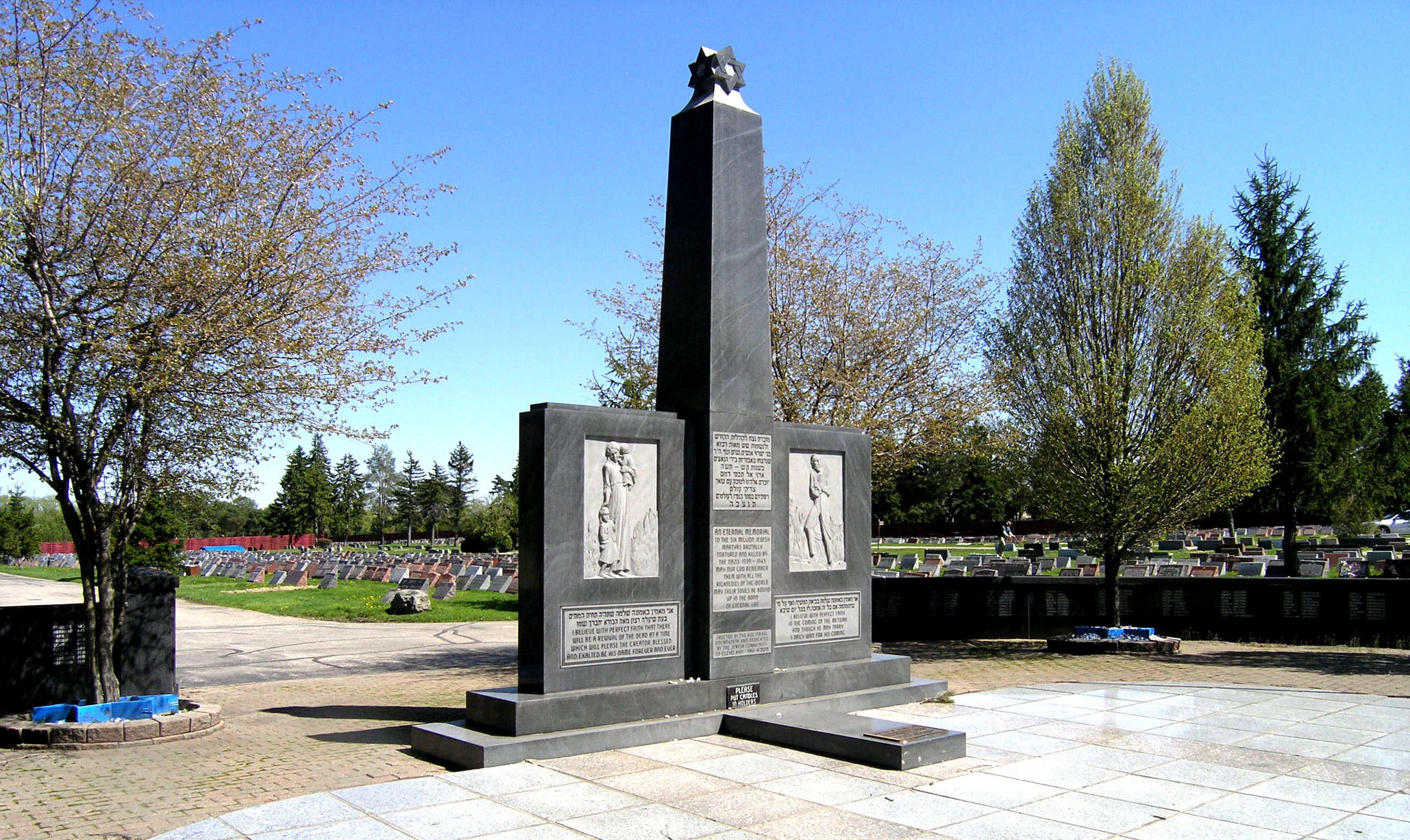
Cleveland

== Oklahoma ==
- The Sherwin Miller Museum of Jewish Art (Tulsa)

== Oregon ==
- Oregon Holocaust Memorial (Portland)
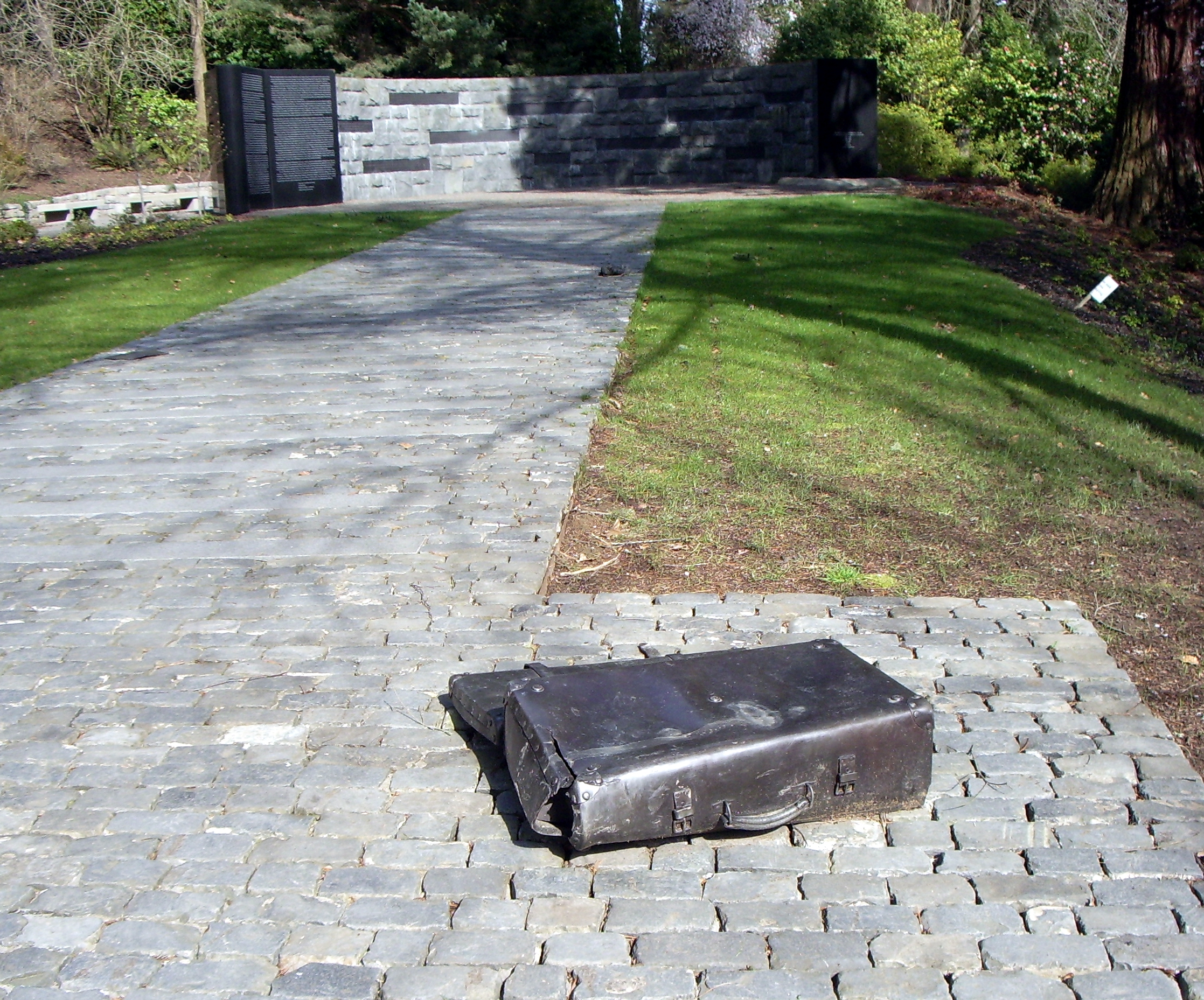

== Pennsylvania ==
- The Holocaust Awareness Museum and Education Center (Philadelphia)
- Holocaust Memorial (Harrisburg)
- Holocaust Center of Pittsburgh (Pittsburgh)
- The Horwitz-Wasserman Holocaust Memorial Plaza (Philadelphia)
  - Memorial to the Six Million Jewish Martyrs
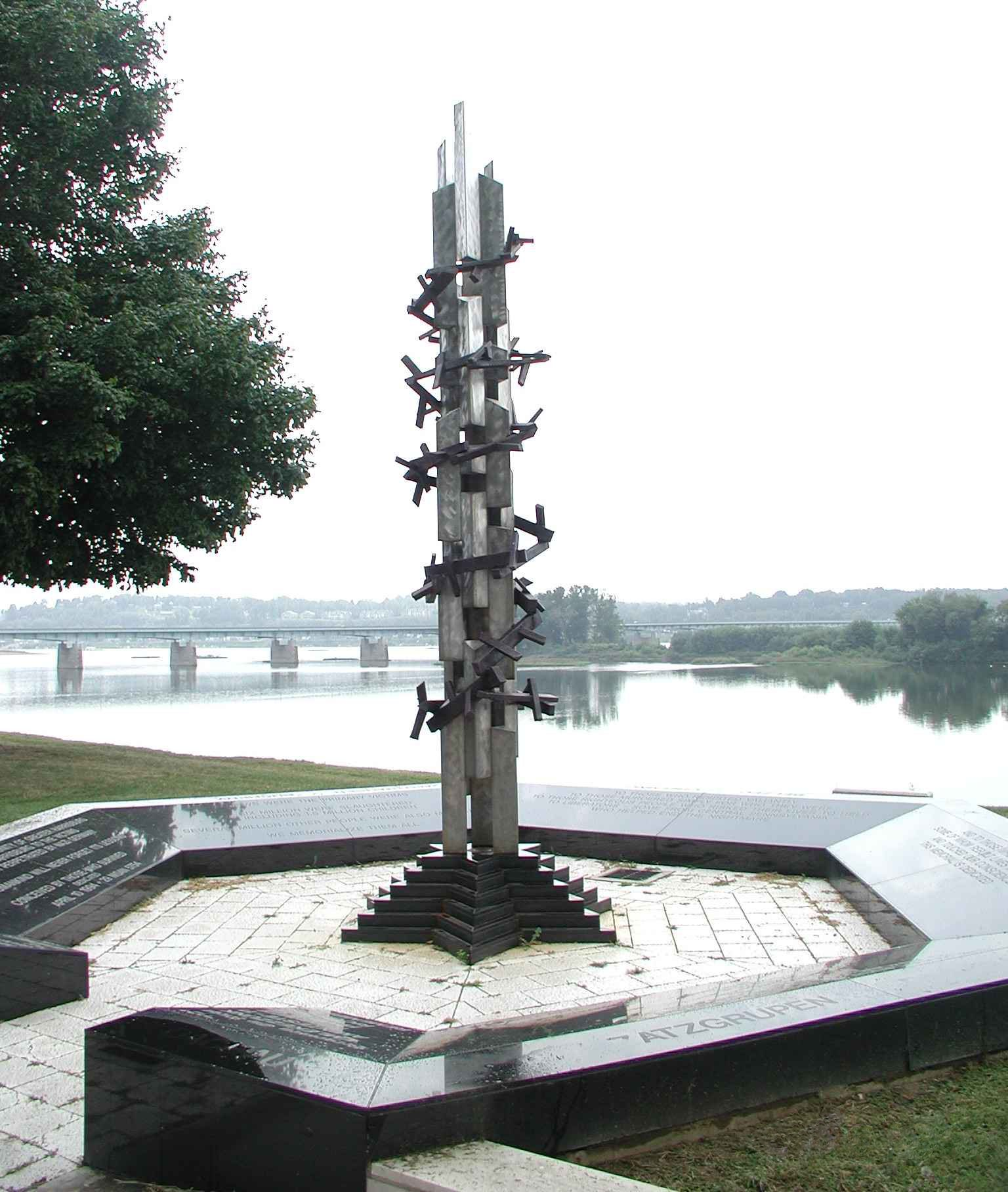
Harrisburg

== Rhode Island ==
- Sandra Bornstein Holocaust Education Center (Providence)
- Rhode Island Holocaust Memorial Park (Providence)

== South Carolina ==
- Charleston Holocaust Memorial (Charleston)
- South Carolina Holocaust Memorial (700 Hampton Street, Columbia)

== Tennessee ==
- Nashville Holocaust Memorial (Nashville)
- The Children's Holocaust Memorial and Paper Clip Project at Whitwell Middle School (Whitwell)

== Texas ==
- The Dallas Holocaust and Human Rights Museum
- The El Paso Holocaust Museum and Study Center
- The Holocaust History Project (San Antonio)
- Holocaust Museum Houston
- The Holocaust Memorial Museum of San Antonio
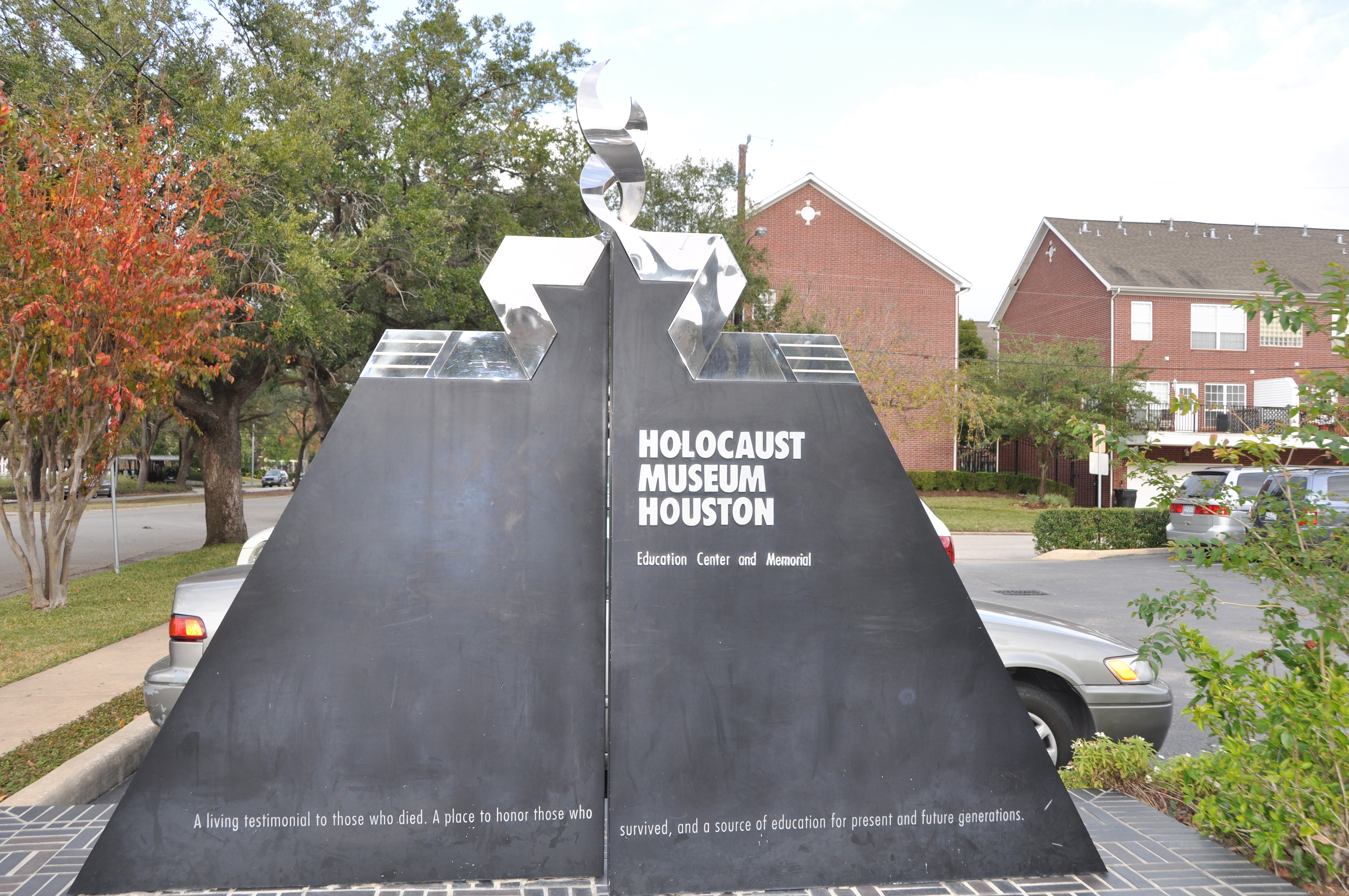
Houston

== Virginia ==
- Emek Sholom Holocaust Memorial Cemetery (Henrico)
- The Virginia Holocaust Museum (Richmond)
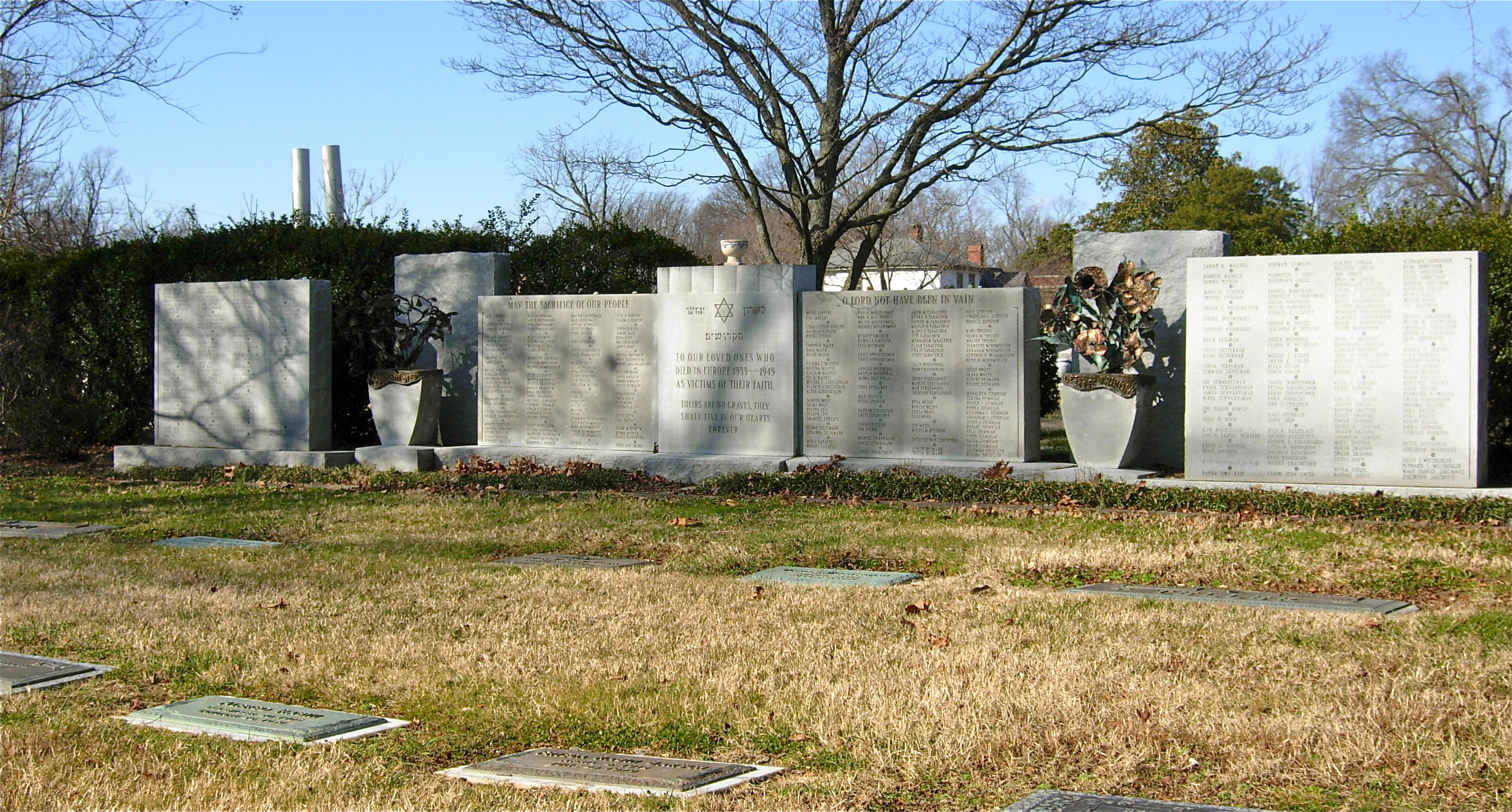
Emek Sholom

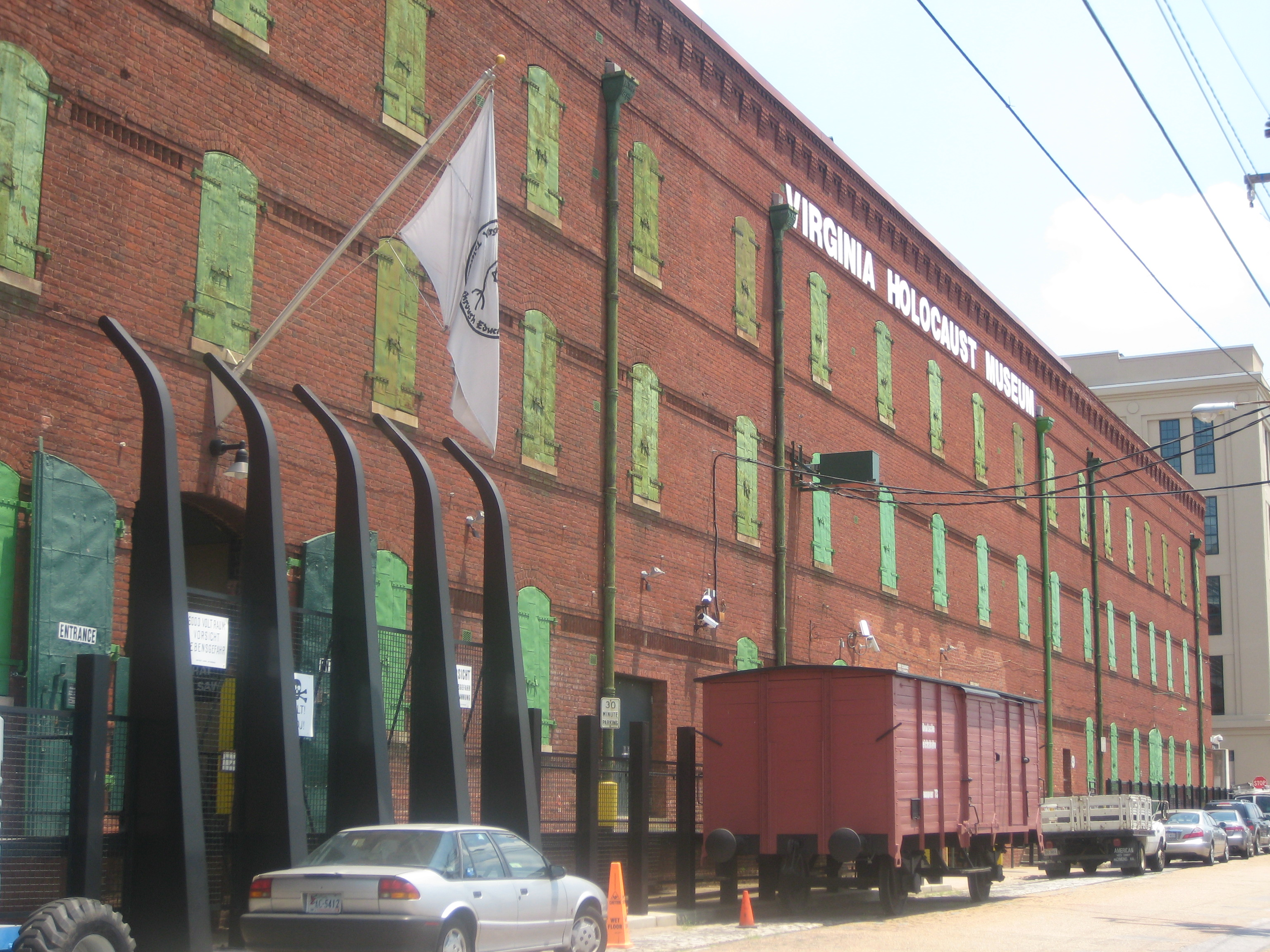
Richmond

== Washington ==
- Holocaust Center for Humanity (Seattle)

== Washington, D.C. ==
- The United States Holocaust Memorial Museum
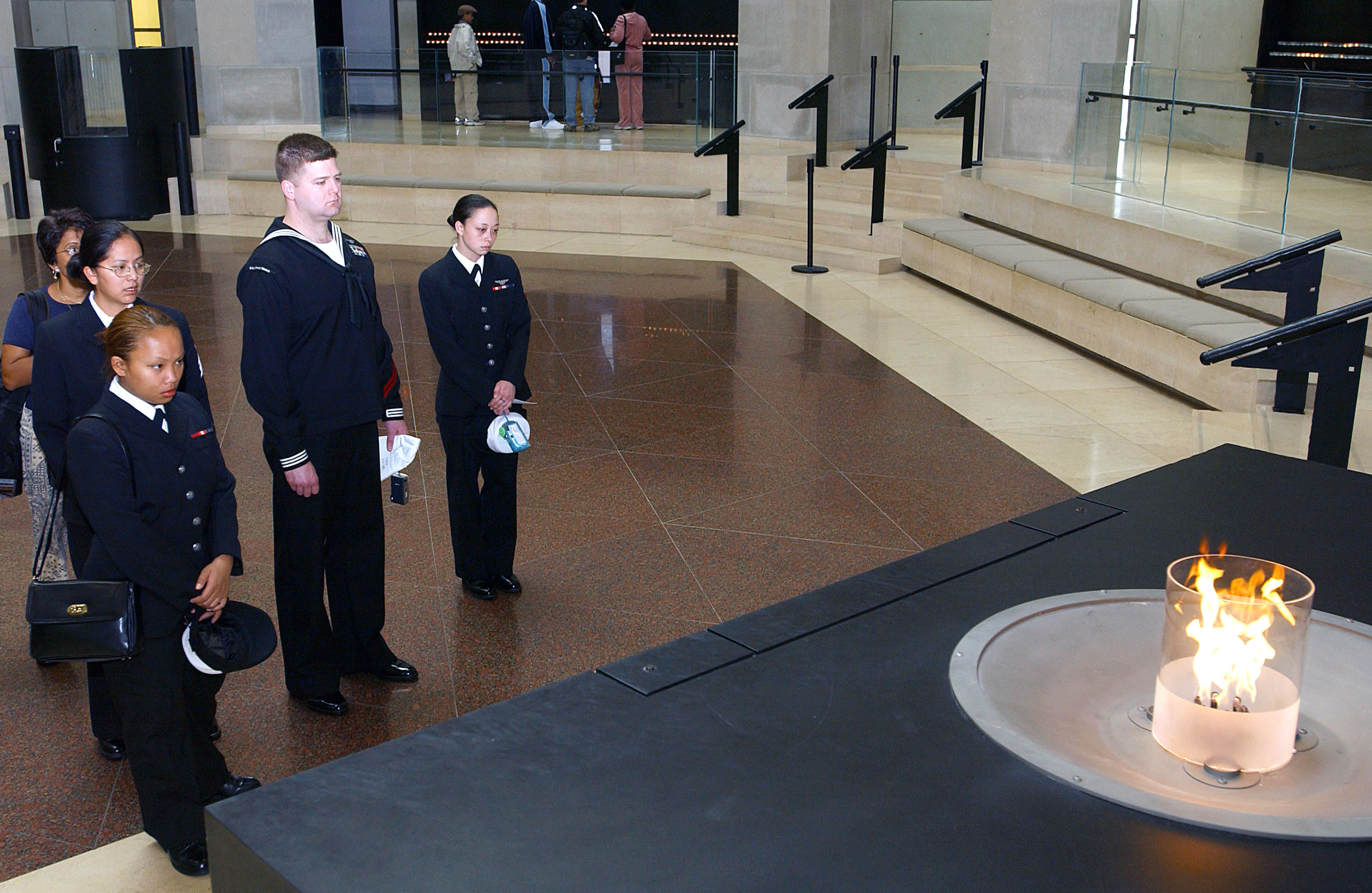

== Wisconsin ==
- Holocaust Memorial (Milwaukee)

== See also ==
- List of Holocaust memorials and museums — worldwide
