= Monuments in the United States to Nazi collaborators =

Statues that commemorate people who collaborated with Nazis

The United States has monuments to people who collaborated with the Nazis, that are located in New York, Illinois, Wisconsin, Ohio, Alabama, Georgia, and Michigan.

== Existing ==
=== Monuments to French collaborators ===
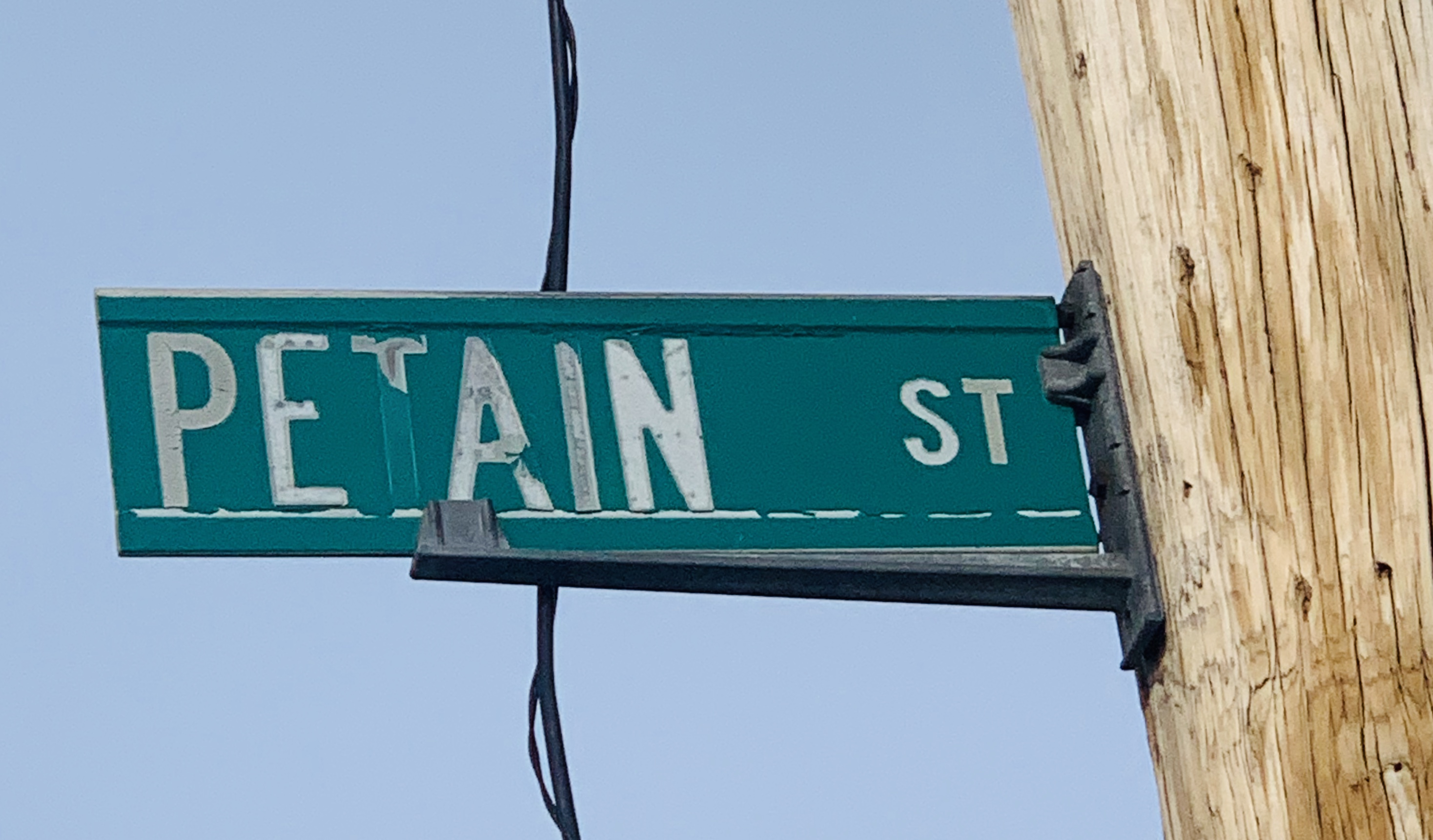
Petain Street Sign in Pinardville (part of Goffstown, New Hampshire), 2019

Two of the plaques installed in 2004 in the Canyon of Heroes on lower Broadway, New York City commemorating a 1931 ticker-tape parade, are for the French then-to-be Nazi collaborators Philippe Pétain and Pierre Laval. Pétain and Laval led the Vichy Regime, one of the puppet governments of Nazi Germany. During their time in charge, the Vichy government deported about 76,000 Jews to the Auschwitz concentration camp in occupied Poland.

As of 2026, there were streets in ten US towns and cities named after Pétain, in:

- Hartselle, Alabama;
- Prichard, Alabama;
- Yuma, Colorado;
- Abbeville, Louisiana;
- Monroe, Louisiana;
- Goffstown, New Hampshire;
- Defiance, Ohio;
- Ellwood City, Pennsylvania;
- Nemacolin, Pennsylvania; and
- Dallas, Texas.

Unlike other Nazi collaborators, Pétain is unique insofar as nearly all monuments to him were created before he collaborated with Nazis, as a result of his World War I activities. France renamed all streets that were named after him by 2011, and plans to honour him by French president Emmanuel Macron were reversed in 2018, after a public outcry.

=== Monuments to Ukrainian collaborators ===
There are two monuments in the US to two Ukrainian nationalists, Stepan Bandera and Roman Shukhevych, who collaborated with the Nazis. Bandera was a leader of Organization of Ukrainian Nationalists who collaborated with the Nazis in 1941 before being imprisoned by them and again in 1944 after his release. Shukhevych was one of the leaders of the Ukrainian Insurgent Army, which took part in the massacres of Poles in Volhynia and Eastern Galicia, and one of the commanders of Nachtigall Battalion, Hauptmann of the German Schutzmannschaft 201 auxiliary police battalion, which participated in the Lviv pogroms against Jews.

A Ukrainian Youth Association in Baraboo near Wisconsin Dells has monuments to Stepan Bandera and Roman Shukhevych. The location made news in 2018 when a photograph of youths doing Nazi salutes circulated online.

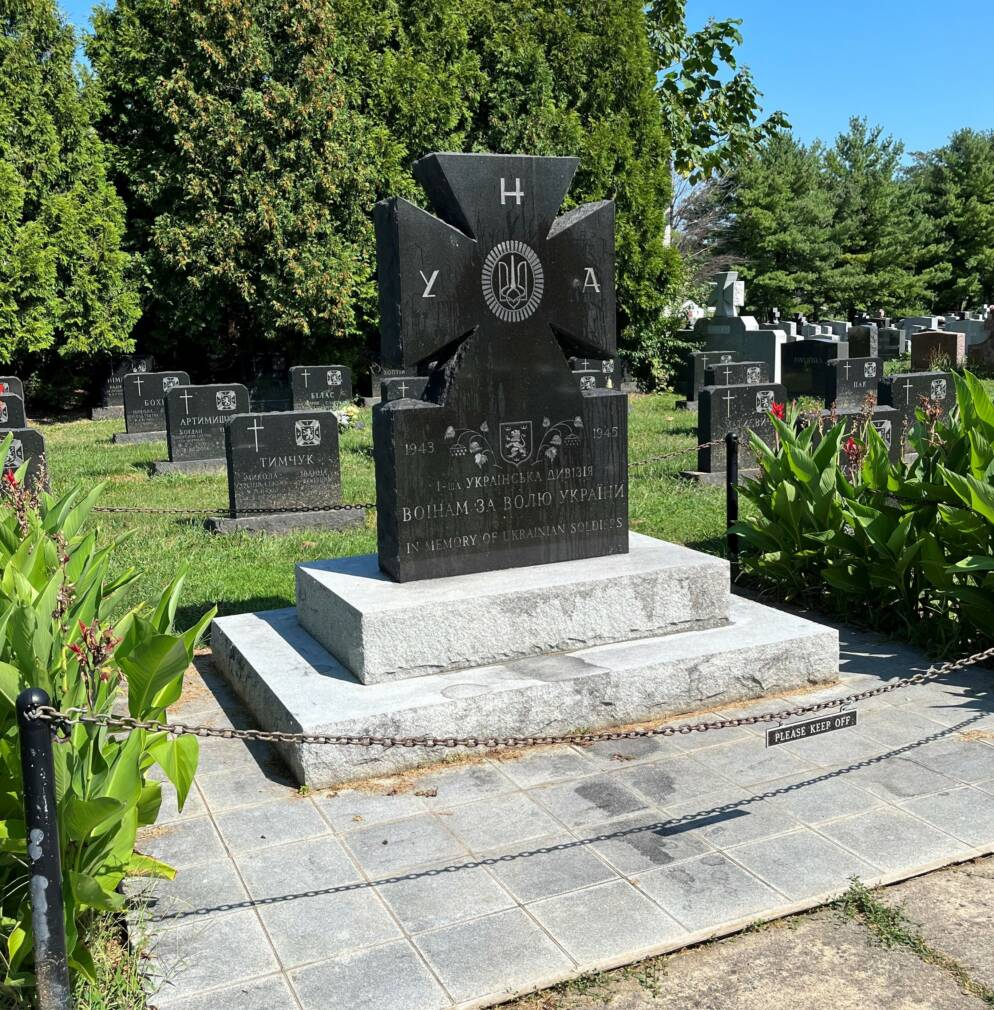
Monument to the 14th Waffen Grenadier Division of the SS in an Elkins Park Cemetery

The "Heroes" monument in Ellenville incorporates busts of Shukhevych and Bandera. A monument to Organization of Ukrainian Nationalists and Ukrainian Insurgent Army - two Ukrainian nationalist organisations which allied with the Nazis against the USSR - was unveiled in Hamptonburgh in 1989.

There is a monument in the United States commemorating personnel of the 14th Waffen Grenadier Division of the SS (1st Galician), a Ukrainian Waffen-SS formation established by Nazi Germany in 1943. The division was organized as part of the Waffen-SS and recruited predominantly from Ukrainian volunteers in Galicia. In the final weeks of the Second World War, it was reorganized as the 1st Division of the Ukrainian National Army.

A cross dedicated to the division stands at Saint Mary's Ukrainian Catholic Cemetery in Elkins Park, Pennsylvania, near Philadelphia. The American Jewish Committee has called for the monument's removal, citing the division's association with the Waffen-SS and its wartime record.

=== Monuments to Russian collaborators ===
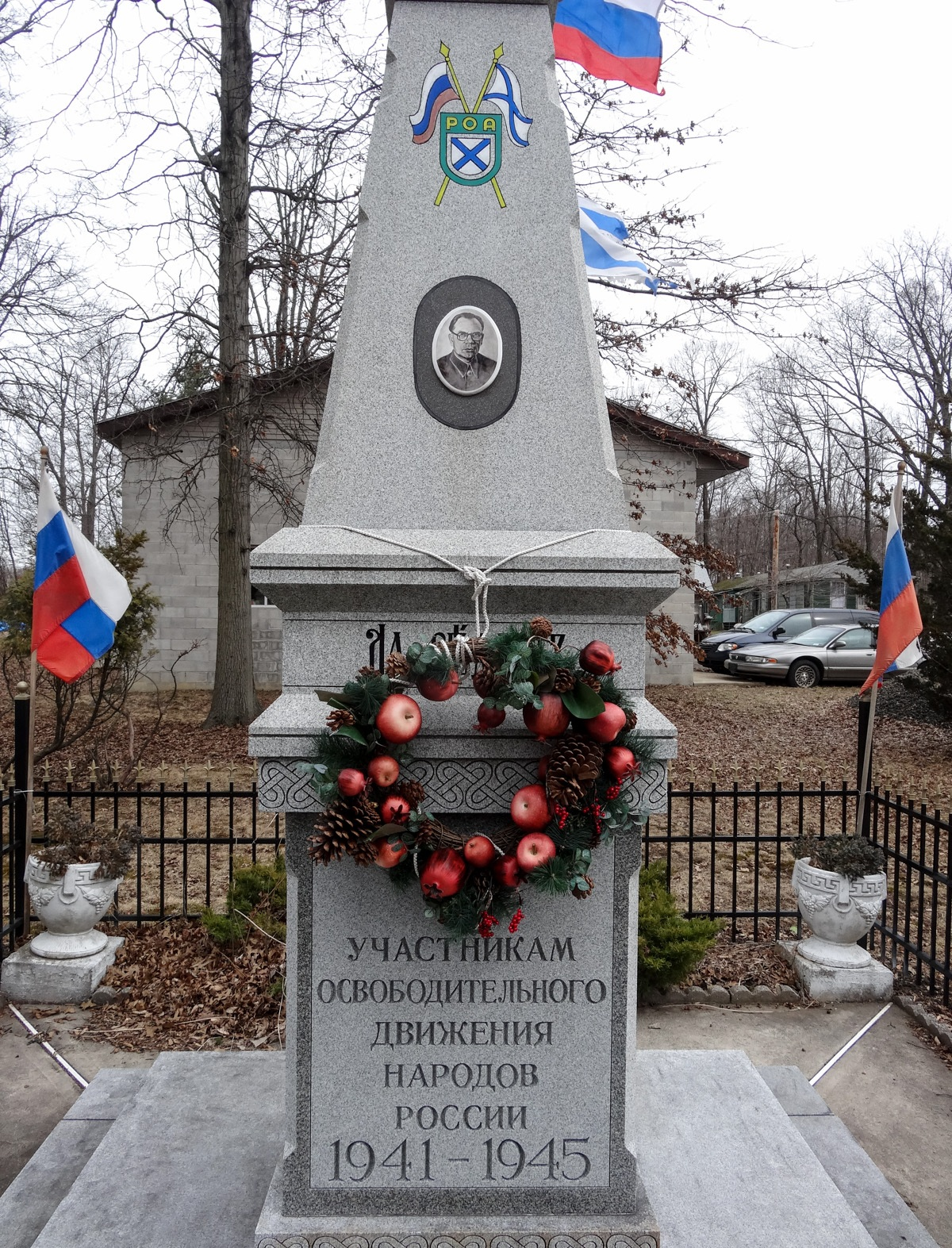
Vlasov memorial, Nanuet, New York.

A monument to the Russian Liberation Army and Soviet General Andrey Vlasov is situated in the Novo-Diveevo Russian Orthodox convent in Nanuet, New York. Vlasov defected from the Red Army to the Nazis in 1942.

=== Monuments to Lithuanian collaborators ===
A monument to Adolfas Ramanauskas was erected in 2019 outside the Lithuanian World Center in Lemont, Illinois. Ramanauskas commanded one of the many Lithuanian Activist Front antisemitic "self-defence" groups. Initial plans to situate the monument on public land were halted in 2018 by local authorities.

=== Monuments to Serbian collaborators ===
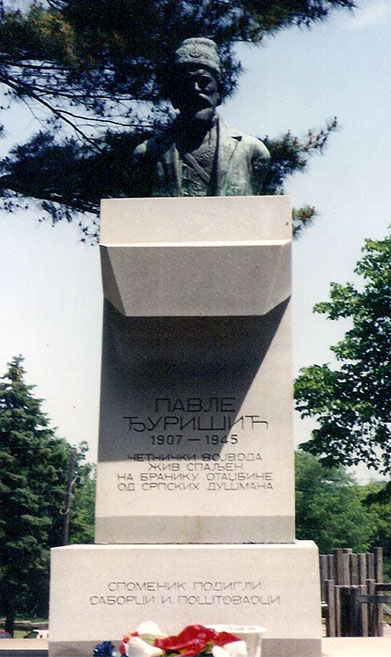
Đurišić monument Libertyville.

A bust of Pavle Đurišić is located in Chetnik Heroes Park, Saint Sava Serbian Orthodox Monastery and Seminary in Libertyville, Illinois. Đurišić was awarded the Iron Cross by the Nazis after his collaboration with them in Montenegro when he commanded the Chetnik troops.

Monuments to Chetniks founder Dragoljub Mihailović are located in six US cities including Cleveland, Ohio, Milwaukee, San Marcos, California and Libertyville, Illinois. Mihailović collaborated with the Nazis and his organization both murdered Jews and deported them to the Nazis. He was executed by the Yugoslav government for his collaboration with Adolf Hitler.

=== Monuments to German Nazis and German collaborators ===
A Wernher von Braun quote is displayed the U.S. Space and Rocket Center in Huntsville, Alabama. Von Braun was a key part of Operation Paperclip that imported Nazi scientists to help construct US weapons after World War II. During WWII, as an SS officer, von Braun oversaw the construction of V-2 rockets for the Nazis, using labour from the Mittelbau-Dora concentration camp.

Huntsville has several other monuments to von Braun owned by the federal government, state government and municipal government. The City of Huntsville owns an entertainment complex called the Von Braun Center. There is a plaque to Von Braun outside the centre, which includes an ice rink and a concert hall. A street in Huntsville is known as Von Braun Drive Northwest. The public University of Alabama has a Wernher Von Braun Research Hall. The university's website lauds von Braun and is silent on his Nazi history. The Redstone Arsenal near Huntsville has a Von Braun Complex used mostly by the Missile Defense Agency.

The Dr. Kurt H. Debus Conference Facility located within Kennedy Space Center in Merritt Island, Florida is named after Kurt H. Debus, who was the centre's inaugural director after working as a Nazi scientist and exploiting labour from concentration camps.

== Removed ==
=== Monuments to French collaborators ===
The City of Milltown, New Jersey renamed Petain Avenue to Haig Avenue. The street was named for Pétain in the interwar period before his Nazi collaboration.

=== Monuments to German Nazis and German collaborators ===
The city of Herndon, Virginia renamed Ferdinand Porsche Drive to Woodland Pointe Avenue in October 2022. Ferdinand Porsche, a Nazi Party member, designed cars and weapons, including the Tiger Tank and used slave labour at the Porsche factory in Stuttgart.

== See also ==
- Memorials in Canada to Nazis and Nazi collaborators
- List of Holocaust memorials and museums in the United States
