= Shore Boulevard Mall =

Promenade in Brooklyn, New York

Coordinates: 40°34′52.4″N 73°56′38.7″W

Shore Boulevard Mall is a waterfront promenade extending for nearly a mile along the southern bank of Sheepshead Bay in the Manhattan Beach neighborhood of Brooklyn, New York.

Residential development began in the area in 1907, following the decline of local racetracks and hotels. Along the northern side of the Manhattan Beach peninsula, Shore Boulevard was constructed in 1907 in a manner resembling a parkway, with a wide shoulder along the water's edge containing rows of trees and a pedestrian path with benches overlooking Sheephead Bay.

At the eastern tip of Manhattan Beach, Kingsborough Community College occupies the former site of a United States Coast Guard station; while the western end of Shore Boulevard contains Holocaust Memorial Park, which contains a monument completed in 1997 to commemorate victims of Nazi persecution. Between these two sites, the Ocean Avenue Footbridge connects Shore Boulevard Mall to mainland Brooklyn.
