= Claire Lieberman =

American artist

- Born: Milwaukee, Wisconsin
- Education: Tufts University/Boston Museum School (BFA), Pratt Institute (MFA)
- Known for: Sculpture, installation, prints, video, photography
- Awards: Cité International des Arts Paris - American Sculpture Studio, Yaddo, MacDowell, National Endowment for the Arts
- Website: www.clairelieberman.com

Claire Lieberman is an American artist known especially for her sculpture and installations, which explore the relationship between play and violence in contemporary culture. Her expansive body of work also includes prints, photographs, and a series of glass sculptures of toy guns. Her multidisciplinary art explores the relationship of toys and games to conflict in contemporary culture.

Lieberman's projects often center around the juxtaposition of disparate materials in a single sculpture or installation. She combines materials traditionally associated with sculpture, such as alabaster and marble, with contemporary mediums, like video, and other unexpected materials, such as Jell-O.

Art historian Nancy Princenthal wrote that “Claire Lieberman’s visually and conceptually elegant work occupies a field whose coordinates are innocence and violence, venerable craft and futuristic form. Her troublingly seductive sculptures represent danger disarmed by being bound in stone, and also by a streak of wily humor.”

Lieberman lives and works in Illinois and Brooklyn.

== Education and early career ==
Lieberman was born and raised in Milwaukee, Wisconsin. She was part of the first cohort of students at the Milwaukee Independent School, an experimental high school at which students and faculty collaboratively developed innovative learning practices. Lieberman earned her BFA from the School of the Museum of Fine Arts of Boston at Tufts University and her MFA with distinction from the Pratt Institute (1996).

In 1978, she received a Clarissa Bartlett Traveling Scholarship from the Boston Museum School and studied stone carving at the Istituto Professionale Industriale E Artigianato in Carrara, Italy. After returning to the United States, Lieberman taught at The Art Institute of Boston, maintaining a studio in Boston's Fort Point area. Between 1982 and 1984, Lieberman was granted the American Sculpture Studio in Paris at the Cité Internationale des Arts, American Sculpture Studio. After a solo exhibition at van Straaten Gallery, Chicago (1984), she moved to New York, where she developed a studio in Brooklyn. In 1990, she held a solo show while an artist-in-residence at the New York Studio School.

== Exhibitions ==
Lieberman's work has been exhibited widely, including international in museums and venues such as Mudac Museum in Lausanne, Switzerland; Galleri F-15, Norway; Galerie ACC Weimar, Weimar, Germany; Forum Schlossplatz, Aarau, Switzerland; and the Seoul Art Center, Seoul, Korea.

Lieberman's art has been exhibited in solo shows across the United States in galleries such as Massey Klein Gallery, New York; Pamela Auchincloss Project Space, 56 Bleecker, LTD, Hot Woods Art Center, Anderson Gallery at Virginia Commonwealth University, and Martin Art Gallery, Muhlenberg College.

In addition to solo shows, Lieberman's work has been exhibited in group shows with other leading contemporary artists. Her video project, Walking thru Jell-O, was shown at the Chelsea Art Museum (The Food Show — The Hungry Eye, 2007) alongside work by Roy Lichtenstein, Laurie Simmons, Wayne Thiebaud, Rirkrit Tiravanija, and Andy Warhol. Another notable group exhibition which featured Lieberman's work centered around how artists interpret the design, functionality, and cultural impact of firearms [citation] Up in Arms, was exhibited at Parker's Box in Brooklyn (2003).

== Themes in her work ==
Lieberman's sculptures, photographs, and installations of toy guns and other weaponry are representative of what she considers to be “a broad ensemble performance in which play and danger are a short distance apart.”

Lieberman's series of glass guns (from 2010 and 2017) is reminiscent of the toy pistols and retrofuturist space guns of mid century and the science fiction films of the 1980s. These elaborate and intricate glass sculptures counterpose objects of play and whimsy to weapons of violence and thereby suggest a dichotomy between the innocence of childhood and the overarching threat of violence in childhood environments. Regarding the symbolism behind her glass guns, Lieberman states that “a toy gun is an icon that embodies the conflict between reality and fantasy in the mind of a child, and in American culture in general.”

This contentious relationship between play and violence was further explored in Lieberman's solo shows UDBO PLAYGROUND (2017), at the Massey Lyuben Gallery in New York City, and FUNNY BALL (2022), at Muhlenberg College's Martin Art Gallery. Both exhibitions presented ensembles of hand-carved, polished, black marble sculptures and related prints. The sculptures resemble abstracted depictions of iconic objects associated with both play and conflict, such as flowers and baby rattles, as well as a “butterfly machine gun” and a “bunny bomb”. UBDO PLAYGROUND—“Unidentified Beautiful Dangerous Objects”—presented these sculptures in a grid format inspired by gameplay.

== Notable artworks ==
Holocaust Memorial (1983) Lieberman's Holocaust Memorial is a permanent installation on the grounds of the Jewish Museum Milwaukee. The memorial is enclosed by semi-circular granite seating. The entrance to the memorial features twenty-two trapezoid shaped steel panels, each with raised text spelling out the name of an infamous concentration camp, such that the passing viewer undergoes a kinetic experience, as if pages of a book are being turned. At the center of the installation is a large column inset with a yellow marble band that alludes to concentration camp crematoriums. According to art critic Robin Cembalest, the installation stands out from prior Holocaust memorials, and the “monument’s array of literal and symbolic citations would put R. B. Kitaj to shame.”

Jungle Gym for Johnny Joe (1991) Jungle Gym for Johnny Joe is a life-size facsimile of a jungle gym, commissioned for a public park at Snug Harbor Cultural Center in New York City. A memorial sculpture in the configuration of a play object, Jungle Gym for Johnny Joe is made of unrefined, textured steel rods set in a ten-foot high grid. Moreover, the sculpture serves as a support structure for a series of black stone sculptures. The project recounts the experience of a childhood neighbor of Lieberman's, a Vietnam veteran who returned home but did not survive the aftershocks of war. The delicate skeletal framework of the sculpture, set in a soft grassy field, suggests decay and renewal, and the work as a whole considers violence and its subsequent impact long after events have concluded.

Riversponge (1996) For Riversponge, Lieberman created a set of ten perforated alabaster balls, resembling buoys, which were affixed to poles and erected in a tidal river in Providence, Rhode Island. The use of alabaster, a soft stone which will slowly erode in running water, engages ideas of time, corporeality, and ecological processes. In a feature in Sculpture magazine, critic Cynthia Nadelman wrote that “Riversponge made us think about the site-specificity of eons of historical sculpture, as well as works of more recent vintage—to say nothing about the natural incursions visited upon outdoor art and her structures.”

Jell-O installations In the late 1990s, Lieberman began incorporating Jell-O into her installations, combining forms and structures made of industrial gelatin with black marble, video, alabaster, and rubber. The combination and seeming incongruity of these materials reflect ideas of permanence versus disintegration, as well as the variations in evolution of different materials and physical objects.

In an interview with María Carolina Baulo in Sculpture magazine, Lieberman expounds upon the symbolic and thematic import behind this juxtaposition of materials. “Jell-O is the perfect counterpoint to stone,” she states. “Though pretty, as a substance it’s completely unreliable. Its momentary sparkle is sure to collapse and wither away. Stone projects an eternal quality, a permanence, while Jell-O is ephemeral—the stuff of commerce, not nature”

Lieberman's use of Jell-O also makes reference to early childhood play and inquiry. An early installation, Walking thru Jell-O (1999), at the Anderson Gallery, Virginia Commonwealth University, featured a combination of alabaster forms simulating water balloons, three TVs with two videos, clamp lights, spread across the gallery floor. The videos depict a foot disrupting sculptural Jell-O formations that repeat the shape of the water balloons. Later installations such as Lifesavers (2002) and Poppies (2003) use cast Jell-O, juxtaposed with other marble components and shaped like candy or flowers. This pairing of materials that physically contrast the imagery they represent and highlight cultural and developmental dichotomies that begin during childhood.

Lieberman's large-scale installation, POPPIES (2008), exhibited at The LAB NYC, incorporated Jell-O, black marble, and video to provoke a sensory experience of touch, vision, and smell. Orange-red Jell-O forms resembling marguerite flowers, with pistils of highly polished black marble covered the gallery floor, while videos of an infinite field of Jell-O poppies were projected on the walls.

== Awards and recognition ==
Lieberman has received distinguished awards, fellowships, and residencies including the National Endowment for the Arts (1999), Seaside Institute (2007), The Arctic Circle (2013), the Cité Internationale des Arts in Paris (2013), MacDowell (2022), and Yaddo (2023).

Lieberman has been featured several times in Sculpture magazine, including a lengthy interview about the process, materials, and themes of her sculptural work. Her works have also been featured in The New York Times, Whitehot magazine, ARTnews, The Brooklyn Rail, Art on Paper, and GLASS Quarterly. Her Jell-O and marble sculptures are mentioned in Timothy Newark's book Camouflage (Imperial War Museum of London, 2007), which examines the use of camouflage in nature and culture. Contemporary art curator Suzanne Ramljak discusses Lieberman's glass guns in Loaded: Guns in Contemporary Art (Schiffer Publishing, 2022).

Lieberman was a visiting artist at the American Academy in Rome during the summer of 2023.

== Teaching and academic accomplishments ==
Lieberman is a professor of sculpture and expanded media at Illinois State University, where she received the Outstanding University Creativity Award. The award recognizes the “national/international reputation” and “consistent and sustained contributions” in the recipient's creative field.
