= New Mexico Holocaust & Intolerance Museum =

Coordinates: 35°5′0″N 106°39′0″W

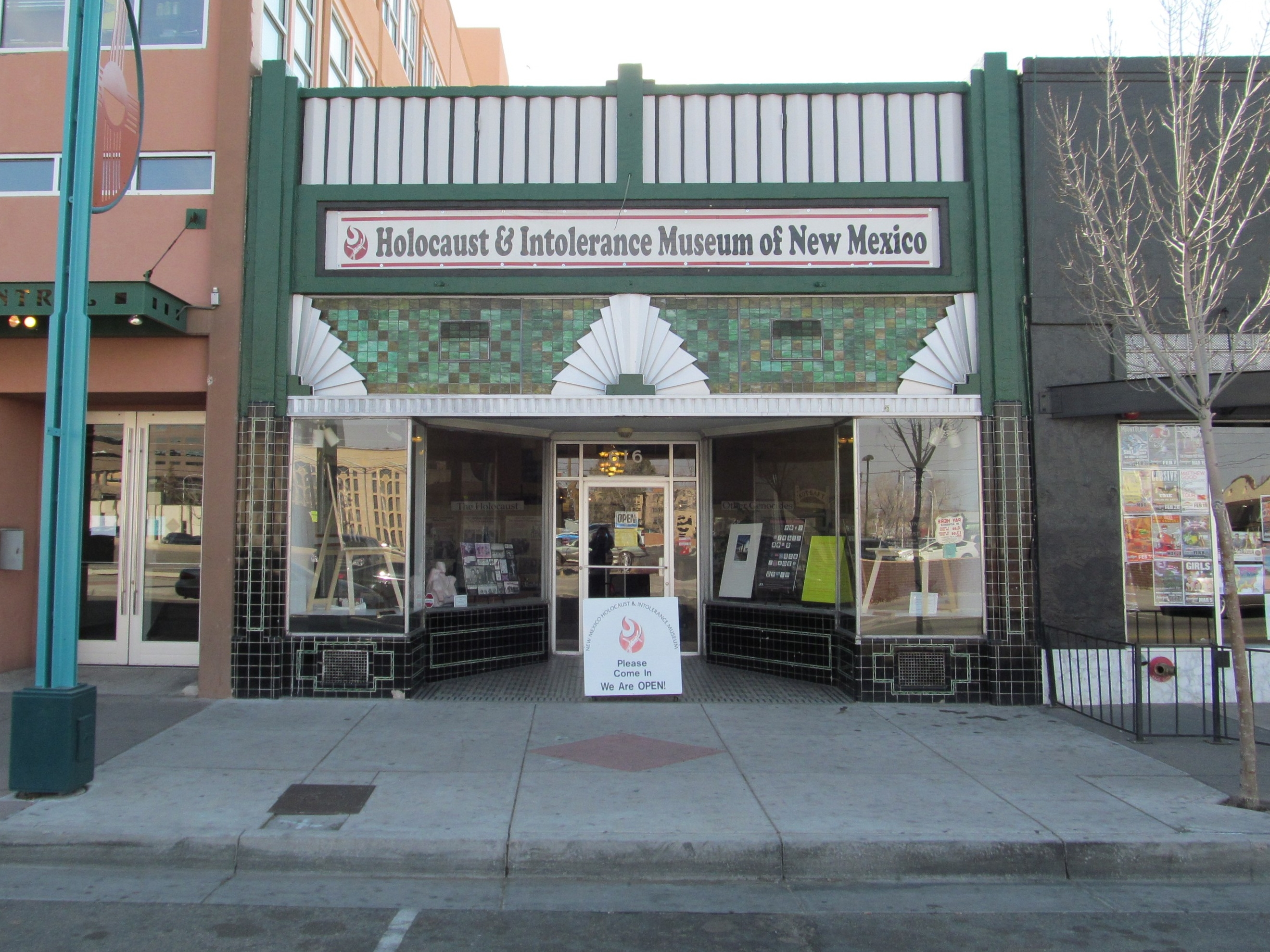
New Mexico Holocaust and Intolerance Museum

The New Mexico Holocaust & Intolerance Museum is a Holocaust museum in Albuquerque, New Mexico.

== History ==
The museum was founded in 2001 by Holocaust survivor Werner Gellert and his wife, Frances Gellert, to educate people about the Holocaust as well as other genocides and forms of bullying that have affected people around the world.

In addition to visits by the general public, the museum provides tours for schoolchildren, and offers training for teachers and school administrators about intolerance and hate prevention, and hosts monthly discussion groups.

Due to the sensitive and graphic nature of the exhibits, it has been recommended not to bring children under the age of 11.

In 2008, the museum was featured in the pilot episode of the TV show Breaking Bad, where it served as a clothing store. During that scene, Walter White attacks a group of bullies who are teasing his disabled son.

In July 2020, the window of the museum was smashed.

== Exhibits ==
Holocaust exhibits:

- Art of the Holocaust
- The liberation of Buchenwald
- Saving Bulgarian Jews
- Child slave labor
- The survivors of Dachau
- The rescue of the Danish Jews
- Flossenbürg slave labor
- Replica concentration camp gate
- Medical Experimentation in Nazi Germany
- Nazi memorabilia
- The Nuremberg Trials
- Photographs of rescued prisoners
- Rescuer's exhibit
- Sonia's legacy (the art of Sonja Fischerova, killed at Auschwitz on May 18, 1944)
- Holocaust stamps

Other exhibits:

- Media coverage of hate and intolerance
- Armenian genocide
- Greek genocide
- Native American cultural genocide
- 'Tolerated' genocide in Rwanda

== External links ==
- Official website
