= American Memorial to Six Million Jews of Europe =

Holocaust memorial

- Warsaw Ghetto Memorial
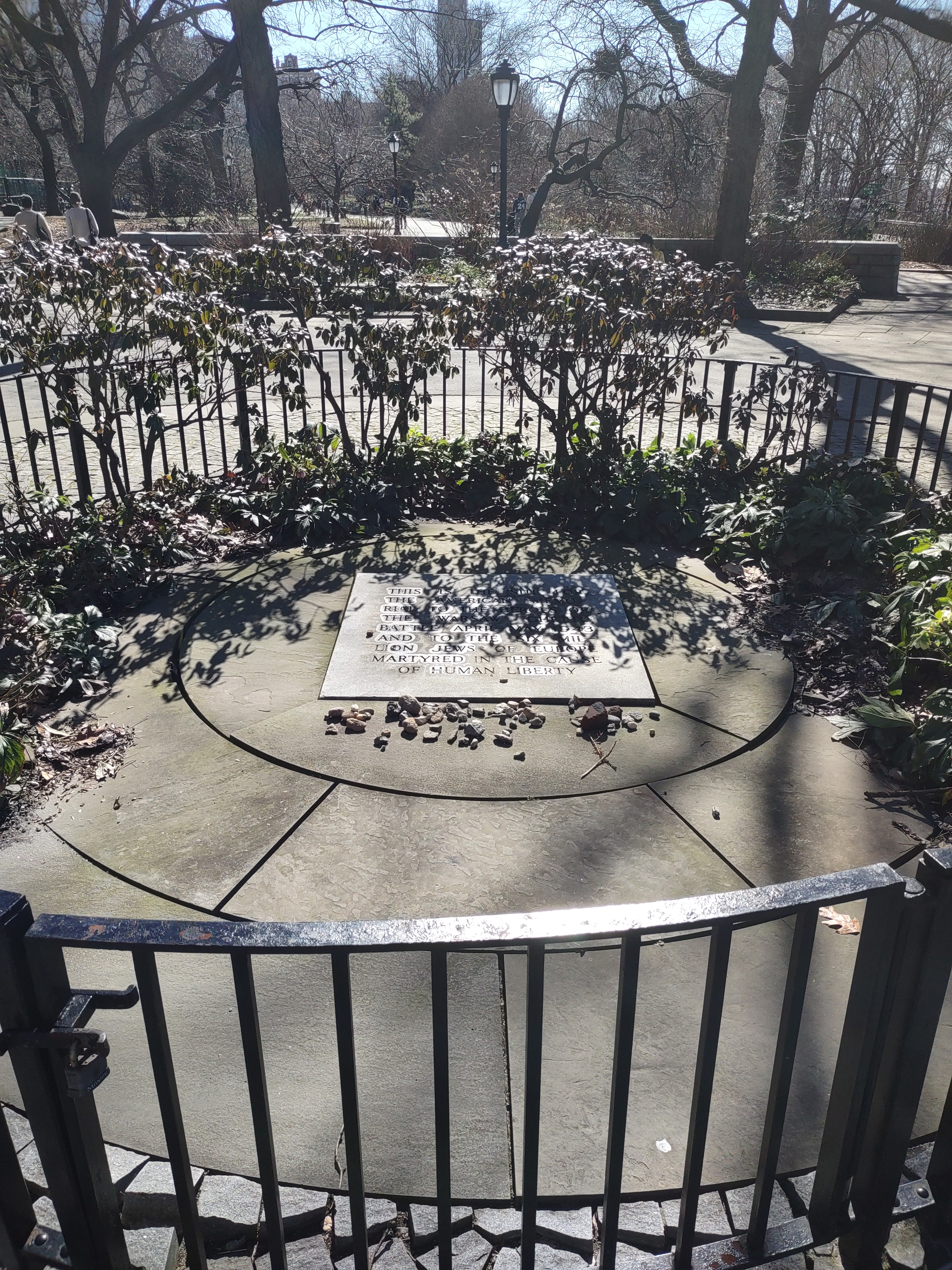
- Interactive map of American Memorial to Six Million Jews of Europe
- Location: Warsaw Ghetto Memorial Plaza, Riverside Park, Upper West Side, Manhattan, New York City
- Coordinates: 40.788177°N 73.982325°W
- Type: Public Holocaust memorial
- Material: White granite
- Dedicated date: October 19, 1947
- Dedicated to: The Warsaw Ghetto Uprising and the six million Jews murdered in the Holocaust
- Website: Official website

The American Memorial to Six Million Jews of Europe, also referred to as the Warsaw Ghetto Memorial, is a public Holocaust memorial situated at Warsaw Ghetto Memorial Plaza in Riverside Park, within the Upper West Side of Manhattan, New York City. It is a monument to the Warsaw Ghetto Uprising and the six million Jews who were murdered in the Holocaust. Dedicated on October 19, 1947, it is one of the first memorials to the Holocaust in the United States.

== History ==
A memorial to Six Million Jews of Europe was first proposed by Adolph R. Lerner, a Polish Jewish refugee who was a journalist and publisher. He had fled Vienna when the Nazis took over Austria in 1938, going first to France and then to the United States. During 1943 and 1944, he worked at the official Polish news agency in New York, editing bulletins that arrived from the Polish underground. Lerner was vice president of the "U.S. national organization of Polish Jews".

In January 1946 they proposed that an eternal flame be established dedicated to the heroes of the Warsaw ghetto and the six million Jews killed by the Nazis to be the "American Memorial to Six Million Jews of Europe".

Lerner won the support for the idea – but not the particular Design – from the parks commissioner Robert Moses. On May 2, 1947, Lerner received a letter from Moses stating this site had his approval.

On April 27, 1947, "Eternal Light Monument in the City of New York in Memory of Six Million Jews of Europe" was incorporated by Lerner. On May 20, 1947, the name of the organization was changed to "The American Memorial to Six Million Jews of Europe, Inc." Lerner was re-elected president. Then-Mayor William O'Dwyer, the 100th Mayor of New York City, was the Honorary Chairman of the National Committee of Sponsors, and Moses was a member ex-officio.

A wealthy acquaintance of Lerner's named Israel Rogosin joined the group, pledged $1000 (equivalent to $14,100 in 2024), and promised to get most of the rest of the necessary $6000 from friends.

On October 19, 1947, a granite plaque was placed in Riverside Park near 84th street to serve as a cornerstone for the planned monument. The cornerstone was placed by then-Mayor O'Dwyer. A crowd of 15,000 attended, including 100 survivors of the Buchenwald and Dachau concentration camps. The ceremony received extensive coverage in the press—local, national, and international—and it won the hearty endorsements of Jewish and non-Jewish notables.

In 1948 Israel Rogosin was appointed chairman of the $600,000 fundraising campaign of the American Memorial to Six Million Jews of Europe Inc. to build the monument.

Over several decades at least six different proposals were developed. Including an eternal flame, an assemblage of heroic figures, a sixty-foot stone pylon topped by a bronze menorah, and eighty-foot tablets inscribed with the Ten Commandments. Sculpture proposals for this location were submitted by Jo Davidson in 1948, by Percival Goodman in 1949, in 1951 by Erich Mendelsohn and Ivan Meštrović, and in 1964 by Nathan Rapoport, among others, but were all subsequently rejected as too ugly, too depressing or too distracting for drivers on the West Side Highway and none received funding. The effort was abandoned in 1964.

A monument measuring 102 by 60 feet (31 by 18 m) with a height of 80 feet (24 m), to be sculpted by Meštrović, was approved in 1952 but was never built. The Government of Yugoslavia has offered as a gift the granite needed to build a monument. The sculpture was to be of an eighty-foot pylon of two tablets on which the Ten Commandments would be inscribed, a 100-foot wall of bas-relief depicting humankind's struggle to fulfill the Commandments, and a giant carving of Moses. When Mendelsohn died in 1953, the momentum seemed to die with him. Over the years, the plaque itself has become the monument.

== Design ==
The memorial is a square white granite plaque situated in the center of the 12,000-square-foot (1,100 m^{2}) landscaped plaza surrounded by a metal fence 14 feet (4.3 m) in diameter. It is inscribed with the words:

This is the site for the American memorial to the heroes of the Warsaw Ghetto Battle April–May 1943 and to the six million Jews of Europe martyred in the cause of human liberty.

Beneath the plaque are Buried two boxes containing soil from the Theresienstadt Ghetto and Sereď concentration camp, two concentration camps in Czechoslovakia. Also buried is a scroll describing the defense of the Warsaw Ghetto, written in Hebrew by the Chief Rabbi of Jerusalem Rabbi Yitzhak HaLevi Herzog, and translated into English by Rabbi David de Sola Pool. It reads:

This monument set up in New York in the name of the people of the United States of America stands as a memorial of the unparalleled horror committed by the fiendish inhumanity of the Nazi leaders of the German people during the years 1939 to 1945 in destroying six million Jews, one-third of the whole Jewish people.

In 2001, the plaza was restored and improved through a partnership between the Riverside Park Conservancy and the City of New York, part of a requirements contract funded by Mayor Rudy Giuliani. Major support was provided by the Deedy and David Goldstick Foundation, and from the International Masonry Institute of the Union of Bricklayers and Allied Craftsmen. Architect Gail E. Wittwer-Laird designed the restoration. It is now called the Warsaw Ghetto Memorial Plaza. The wall surrounding the plaza was restored, new benches and lighting were installed. Bluestone and granite sets form the surface, with bluestone curbing outlining expanded gardens. The plaza was rededicated on October 19, 2001.

== Annual ceremony ==
Every April 19th, on the anniversary of the Warsaw Ghetto Uprising, the Congress for Jewish Culture, Friends of the Bund, the Jewish Labor Committee, and the Workers Circle organize a memorial ceremony honoring all of the Jews who fought, all who died, and all who survived. The event is held at the plaque, known colloquially in Yiddish as “der shteyn.”

== Caretaker ==
Since 1991 David T. Goldstick, a former real estate attorney and Upper West Side resident, began caring for the neglected planting in the area, restoring and beautifying the gardens surrounding the memorial. He also designed and planted the perimeter gardens. Goldstick was as attorney an advocate for tenants' rights and civil liberties, and as a young man traveled to Mississippi in 1963 to try civil rights cases during the voter registration drive. After retirement, he started volunteering as a gardener for the Park and has done so ever since.

On June 5, 2018, at the spring benefit for the Riverside Park Conservancy, Goldstick was honored with the "Robert M. Morgenthau Citizenship Award" for his work at the memorial. The Robert M. Morgenthau Citizenship Award was created by the Riverside Park Conservancy In 2016. It is granted each year to an honoree chosen for their service to the Park and the community.
