= Holocaust Memorial (Lieberman) =

Artwork by Claire Lieberman

- Artist: Claire Lieberman
- Year: 1983
- Dimensions: 300 cm × 730 cm × 610 cm (120 in × 288 in × 240 in)
- Location: Jewish Museum Milwaukee, Milwaukee; 43°02′52.48″N 87°53′42.35″W
- Owner: Jewish Museum Milwaukee

Holocaust Memorial is a public artwork by American artist Claire Lieberman located on the Jewish Museum Milwaukee lawn, which is near downtown Milwaukee, Wisconsin, United States. It is located at 1360 North Prospect Ave. This piece is 10 ft x 24 ft x 20 ft. The materials used are Corten steel, black granite, and brick. The Holocaust Memorial was created in 1983.

== Description ==
Holocaust Memorial is a sculpture that conveys a circular space, which is 10 ft x 24 ft x 20 ft. The ground is laid brick that is almost enclosed by granite seating which forms the circle. At the entrance there are 22 trapezoid panels of steel, eleven on each side. Each trapezoid has a name of a concentration camp in steel that can be seen from inside the circle. On the opposite side of the entrance there is a Granite Pillar with a yellow band. The sculpture also has an inscription which reads "IN MEMORY OF THE SIX MILLION JEWISH MARTYRS WHO PERISHED IN THE HOLOCAUST AND IN RECOGNITION OF THE COURAGE AND SPIRIT OF THE SURVIVORS"

== Historic Information ==
"Visitors enter the enclosed Memorial through steel sheets that evoke the pages of a book. Each one is marked with the name of a concentration camp. Over the years, the metal has aged, making the sheets look tear-stained. As one goes into the memorial, railroad ties recall the trains which transported Jews to concentration camps. A granite obelisk is at the center of the sculpture, to symbolize the chimneys used in crematoria. It is inscribed with the word Zakhor, 'remember." The Memorial is both open, yet protected, creating a space of its own. Community members, including immigrants who lost loved ones in the Holocaust, use the Holocaust Memorial as a place to remember.

== Location History ==
'Holocaust Memorial' is located at the Jewish Museum Milwaukee funded by the Milwaukee Jewish Federation.

== Artist ==
Claire Lieberman grew up in Milwaukee, Wisconsin. She attended Whitefish Bay High School as well as the Milwaukee Independent School. She studied art at the Boston Museum School, graduating in 1976. Lieberman then moved to Carrara, Italy to study how to be a stonecutter. She worked in New York City from 1985 until 1993, and then joined the faculty of the University of Chicago. "Ms. Lieberman's work is abstract, yet figurative in intent. Her sculpture has interesting contrasts in forms and texture. She regularly exhibits in major galleries and her work is reviewed in major art periodicals."
