= Holocaust Documentation & Education Center =

Coordinates: 26.0579°N 80.1443°W

The Holocaust Documentation & Education Center, located at 303 North Federal Highway, Dania Beach, Florida, was founded in 1980. The center is raising funds to build the first South Florida Holocaust museum, which will – uniquely for a museum of this type – serve both the Spanish- and the English-speaking public. After vacating its previous location, a three-story building at 2031 Harrison Street in Hollywood, Florida, it moved into its current location, a 25,000-square-foot (2,300 m^{2}) facility, on September 28, 2016.

== Oral history ==
The center has conducted, for its oral history collection, more than 2,500 interviews with Holocaust witnesses, and continues to conduct interviews. The interviews, recorded on video, are transcribed verbatim onto acid-free paper; the center claims on its website that this is the only known collection with transcripts of each interview. As of 2017, the center is in the process of digitizing and indexing the interviews.

== Projected museum ==
The architectural work for the museum has been completed and fundraising is underway. The $10 million museum is being built in stages, as funding comes in, according to its 2017 president, Rositta Kenigsberg. The goal is to complete it by 2020.

When completed, the museum will contain the following exhibits, according to its website:

- Life before the Holocaust
- Precursors/antecedents to the Holocaust
- Rise of the Nazi Party (St. Louis, persecution, Nuremberg Laws)
- Ghettos (Warsaw, Lodz, etc.)
- Final Solution (concentration and extermination camps), including the restored rail car
- Resistance: Courageous Acts in Desperate Times
- Rescuers (individuals and countries)
- Liberation (life reborn, Displaced Persons camps, aftermath, pursuit of justice)
- Reflection, Remembrance, and Responsibility
- Traveling gallery, first exhibit (non-permanent): 1936 Berlin Olympics

== Key pieces ==
The museum has the following key pieces:

- An authenticated and restored rail car used to transport Holocaust victims, from Poland.
- A U.S. Army M-4A 3E8 Sherman tank, used to liberate the Dachau Concentration Camp in Germany, on permanent loan from the U.S. Army

Even though the museum is not yet open, it offers tours of the 30-ton tank and rail car by appointment.

== Outreach and education ==
The center has an active speakers program and regularly puts on Student Awareness Day programs.

== Legislation ==
A key accomplishment of the center is having authored and lobbied successfully for Florida statute 1003.42(g), signed by Governor Lawton Chiles, which mandates instruction of the history of the Holocaust in Florida schools. In Miami-Dade, Broward, and Palm Beach counties, the center sponsors Student Awareness Days, which it describes as "prejudice reduction symposia".

== Library ==
The center's reference and research library contains more than 6,000 volumes of Holocaust-related books, journals, DVDs, and videos.
