= NKVD prisoner massacres in Lviv =

Mass murder of prisoners in Lviv prisons

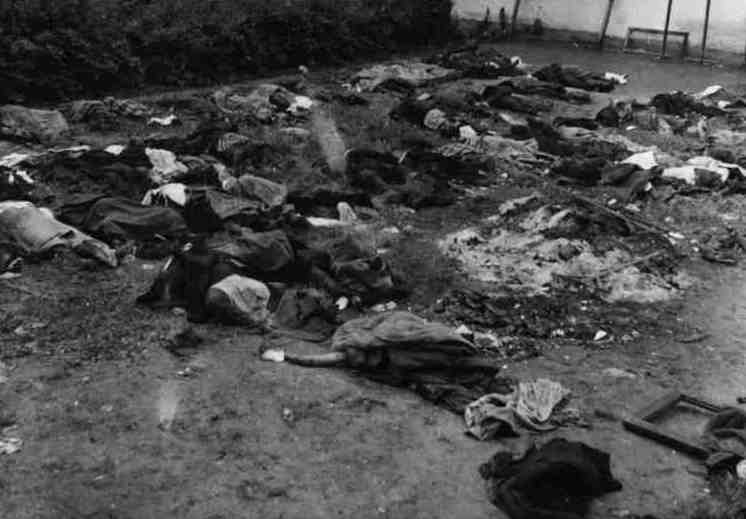
- Corpses of the victims in the courtyard of the prison on Łącki Street
- Location: 49°50′31.20″N 24°01′55.19″E; Lviv, Poland (under the Soviet occupation)
- Date: June 1941
- Attack type: execution by firing squad
- Victims: 3,500–7,000
- Perpetrator: NKVD

The NKVD prison massacres in Lviv were a mass murder of prisoners held in Lviv prisons and detention centers, carried out by Soviet NKVD and NKGB officers in the last days of June 1941.

Following the German invasion of the Soviet Union, People's Commissar of Internal Affairs Lavrentiy Beria issued an order to execute all political prisoners held in the western regions of the Soviet Union who could not be evacuated further into the country. In line with this order, Soviet security officers murdered between 3,500 and 7,000 people in Lviv's prisons – Brygidki, the prison on Łącki Street, the prison in Zamarstyniv, and their branches. Among the victims were Ukrainians, Poles, and Jews, including some women and minors. This was the largest and most notorious crime committed during the so-called NKVD prisoner massacres in the summer of 1941.

After Wehrmacht units entered Lviv, the local population, inspired by the Germans, organized a several-day pogrom against the Jewish population, who, according to the Żydokomuna stereotype, were identified with the Soviet regime and its crimes. The massacre in Lviv's prisons was also widely publicized by Nazi propaganda and served the Germans as a pretext for carrying out mass executions of Jews.

== Lviv in the first days of the German-Soviet war ==
On 22 June 1941, Nazi Germany invaded the Soviet Union. The initial weeks of the war were very favorable for the Germans. Wehrmacht divisions managed to break the forces of the Soviet border military districts and penetrate deep into Soviet territory. Among the successes was the German advance in Volhynia and Eastern Galicia, where the largest and best-equipped grouping of the Red Army, the Southwestern Front, was defending. In the first twenty days of the war, its units suffered enormous losses in men and equipment and were forced to retreat nearly 250 km east of the German-Soviet border.

Lviv, under Soviet occupation since September 1939, was located about 80 km from the border. On the first day of the war, its downtown was bombed twice by the German Luftwaffe. The raids resulted in numerous human casualties but relatively minor material damage. Although the city was on the peripheral direction of the German offensive, panic quickly gripped the local occupation authorities and the incoming Soviet population. On the night of June 22 to 23, the "easterners" (Note: The term was used to describe Soviet citizens who settled in the occupied Kresy after the Soviet invasion of Poland.) began a mass flight eastward, leaving behind empty offices, party premises, and police stations. The first to hastily "evacuate" were NKVD officers, militsiya, and prison guards. It wasn't until June 24, under explicit orders from higher authorities, that some of the occupation apparatus staff briefly returned to Lviv.

On June 24, an armed diversion organized by the Organisation of Ukrainian Nationalists occurred in Lviv. In various parts of the city, the organisation's militsiya fired on columns of Soviet troops and hunted down individual Red Army soldiers and occupation personnel. At the prison on Łącki Street, Ukrainian nationalists managed to free 270 inmates. (Note: This number was reported in a document dated 28 June 1941 by Captain Andrei Filippov, head of the Ukrainian SSR NKVD prison administration (Mazur, Skwara & Węgierski (2007, p. 190)).) They also disrupted the march of the 4th Mechanized Corps and the 8th Mechanized Corps through the streets of Lviv and carried out unsuccessful attacks on the NKVD headquarters on Pełczyńska Street and the prison in Zamarstyniv. In response, the Soviets brutally suppressed the rebellion, executing people caught with weapons on the spot and opening fire from rifles and tank guns on all windows and attics from which shots were reportedly fired. They even fired at the towers of the Church of St. Mary Magdalene and the Cathedral Basilica of the Assumption. The chaotic and brutal pacification resulted in the deaths of both insurgents and innocent civilians. Up to 4,000 people – mainly Ukrainians, but also some Poles – were arrested and imprisoned in Lviv's prisons and detention centers.

On June 25, the garrison commander of Lviv declared martial law in the city. By this time, the Ukrainian insurgency was largely subdued, although some sources indicate that the Organisation of Ukrainian Nationalists members continued sporadic attacks until June 28.

== Massacres in Lviv prisons ==
=== Prelude ===
During the Soviet occupation, there were three prisons operating in Lviv:

- The prison on Łącki Street (prison no. 1), which functioned as an internal prison for the NKGB;
- The prison in Zamarstyniv (prison no. 2), which before the war served as a military prison;
- The prison on Horodotska Street (prison no. 4), commonly known as Brygidki.

Arrestees by the Soviet security apparatus were also detained in the former court of appeals building on Batory Street, in court buildings on Sądowa Street, and in a building on Jachowicz Street, which pre-war housed a state police station. However, Soviet documents did not distinguish these places as separate facilities, implying that they were merely branches of the three aforementioned prisons.

Documents found in Soviet archives indicate that as of 10 June 1941, there were a total of 5,145 prisoners in Lviv prisons. However, it is certain that the number of prisoners was higher in the last days of June. After the outbreak of the German-Soviet war and the suppression of the Ukrainian diversion, hundreds of Lviv residents were arrested but not yet registered in the prison records.

Initially, according to pre-war plans, the NKVD intended to evacuate prisoners deep into the Soviet Union. On 23 June 1941, Deputy People's Commissar of Internal Affairs of the Soviet Union, Vasiliy Chernyshov, approved an evacuation plan for prisoners held in prisons in Western Ukraine, Western Belarus, and Lithuania. The plan stipulated that 1,000 prisoners from Lviv would be sent to prisons in the Soviet Bashkiria, 1,000 to prisons in the North Ossetian Autonomous Soviet Socialist Republic, 1,000 to prisons in the Arkhangelsk Oblast, 1,000 to prisons in the Ivanovo Oblast, and 591 to prisons in the Molotov Oblast. That same day, Captain of State Security, Andrei Filippov, head of the NKVD prison administration in the Ukrainian SSR, acting on orders from the People's Commissar of Internal Affairs of the Ukrainian SSR, Vasyl Serhiyenko, issued Colonel Zavyalov, commander of the 13th NKVD Convoy Troops Division, an evacuation plan for 23,400 prisoners held in Western Ukraine.

Reports from the 13th NKVD Convoy Troops Division reveal that only one transport with 527 prisoners managed to leave Lviv for the east on June 23. (Note: Additionally, on the first day of the war, a transport of prisoners, numbering between 500 and 1,000 people, departed eastward from Klepariv. However, this transport had been assembled the previous evening and most likely was not related to the evacuation prompted by the start of the German invasion. Despite the difficult travel conditions and the death of many prisoners, the transport managed to reach Berdychiv (Mikoda (1997, p. 124); Mazur, Skwara & Węgierski (2007, p. 180)).) Polish sources indicate that around 800 people were led out of one of the Lviv prisons, possibly the one on Jachowicz Street, and forced to march east. The prisoners had to walk through Tarnopol, Chortkiv, and Berdychiv, eventually reaching Moscow on August 28. Along the way, the guards killed those unable to keep up with the column. In Moscow, the prisoners were loaded onto trains and continued their evacuation by rail, arriving in Pervouralsk on 16 November 1941. Only 248 prisoners reached the destination, with many unable to leave the train carriages unaided and others dying from typhus soon after.

The evacuation of prisoners was accompanied by the evacuation of 12,000 Polish prisoners of war who were employed building railways between Lviv and Przemyśl, Lviv and Tarnopol, Lviv and Rivne, and the airfield in Skniłów. Most were forced to march east; (Note: Only soldiers working near Przemyśl managed to escape from the camp in the chaos of the first hours of the war and fanned out across the countryside. The prisoners of war from the other camps were rushed on foot eastward (Węgierski (1991, p. 269)).) on June 24, some were marched through Lviv. Along the way, those who could not keep up were killed by the guards. After reaching Volochysk, the Polish soldiers were loaded 100 to a freight car and sent to Starobilsk. During the journey, they received no water and only 150 grams of bread and a salty fish each. By 28 July 1941, all Polish prisoners of war reached their destination, with at least 1,800 perishing during the evacuation. For instance, more than 200 prisoners of war from a 2,000-strong column from Skniłów were murdered.

The lack of sufficient railway cars, the chaos of the early days of the war, and the rapid German advance quickly rendered the plans to evacuate Lviv's prisons unfeasible. Nonetheless, Soviet authorities were determined not to allow the "enemies of the people" to be freed by the Germans. On June 24, People's Commissar of Internal Affairs, Lavrentiy Beria, ordered NKGB regional offices to execute all political prisoners held in the western regions of the Soviet Union who could not be evacuated. According to Beria's order, those convicted of "counter-revolutionary activities", "anti-Soviet activities", sabotage, and diversion, as well as political prisoners under investigation, were to be executed.

=== Course of the extermination action ===
In Lviv, the first murders of prisoners occurred on June 22. Hastily, among others, 108 prisoners sentenced to death were executed. The next day, the liquidation of prisoners held in the NKGB internal prison on Łącki Street began. Executions carried out in the early days of the war claimed hundreds of lives but did not take on an organized character. Chaos and panic that engulfed the Soviet occupation apparatus also affected the prison services. Officials and guards fled the city, leaving prisoners locked in the prisons. Additionally, the 233rd NKVD Convoy Troops Regiment, whose task included securing Lviv's prisons, was paralyzed between 23 and 24 June by a series of contradictory orders that included both evacuating from Lviv and remaining in the city.

The situation changed dramatically on June 25, when mass and systematic liquidation of inmates began in all Lviv prisons. Bogdan Musiał and Alexander Guryanov linked the commencement of the extermination action to the arrival in the city of the deputies of the People's Commissars for Internal Affairs and State Security of the Ukrainian SSR. (Note: It has not been possible to determine which deputy People's Commissars came to Lviv, or how many there were (Musiał (2001, p. 96)).) Musiał suspected that they had been tasked with ensuring the execution of Beria's order to shoot "counter-revolutionary elements". He pointed out, in this context, to an NKVD report from June 26, which indicated that with the arrival of the commissars, the plan to evacuate prisoners into the interior of the Soviet Union was ultimately abandoned in favor of releasing criminal prisoners and transporting up to 200 so-called pieriebieżcziks (Note: The term was used to refer to people who found themselves on the territory of the Soviet Union after illegally crossing the border (Popiński, Kokurin & Gurjanow (1995, p. 96)).) to the east. The report did not specify the fate of the remaining prisoners, but the events of the following days indicate that their liquidation was ordered.

Massacres in Lviv's prisons usually followed a similar pattern. NKVD and NKGB officers called prisoners from their cells, then individually or in small groups led them to the prison basements and killed them there. Individual and mass executions also took place in the prison yards. In the final hours before the German troops entered the city, NKVD officers killed prisoners directly in their cells, opening fire through the bars or throwing grenades into the overcrowded rooms. The bodies were buried in graves dug on the prison grounds or left in cells and basements (some of which were bricked up). Sometimes the victims were buried outside the prisons, for example, in Bodnar Park. Executions were carried out with car engines running to drown out the sounds of gunfire and the screams of the murdered. At the same time, the surrounding streets were cordoned off by Soviet militsiya, preventing outsiders from accessing the prison buildings. The extermination of prisoners continued until the Soviet troops left Lviv.

==== Brygidki ====
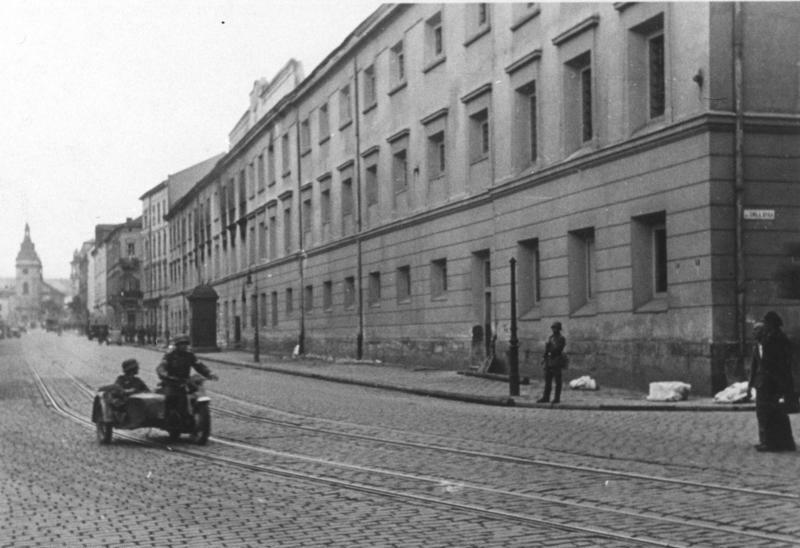
Brygidki prison. Photo taken in early July 1941

In the Brygidki prison, there were likely about 4,000 prisoners. According to Dieter Schenk, the first executions were carried out there as early as June 22. However, on the evening of June 23, the Soviet guards left the building, bolting the gates and leaving the prisoners in locked cells. The next morning, the prisoners realized the situation and, after breaking down the cell doors, made their way to the prison courtyard. However, only about 220–362 people, mainly common criminals according to NKVD reports, managed to escape the prison grounds – through a gate forced open from the outside and through the roof. The remaining prisoners either could not breach the gates or did not dare to leave the building. Meanwhile, at around 4:00 AM on June 25, NKVD officers returned to Brygidki. With machine-gun fire, they forced the prisoners back into their cells, killing at least thirteen and wounding six others in the process. The cells were locked again, and the prisoners were ordered to lie face down on the floor.

Zygmunt Cybulski recalled that after returning to Brygidki, the NKVD officers handed out slips of paper to the prisoners, instructing them to write their name, father's name, date of birth, date of arrest, and the article under which they were charged or convicted. Criminal prisoners were then successively released. Most political prisoners, however, faced death. Cybulski reported that victims were called out from their cells in groups of 20–40 and then shot in the prison yard. In other wings of the building, prisoners were taken out of their cells individually or in small groups, led to the basements, and murdered there. Executions were also said to have been carried out directly in the cells. The sounds of gunfire and the screams of the victims were drowned out by running car engines. The massacre at Brygidki continued until Saturday, June 28, and in its final phase, the building was set on fire. The NKVD likely started the fire to cover up the evidence of their crimes. However, some sources suggest that the surviving prisoners set the fire themselves after the Soviets left, to prevent the prison records from falling into the hands of the approaching Germans.

Eyewitnesses estimated that about 100 men and several dozen – relatively "a handful" – women survived the NKVD's massacre at Brygidki. Soviet reports indicate that 1,366 prisoners were left in the cells at the prison on Horodotska Street. Earlier, several hundred inmates had successfully escaped, and an unspecified number were released or evacuated to the east. Based on this, Bogdan Musiał estimated that at least half of the prisoners, over 2,000 people, were killed by NKVD officers. The piles of corpses found in the basements of Brygidki were stacked from 4 to 5 layers deep.

Among the prisoners who survived the massacre were some members of the Lviv scouting conspiracy, as well as three Union of Armed Struggle couriers from Warsaw. Also among the survivors was 74-year-old Professor Roman Rencki (a physician and lecturer at the University of Lviv), who, however, was shot by the Germans a few days later as part of their operation against Lviv professors.

==== Prison on Łącki Street ====
In the NKGB Internal Prison on Łącki Street, approximately a thousand prisoners were held. According to the authors of Chronicle of 2,350 Days of War and Occupation of Lviv, their liquidation began as early as June 23. However, the following day, the prison was attacked by the Organization of Ukrainian Nationalists militsiya, which managed to free 270 inmates. After suppressing the Ukrainian insurgency, the extermination of prisoners continued. On June 26, the commander of the 13th NKVD Convoy Troops Division, Colonel Zavyalov, reported to the People's Commissar of the NKVD of the Ukrainian SSR, Serhiyenko, that the prison on Łącki Street had already been "liquidated", and the division's units were directed to fight the insurgents and defend Lviv. In reality, the extermination action reached its peak intensity on June 27 and 28.

Prisoners from Łącki Street were shot in the basements and cells. Their bodies were either left at the execution sites or moved to mass graves dug in the prison yard. The Germans, who investigated the massacre site, estimated the number of those killed at roughly 4,000. According to Bogdan Musiał, however, the massacre claimed about a thousand victims. Only a few individuals survived, having managed to hide under piles of corpses. Among the few survivors were two Union of Armed Struggle radio operators assigned to Colonel Leopold Okulicki.

==== Prison in Zamarstyniv ====
In the former military prison in Zamarstyniv, about a thousand prisoners were held. In the early days of the war, the building was temporarily abandoned by the guards, but the inmates were unable to take advantage of this situation. Upon their return, the NKVD officers began a systematic extermination of the prisoners. They were taken out of their cells and shot in the prison yard. Some victims were also murdered inside the prison premises. The sounds of the executions were drowned out by running car engines.

When the Germans entered the city, they investigated the massacre site and estimated that approximately 3,000 people had been killed. Bogdan Musiał, however, assessed that the vast majority of the approximately thousand prisoners were killed. According to NKVD reports, 66 people were left alive in Zamarstyniv. Polish sources indicate that from 64 to 65 men and five women survived the massacre. One of the surviving women was Wanda Ossowska, a Union of Armed Struggle courier, who described these events in her post-war memoirs.

==== Prison at Jachowicza Street ====
At the prison on Jachowicza Street, the criminal prisoners were released. Political prisoners, however, were taken from their cells at five-minute intervals and then led to the basement, where they were shot in the back of the head. The bodies were moved to a mass grave dug in the courtyard, which was later covered with a thin layer of sand. The exact number of those murdered could not be determined. After the Soviets evacuated Lviv, no living person was found on the prison grounds.

==== Other locations ====
The fate of the prisoners held in the prison branches on Batory Street and Sądowa Street remains unknown. It is assumed that they were also murdered. Executions likely took place at the NKVD headquarters on Pełczyńska Street as well.

=== Number of victims ===
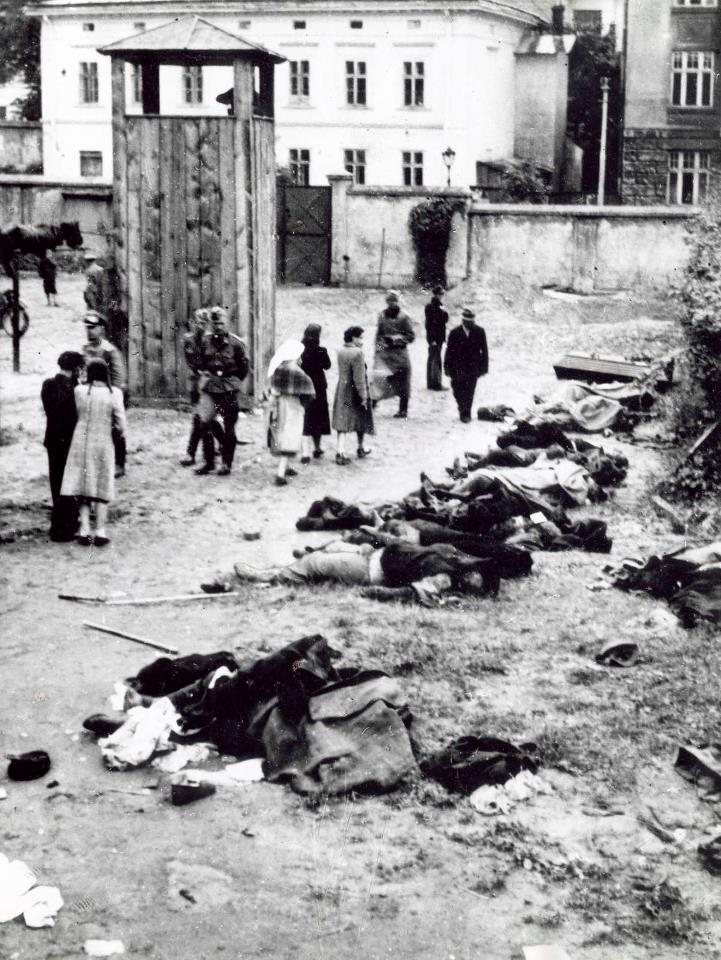
The corpses of the victims in the courtyard of the prison on Łącki Street

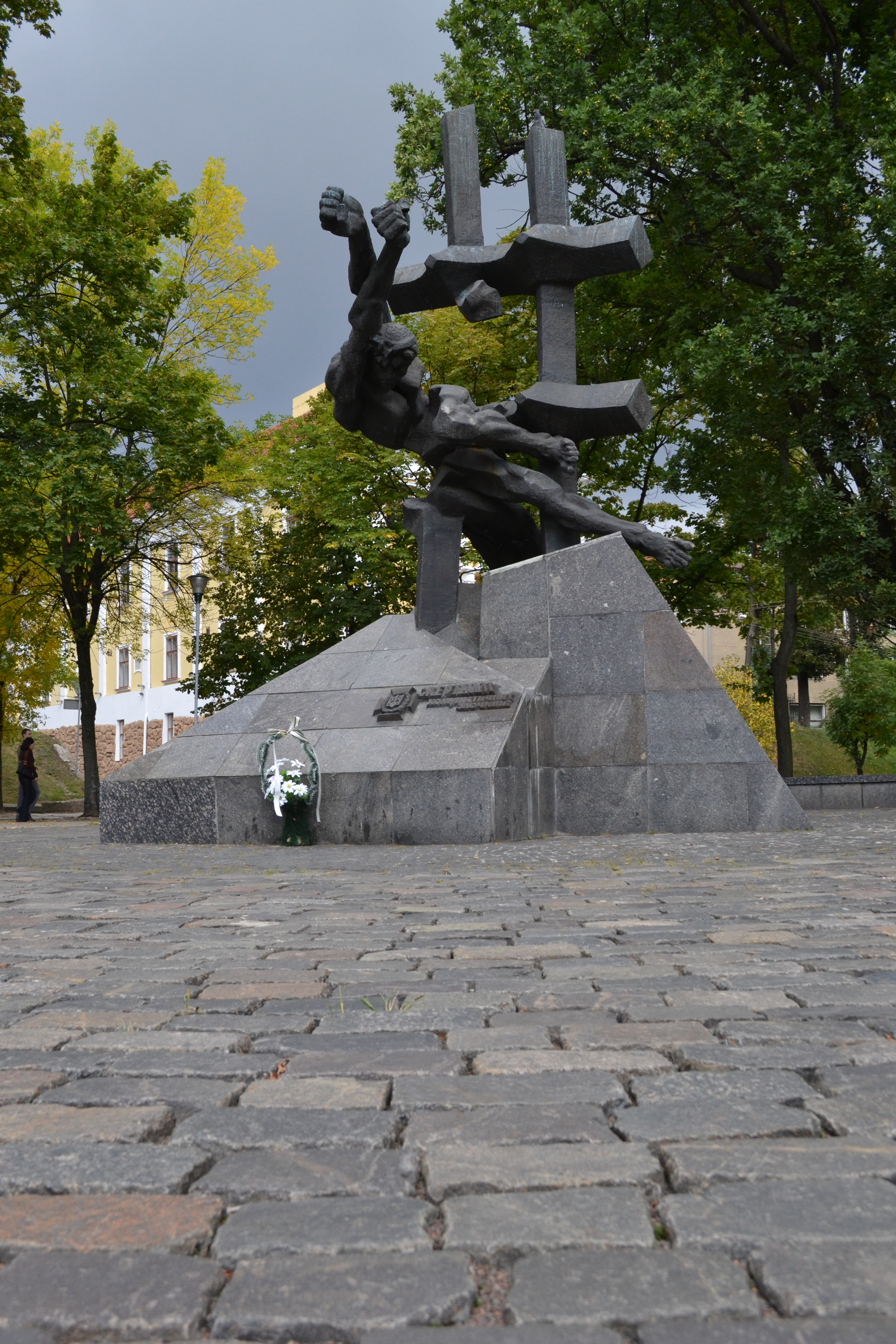
Monument on Shashkevich Square in Lviv, commemorating murdered prisoners

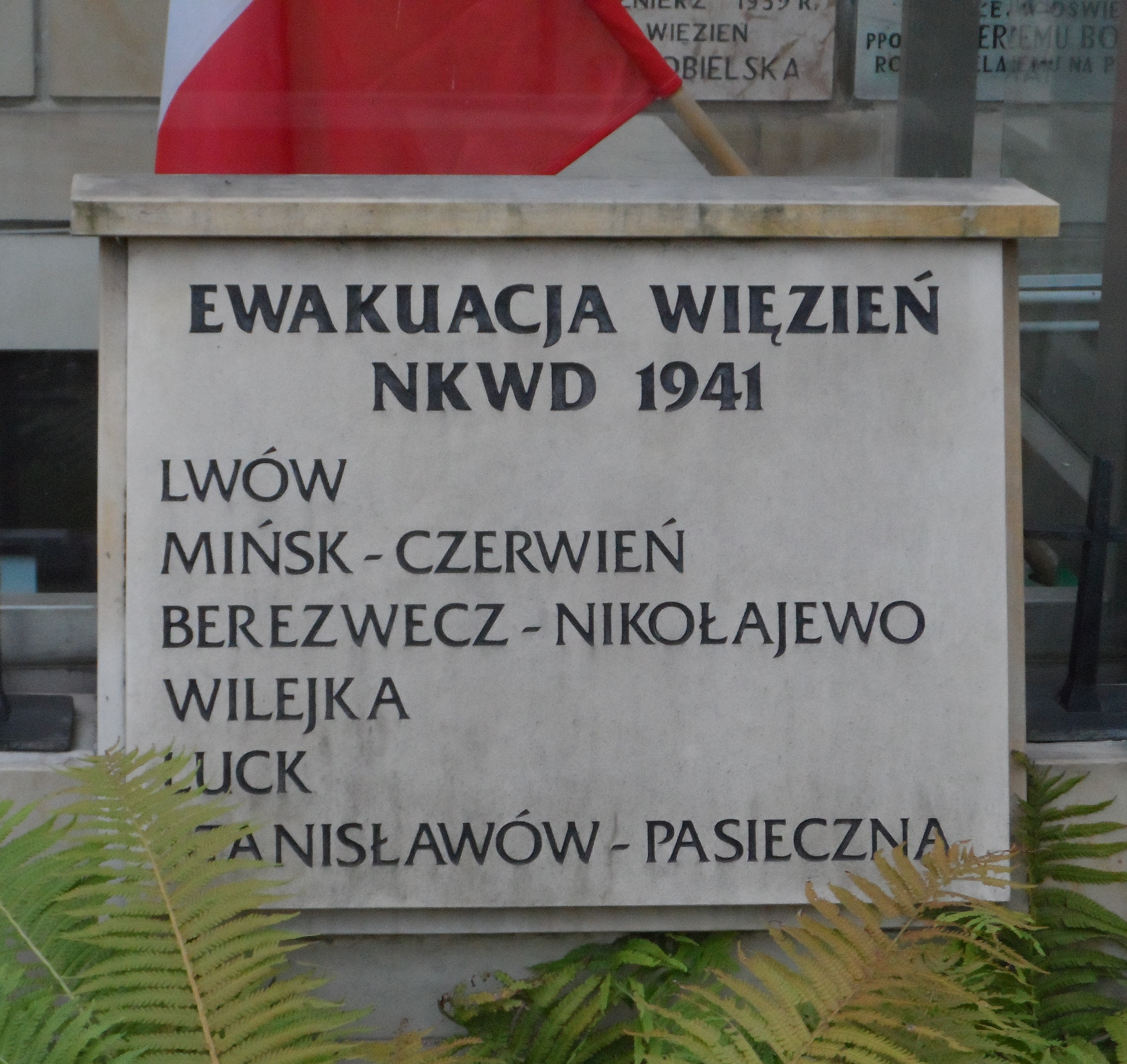
NKVD prisoner massacres commemorative plaque at St. Stanislaus Kostka Church in Warsaw

The mass executions in Lviv's prisons were the largest and most notorious crimes committed during the so-called NKVD prisoner massacres in the summer of 1941. The number of victims remains difficult to determine. According to a report by Andrei Filippov, head of the NKVD's prison administration in the Ukrainian SSR, a total of 2,464 prisoners were "reduced according to the first category" in the four prisons of the Lviv region (three in Lviv and one in Zolochiv). This source also reports that 808 prisoners were released, 201 were evacuated, and 1,546, mostly common criminals, were left in the cells (with about 300 escaping in Lviv on the night from 23 to 24 June). However, Bogdan Musiał questions the figures in the NKVD reports, noting that they are partial, suspiciously precise, and likely understated. The Germans, who investigated Soviet crimes after capturing Lviv, inflated the number of victims for propaganda purposes. While the Geheime Feldpolizei estimated 3,500 victims, Einsatzgruppen and Reich Security Main Office reports claimed 20,000 to 30,000 murdered.

Contemporary historians present varying estimates. Some suggest that the number of victims was between 3,000 and 3,500. Bogdan Musiał estimated that about 4,000 people were murdered in the three main prisons alone, a figure also supported by Krzysztof Popiński. Tadeusz Olszański and A. Rzepicki argued that about 5,000 prisoners were shot. Other researchers estimate the number of victims at 7,000. Most of the murdered were Ukrainians; the second-largest ethnic group among the victims were Poles. It is also likely that several hundred Jews were killed in Lviv's prisons. The majority of the victims were men, but there were also some women and minors. Additionally, the Soviets reportedly killed an unknown number of captured German soldiers in the prisons.

Among the Poles murdered during the liquidation of Lviv's prisons were Władysław Furgalski (judge of the Lviv Court of Appeal), Kazimiera Jagniewska (arrested for her involvement in the scouting movement), Juliusz Kolmer (military doctor, titular general of the Polish Armed Forces), Antoni Konopacki (lawyer, member of the National Council at Lviv's Union of Armed Struggle), Adam Kozakiewicz (architect), Lieutenant Colonel Adam Paszkowski (commander of the Lviv Union of Armed Struggle Area), Kazimierz Szumowski (laryngologist, docent at the University of Lviv), and members of the underground organization Wyzwolenie led by brothers Mieczysław and Jan Weiss.

Many prominent Ukrainian figures also fell victim to the NKVD, including Vasyl Bien (lieutenant colonel of the Ukrainian People's Republic army, director of the Shashkevych school), Mykola Konrad (Greek Catholic priest, professor at the Lviv Theological Academy), Orest Radlovsky (director of Centrosoyuz), Eustachy Struk (former director of the medical institute), Mykhailo Strutynsky (journalist, member of the Polish Sejm from 1928 to 1930), Kyrylo Studynsky (professor of literature), and Yuriy Shukhevych (brother of Roman Shukhevych). Among the murdered was also Michał Ringel, a Zionist activist and senator of the Polish Republic from 1922 to 1927.

A partial list of prisoners executed by the NKVD in the prisons on Łącki Street and in Zamarstyniv was found by members of the Memorial association in the archives of the Security Service of Ukraine. It was published in the book Roads of Death by the KARTA Center in 1995.

Witness accounts of the exhumations frequently mentioned that the discovered bodies bore signs of torture. Reports stated that some bodies had skulls crushed with axes or blunt objects, skin peeled from hands, fingers and genitals cut off, and signs of being burned alive. In Brygidki, the NKVD reportedly walled up prisoners alive in cells, condemning them to death by suffocation. There were also reports of female bodies with breasts cut off and signs of rape. Some accounts even claimed that bodies were found impaled on butcher hooks or nailed to walls with bayonets at the prison on Łącki Street. While some of the victims were indeed murdered with bayonets and blunt instruments, Bogdan Musiał believes that the injuries perceived as torture marks were often caused by the rapid decomposition of the bodies (accelerated by the summer heat), scavengers, and hasty exhumation. Additionally, during the final phase of the massacre, executions were carried out very hastily, using grenades and machine guns. It is also likely that some NKVD officers tortured their victims before killing them. However, Musiał suggests that after the Soviets left, some of the bodies were deliberately mutilated by Ukrainian nationalists to create dramatic examples of their nation's suffering for propaganda purposes.

In the summer of 1941, only part of the bodies from Lviv's prisons were exhumed and ceremoniously buried in mass graves at the Janowski Cemetery. Due to the rapid decomposition of the bodies, exacerbated by the heat, the military commandant of the city soon ordered a halt to the exhumations and the sealing of the cellars where the murdered were interred. It was not until the early months of 1942 that additional bodies were exhumed from the prisons in Zamarstyniv and on Jachowicza Street and buried in the municipal cemetery.

== Pogroms and massacres of Lviv's Jews ==
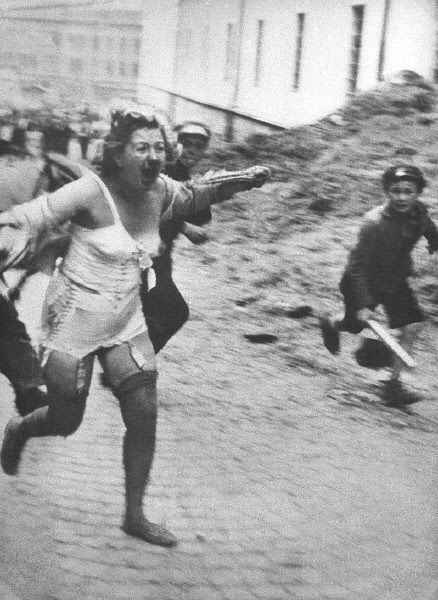
Jewish woman fleeing from the mob during a pogrom in Lviv

After the last units of the Red Army and NKVD left Lviv on the night from 28 to 29 June 1941, the German-Ukrainian Nachtigall Battalion was the first organized Wehrmacht unit to enter the city around 4:30 AM on June 30. Following the Soviet departure, hundreds of Lviv residents went to the prisons, where they found thousands of mutilated bodies and a few survivors. Among the piles of corpses, families tried to find their relatives, often in vain. Witnesses recalled that the stench of decomposing bodies was noticeable from hundreds of meters away.

The magnitude and brutality of the Soviet crime caused immense outrage among the residents, which resulted in violence against the Jewish population, who were widely associated with the Soviet regime and its policies of terror. While many Jews, especially those from higher social strata, fell victim to Soviet repression after 17 September 1939, (Note: According to Jan Tomasz Gross, people of Jewish nationality accounted for as much as 30% of the victims of the Soviet deportations between 1939 and 1941. However, this estimate is most likely overstated (Musiał (2001, p. 53)).) many others actively participated in the creation of the occupation order by collaborating with the Soviets as NKVD informants, joining the militsiya, or taking up lower positions in the administrative and economic apparatus. This led to the stereotype of Żydokomuna becoming entrenched across Kresy, exacerbating already strong pre-war antisemitic sentiments. In Lviv, the end of Soviet occupation and the shock caused by the prison massacres acted as a catalyst for a bloody multi-day pogrom.

The antisemitic riots were not spontaneous. Even before the invasion of the Soviet Union, SS-Gruppenführer Reinhard Heydrich ordered that the German Einsatzgruppen operating behind the Eastern Front should secretly provoke the local population to antisemitic actions, taking control of them if necessary. Following these instructions, the residents' outrage in Lviv was exploited to incite pogrom sentiments. The Wehrmacht and Schutzstaffel not only tolerated violence against Lviv's Jews but also incited and supported it. The Banderite faction of the Organisation of Ukrainian Nationalists also fueled antisemitic sentiments, although, according to Grzegorz Motyka, the participation of its rank-and-file members in the pogroms does not necessarily mean that its leadership was involved in their organization.

Immediately after the Wehrmacht entered Lviv, posters appeared on the walls calling for retaliation against communists and Jews. By the morning of June 30, Ukrainian People's Militsiya, mainly consisting of the Organisation of Ukrainian Nationalists members and supported by lower-class Ukrainians, began to search the city, pulling Jewish residents from their homes and capturing Jewish passersby. The detainees – men and, in some districts, women and children – were informed they would be sent to forced labor. Some victims were herded into clearing the streets of Lviv amidst jeers, insults, and brutal beatings. Between one thousand and several thousand Jews were forced into the prisons, where they were made to participate in the exhumation of the Soviet massacre victims. During this work, they were subjected to insults, forced to wash in water previously used to clean decomposing bodies, and brutally beaten and tortured. In those days, hundreds of Jews, including Dr. Jecheskiel Lewin, the rabbi of the Reform Judaism, and Henryk Hescheles, editor of the newspaper Chwila, were shot, bayoneted, or beaten to death within the prisons. Alongside Ukrainian civilians and militsiya, individual German soldiers and, according to witness accounts, (Note: According to Motyka (2006, p. 96), the question of the participation of members of the Nachtigall Battalion in the Lviv pogroms has not yet been resolved.) members of the Nachtigall Battalion took part in the pogrom. The riots were not quelled until July 2, when Colonel Karl Wintergerst, the military commandant of Lviv, issued an order. By then, at least 3,000– 4,000, and possibly up to 7,000, Lviv Jews had fallen victim to the pogrom.

Another pogrom, known as the Petlura Days, was orchestrated and directed by the Germans from 25 to 27 July 1941. Ukrainian militsiya brought in from surrounding villages, supported by the Polish underclass, looted and demolished Jewish homes, beating and expelling their inhabitants. Many Jews were driven to the prison on Łącki Street, where they were imprisoned and subjected to brutal treatment. The Petlura Days pogrom resulted in the deaths of at least 1,500 Lviv Jews, with some sources estimating the number of murdered at up to 6,000.

The NKVD prisoner massacres also served as a pretext for the Germans to carry out mass and systematic executions of Lviv's Jews. At the end of June and the beginning of July 1941, the headquarters and subunits of Einsatzgruppe C, Sicherheitsdienst and Sicherheitspolizei operational group led by SS-Brigadeführer Dr. Otto Rasch, arrived in Lviv. A few days after their arrival, the Schutzstaffel, supported by Ukrainian militsiya, arrested thousands of Jewish men, who were gathered at a disused hockey rink and brutally treated. A small number of detainees were selected for forced labor, while the rest were gradually transported to forests outside Lviv and shot. According to preserved German reports, by July 16, the security police had gathered and shot about 7,000 Jews in retaliation for the inhuman crimes. The executions were carried out by members of Einsatzgruppe C, Ordnungspolizei officers, and Wehrmacht soldiers. Post-war testimonies from members of Rasch's unit indicate that the mass executions of Lviv Jews were ordered by Adolf Hitler himself. (Note: Erwin Schulz, commander of one of the subunits of Einsatzgruppe C (EK 5), testified: Dr. Rasch informed us that Jewish officials and residents of Lviv were involved in the killings. [...] The next day, he informed us that Hitler's order had come into effect, according to which the perpetrators of these murders, as well as those clearly suspected of them, were to be executed in retaliation. Meanwhile, Erhard Kroeger, commander of another subunit executing Lviv's Jews (EK 6), claimed that Rasch informed him that an order from Hitler had been issued to the appropriate Wehrmacht authorities, according to which the murders committed by the Red Army in Lviv, reported in the meantime, were to be punished with exceptional severity – by executing all those responsible, even those only slightly guilty (Schenk (2011, p. 115); Musiał (2001, p. 226)).)

== Utilization of the atrocities for propaganda ==
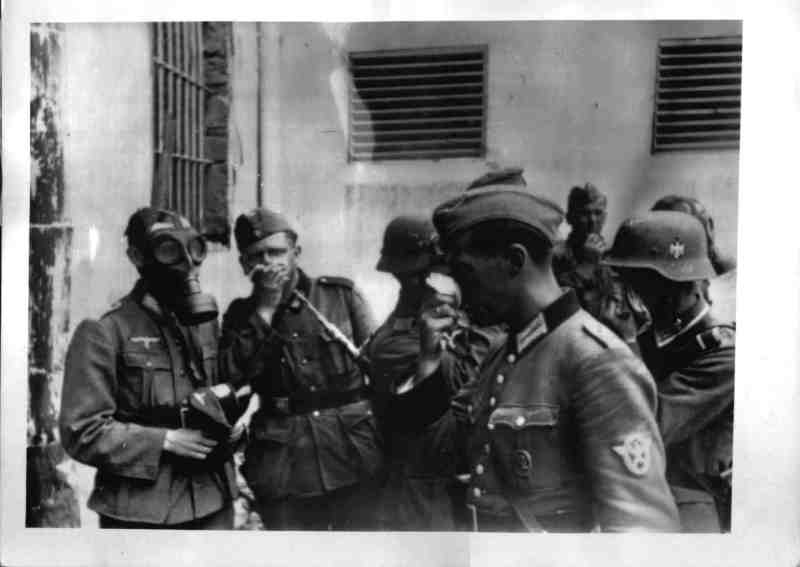
German soldiers visiting the massacre site

The massacres committed by the NKVD were extensively exploited by Nazi propaganda. Minister Joseph Goebbels decided to use the atrocities in Lviv as a "textbook example" of Soviet brutality. Foreign journalists accredited in Berlin were invited to the city. The crimes were widely reported by the German press and radio, with photos of the mutilated victims being published, and shocking films shot in Lviv prisons by propaganda ministry crews shown in cinemas. A special Wehrmacht team also filmed the pogrom of the Jewish population in the first days of July. The shock among German soldiers caused by the Soviet crimes was used to boost morale and fuel hatred against the Soviets and Jews. The commander of one of the battalions of the 1st Mountain Division ordered his soldiers to visit one of the Lviv prisons to understand the necessity of fighting against the Jewish-Communist gang of criminals.

Nazi propaganda exclusively portrayed Ukrainians, Balts, and Volksdeutsche as victims of the NKVD prisoner massacres. It did not mention that many Poles and Jews were also among the murdered, likely fearing that this information might evoke sympathy for these nations among the German populace and undermine the thesis of universal Jewish collaboration with the Soviets. In Lviv, Ukrainian nationalists obstructed the commemoration of Poles murdered in the prisons by the NKVD. Only in the General Government did propaganda directed at the Polish population emphasize that many Poles were among the murdered. At the same time, it concealed information about Jewish victims and sought to use Soviet crimes to fuel anti-semitic sentiments.

In response to the international outcry over the NKVD crimes in Lviv and other cities, Soviet propaganda was compelled to react. It denied any Soviet responsibility for the prisoner massacres and blamed the Germans instead. This narrative was maintained until the last days of the Soviet Union. During a propaganda campaign conducted in the late 1950s and early 1960s, Soviet propaganda held the Ukrainian Nachtigall Battalion responsible for the Lviv massacres, aiming to discredit Theodor Oberländer – the Federal Minister for Expellees in the West German government, who had been a liaison officer with this unit during the war.

== In culture ==
The exhumation of NKVD victims in one of Lviv's prisons and the simultaneous pogrom of the Jewish population were depicted in Jonathan Littell's novel The Kindly Ones.

Agnieszka Gajewska has suggested that some works by Stanisław Lem (such as His Master's Voice, Eden, and The Invincible) allude to the NKVD prisoner massacres and the subsequent pogroms of Lviv's Jews. The apartment building where the Lem family lived in June 1941 was located near the Brygidki prison, making it possible that the writer referenced his own wartime experiences in these works.

== Bibliography ==
- Kalbarczyk, Sławomir (2010). "Martyrologia Polaków w więzieniu przy ulicy Łąckiego we Lwowie w latach II wojny światowej". Biuletyn IPN (in Polish). 7–8 (116–117).
- Mazur, Grzegorz; Skwara, Jerzy; Węgierski, Jerzy (2007). Kronika 2350 dni wojny i okupacji Lwowa 1 IX 1939 – 5 II 1946 (in Polish). Katowice: Unia Jerzy Skwara. ISBN 978-83-86250-49-3.
- Motyka, Grzegorz (2006). Ukraińska partyzantka 1942–1960. Działalność Organizacji Ukraińskich Nacjonalistów i Ukraińskiej Powstańczej Armii (in Polish). Warsaw: Rytm. ISBN 83-88490-58-3.
- Musiał, Bogdan (2001). Rozstrzelać elementy kontrrewolucyjne. Brutalizacja wojny niemiecko-sowieckiej latem 1941 roku (in Polish). Warsaw: Stowarzyszenie Kulturalne Fronda. ISBN 83-88747-40-1.
- Popiński, Krzysztof; Kokurin, Aleksandr; Gurjanow, Aleksandr (1995). Drogi śmierci. Ewakuacja więzień sowieckich z Kresów Wschodnich II Rzeczypospolitej w czerwcu i lipcu 1941 (in Polish). Warsaw: Karta. ISBN 83-900676-9-2.
- Schenk, Dieter (2011). Noc morderców. Kaźń polskich profesorów we Lwowie i holokaust w Galicji Wschodniej (in Polish). Kraków: Wysoki Zamek. ISBN 978-83-931373-5-0.
- Solonin, Mark (2015). Czerwiec 1941. Ostateczna diagnoza (in Polish). Poznań: Rebis. ISBN 978-83-7818-616-8.
- Węgierski, Jerzy (1991). Lwów pod okupacją sowiecką 1939–1941 (in Polish). Warsaw: Editions Spotkania. ISBN 83-85195-15-7.
- Wnuk, Rafał (2007). "Za pierwszego Sowieta". Polska konspiracja na Kresach Wschodnich II Rzeczypospolitej (wrzesień 1939 – czerwiec 1941) (in Polish). Warsaw: Instytut Pamięci Narodowej and Instytut Studiów Politycznych PAN. ISBN 978-83-60464-47-2.
- Mikoda, Janina (1997). Zbrodnicza ewakuacja więzień i aresztów NKWD na Kresach Wschodnich II Rzeczypospolitej w czerwcu – lipcu 1941 roku. Materiały z sesji naukowej w 55. rocznicę ewakuacji więźniów NKWD w głąb ZSRR, Łódź 10 czerwca 1996 r (in Polish). Warsaw: GKBZpNP-IPN. ISBN 83-903356-6-2.
