= Lviv pogroms (1941) =

Genocidal massacres of Jews in 1941 Ukraine

Lviv pogroms of 1941
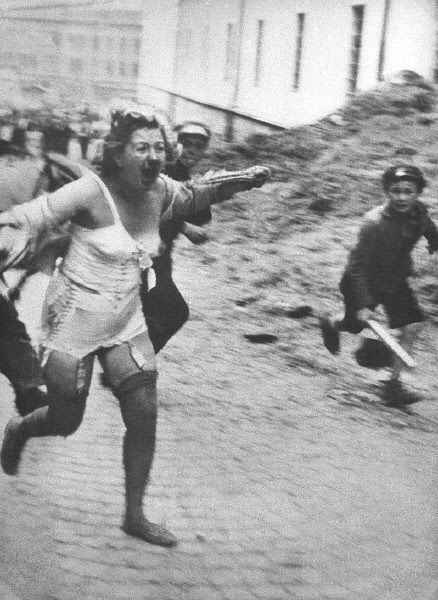
- A Jewish woman chased by men and youth during the pogrom
- Date: June 1941 – July 1941
- Location: Lviv, Eastern Poland/Western Ukraine; 49.510°N 24.010°E
- Type: Beatings, sexual abuse, robberies, mass murder
- Participants: German Einsatzgruppe C Ukrainian nationalists (OUN-B); Local crowds
- Deaths: Thousands of Jews (see estimates)

The Lviv pogroms were the consecutive pogroms and massacres of Jews in June and July 1941 in the city of Lwów in German-occupied Eastern Poland/Western Ukraine (now Lviv, Ukraine). The massacres were perpetrated by Ukrainian nationalists (specifically, the OUN), German death squads (Einsatzgruppen), and urban population from 30 June to 2 July, and from 25 to 29 July, during the German invasion of the Soviet Union. Thousands of Jews were killed both in the pogroms and in the Einsatzgruppen killings.

Ukrainian militia as well as Ukrainian residents and to a lower degree Poles targeted Jews in the first pogrom, which was triggered by the discovery of thousands of bodies in three Lviv prisons of victims of the Soviet NKVD prisoner massacres, which were widely blamed on "Jewish Bolsheviks". The subsequent massacres were directed by the Germans in the context of the Holocaust in Eastern Europe. The pogroms have been widely debated in the historiography, including the extent to which Ukrainian nationalists played a central or complicit role.

== Background ==
Lwów (modern: Lviv) was a multicultural city just before World War II, with a population of 312,231. It was part of the Second Polish Republic from 1918 to 1939. The city's 157,490 ethnic Poles constituted just over 50 per cent, with Jews at 32 per cent (99,595) and Ukrainians at 16 per cent (49,747). On 28 September 1939, after the joint Soviet-German invasion, the USSR and Germany signed the German–Soviet Frontier Treaty, which assigned about 200,000 km^{2} (77,000 sq mi) of Polish territory inhabited by 13.5 million people of all nationalities to the Soviet Union. Lviv was then annexed to the Soviet Union.

According to Soviet Secret Police (NKVD) records, nearly 9,000 prisoners were murdered in the Ukrainian SSR in the NKVD prisoner massacres, after the German invasion of the Soviet Union began on 22 June 1941. Due to the confusion during the rapid Soviet retreat and incomplete records, the NKVD number is most likely an undercounting. According to estimates by contemporary historians, the number of victims in Western Ukraine was probably between 10,000 and 40,000. By ethnicity, Ukrainians comprised roughly 70 per cent of victims, with Poles at 20 per cent.

According to scholar Jeffrey Kopstein, the Polish population "awaited the German arrival with a mixture of fear and hope", having resented their loss of control of the city under Soviet occupation. The Ukrainian minority had been "nominal owners" of the city since 1939 but "the Ukrainian nationalist intelligentsia ... found Soviet rule a huge disappointment, an insult to their hopes for a truly independent Ukraine. They hoped for German liberation and German help in recapturing the city as the capital of their own nation-building project." Prior to the German invasion of the Soviet Union, some Ukrainian nationalists, specifically in the Organization of Ukrainian Nationalists (OUN), had been working with the Germans.

As the historian John-Paul Himka writes, the OUN at this point was a divided organization: in Lviv, the splinter faction loyal to Stepan Bandera, known as OUN-B, led locally by Yaroslav Stetsko, "a prominent lieutenant of Bandera's as well as an extreme anti-Semite", took over the nationalist movement. In 1939, Stetsko published an article in which he claimed that Jews were "nomads and parasites", a nation of "swindlers" and "egotists" whose aim was to "corrupt the heroic culture of warrior nations". Stetsko also railed against the supposed conspiracy between Jewish capitalists and Jewish Communists. The OUN-B nationally called Jews props of the Bolsheviks, but explicitly called on Ukrainians to eschew anti-Jewish pogroms (seen as a diversion from targeting the real enemy, Moscow) at its Second Great Congress, held in Kraków in April 1941. Nonetheless, the local OUN-B's preparations for the anticipated German invasion included May 1941 instructions for ethnic cleansing to its planned militia units: "At a time of chaos and confusion it is permissible to liquidate undesirable Polish, Russian, and Jewish activists, especially supporters". "Russians, Poles, Jews" were hostile to the Ukrainian nation and were to be "destroyed in battle".

== Pogroms and mass killings ==
=== First pogrom ===
External videos
- Published by the United States Holocaust Memorial Museum
- Atrocities Against Jews

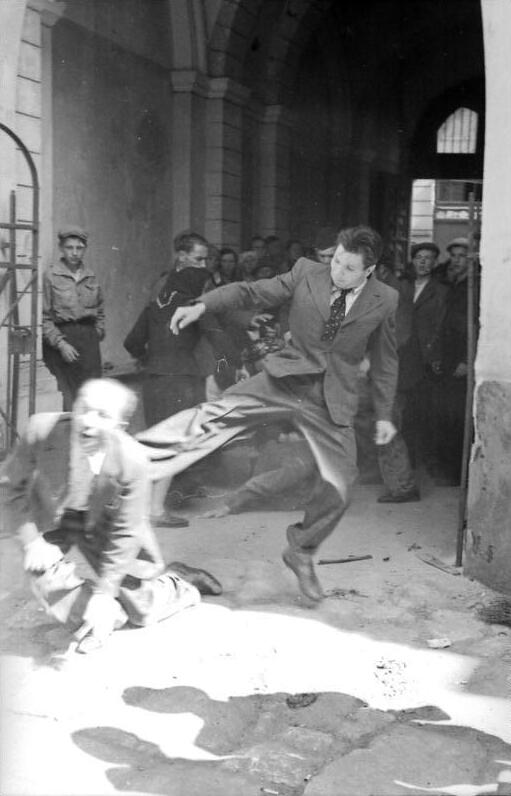
Local Ukrainians abuse a Jew, probably during the pogrom in July 1941. Photo was taken by a Wehrmacht propaganda company.

At the time of the German attack on the Soviet Union, about 160,000 Jews lived in the city; the number had swelled by tens of thousands due to the arrival of Jewish refugees from German occupied Poland in late 1939.

Lviv was occupied by the Wehrmacht in the early hours of 30 June 1941; German forces consisted of the 1st Mountain Division and the Abwehr-subordinated Nachtigall Battalion staffed by ethnic Ukrainians. That day, Jews were press-ganged by the Germans to remove bodies of NKVD's victims from the prisons and to perform other tasks, such as clearing bomb damage and cleaning buildings. Some Jews were abused by the Germans and even murdered, according to survivors. During the afternoon of the same day, the German military reported that the Lviv population was taking out its anger about the prison murders "on the Jews ... who had always collaborated with the Bolsheviks". During the morning of 30 June, an ad hoc Ukrainian People's Militia was being formed in the city. It included OUN activists who had moved in from Kraków with the Germans, OUN members who lived in Lviv, and former Soviet policemen—who had either decided to switch sides or who were OUN members that had infiltrated the Soviet police. The OUN encouraged violence against Jews, which began in the afternoon of 30 June, with active participation from the Ukrainian militia who could be identified by armbands in national colours: yellow and blue. Former Soviet policemen wore their blue Soviet uniforms, but with a Ukrainian trident instead of a red star on their hats. Flyers distributed by OUN in the first days of the German invasion instructed the population: "Don't throw away your weapons yet. Take them up. Destroy the enemy. ... Moscow, the Hungarians, the Jews—these are your enemies. Destroy them."

During the evening of 30 June, Ukrainian nationalists proclaimed an independent Ukrainian state. Signed by Stetsko, the proclamation ("Act of restoration of the Ukrainian state") declared OUN's affinity and future collaboration with Nazi Germany which, according to OUN, was "helping the Ukrainian people liberate themselves from Muscovite occupation". At the same time, the news was spreading around the city about the discovery of thousands of corpses in three city prisons in the aftermath of the NKVD massacres.

A full-blown pogrom began on the next day, 1 July. Jews were taken from their apartments, made to clean streets on their hands and knees, or perform rituals that identified them with Communism. Gentile residents assembled in the streets to watch. Jewish women were singled out for humiliation: they were stripped naked, beaten, and abused. On one such occasion, a German military propaganda company filmed the scene. Rapes were also reported. Jews continued to be brought to the three prisons, first to exhume the bodies and then to be killed. At least two members of the OUN-B, Ivan Kovalyshyn and Mykhaylo Pecharsʹkyy, have been identified by the historian John Paul Himka from photographs of the pogrom.

According to Himka, although Jews were not considered by the OUN to be their primary enemies (this role was reserved for Poles and Russians), they likely targeted Lviv Jews in an attempt to curry favour with the Germans, in the hopes of being allowed to establish a puppet Ukrainian state. The antisemitism of OUN's leaders, especially Stetsko's, was also a contributory factor. More recently, Ksenya Kiebuzinski and Alexander Motyl have emphasised the range of contributory factors, including: the visibility of Jewish activists in Communist ranks (despite the fact that a minority of Jews supported the Soviet occupation), fuelling a widespread perception from Polish and Ukrainian residents that Jews supported Communism and the Soviet Union, a perception shaped by prevalent antisemitism among Ukrainian and Polish communities, who had little meaningful interaction with Jewish neighbours and refugees. Kiebuzinski and Motyl also emphasise the role of Nazi propaganda in instigating the violence.

Jeffrey Kopstein shows that the Germans eagerly facilitated anti-Jewish violence by locals, but that such violence occurred in places where they were not present, so their presence in Lvov facilitated it and made it more brutal, but was not the sufficient or necessary cause. He notes that resentment towards Soviet occupation was clearly a factor, but that known ethnic Ukrainian Soviet collaborators were spared. The role of Ukrainian nationalists was therefore significant, but "any account [of the pogroms] as primarily an OUN operation misses something important. The OUN was a small organization spread thinly on the ground. They tried to recruit locals, but adherence was spotty and opportunistic... excessive focus on their role risks overlooking an essential feature...: the participation of broad segments of the Ukrainian population in the pogrom's mass, carnivalesque character." Kopstein also emphasises the role of Zionism as a powerful current among Lvov Jews (in contrast to parts of western Ukraine where Zionist support was low or Communist support was high, which tended to have fewer pogroms) that meant it was seen as a threat by both Polish and Ukrainian nationalists.

=== Einsatzgruppen killings ===
Sub-units of Einsatzgruppe C arrived on 2 July, at which point violence escalated further. More Jews were brought to the prisons where they were shot and buried in freshly dug pits. It was also at this point that the Ukrainian militia was subordinated to the SS. In addition to participation in the pogrom, Einsatzgruppe C conducted a series of mass-murder operations which continued for the next few days. Unlike the "prison actions", these shootings were marked by the absence of crowd participation. With assistance from Ukrainian militia, Jews were herded into a stadium, from where they were taken on trucks to the shooting site.

The Ukrainian militia received assistance from the organisational structures of OUN, unorganized ethnic nationalists, as well as from ordinary crowds and underage youth. German military personnel were frequently on the scene as both onlookers and perpetrators, apparently approving of the anti-Jewish violence and humiliation. During the afternoon of 2 July, the Germans stopped the rioting, confirming that the situation was ultimately under their control from the beginning.

=== "Petliura Days" ===
A second pogrom took place in the last days of July 1941 and was called "Petliura Days" (Aktion Petliura) after the assassinated Ukrainian leader Symon Petliura. The killings were organized with German encouragement, while Ukrainian militants from outside the city joined the fray with farm tools. In the morning of 25 July, militants began to assemble at the city's police stations. Accompanied by the Ukrainian Auxiliary Police, they assaulted Jews on the streets with clubs, axes and knives. In the afternoon, arrests and looting began. Consulting prepared lists, policemen arrested Jews in their homes, while civilians participated in acts of violence against Jews in the streets. Many were killed out of sight. According to Yad Vashem, about 2,000 people were murdered in approximately three days.

== Number of victims ==
The estimates for the total number of victims vary. A subsequent account by the Lviv Judenrat estimated that 2,000 Jews disappeared or were killed in the first days of July. A German security report of 16 July stated that 7,000 Jews were "captured and shot". The former is possibly an undercounting, while the German numbers are likely exaggerated, in order to impress higher command.

According to the Encyclopedia of Camps and Ghettos, 1933–1945, the first pogrom resulted in 2,000 to 5,000 Jewish victims. An additional 2,500 to 3,000 Jews were shot in the Einsatzgruppen killings that immediately followed. During the so-called "Petliura Days" massacre of late July, more than 1,000 Jews were killed. According to the historian Peter Longerich, the first pogrom cost at least 4,000 lives. It was followed by the additional 2,500 to 3,000 arrests and executions in subsequent Einsatzgruppen killings, with "Petliura Days" resulting in more than 2,000 victims.

The historian Dieter Pohl estimates that 4,000 of Lviv's Jews were killed in the pogroms between 1 and 25 July. According to the historian Richard Breitman, 5,000 Jews died as a result of the pogroms. In addition, some 3,000 people, mostly Jews, were executed in the municipal stadium by the Germans.

== Aftermath ==
German propaganda passed off all victims of the NKVD killings in Lviv as Ukrainians, although about one-third of the names on the prisoner lists were distinctly Polish or Jewish. Over the next two years both German and pro-Nazi Ukrainian press—including Ukrains'ki shchodenni visti and Krakivs'ki visti—went on to describe horrific acts of chekist (Soviet secret police) torture, real or imagined. German propaganda newsreels implicated Soviet Jews in the killing of Ukrainians, and were broadcast across occupied Europe.

In declaring the Ukrainian state, the OUN leadership hoped that the Nazi authorities would accept a fascist Ukraine as a puppet state. These hopes had been fueled by the circle around Alfred Rosenberg, who was subsequently appointed as head of the Reich Ministry for the Occupied Eastern Territories and within Abwehr. Hitler, however, was adamantly opposed to Ukrainian statehood, having set his sights on the ruthless economic exploitation of the newly acquired colonial territories. Bandera was arrested on 5 July and placed under house arrest in Berlin. On 15 September, he was again arrested and spent the next three years as a privileged political prisoner in Germany. He was released in October 1944 to resume his cooperation with the Germans.

The Nachtigall Battalion was not directly implicated in the Lviv pogrom as an organised formation. Survivors observed Ukrainians in Wehrmacht uniforms participating in the pogroms, but it remains unclear what role the battalion played. The Ukrainian speakers may have been translators attached to other units. Nevertheless, records show that the Nachtigall Battalion subsequently took part in the mass shootings of Jews near Vinnytsia in July 1941.

The Lwów Ghetto was established in November 1941 on the orders of SS-Brigadeführer Fritz Katzmann, the SS and Police Leader (SSPF) of Lemberg. At its peak, the ghetto held some 120,000 Jews, most of whom were deported to the Belzec extermination camp or killed locally during the next two years. Following the 1941 pogroms and Einsatzgruppe killings, harsh conditions in the ghetto and deportations to Belzec and the Janowska concentration camp had resulted in the almost complete annihilation of the Jewish population. By the time Soviet forces reached Lviv on 21 July 1944, less than 1 per cent of Lviv's Jews had survived the occupation.

For decades after the war, the pogroms in Western Ukraine received limited academic attention and were mostly discussed in the context of the series of photographs taken during the Lviv pogrom. The photographs have been variously described by historians as "infamous", "horrific", and "almost iconic". Some of the footage and photographs of the first pogrom were misinterpreted as showing NKVD's victims. In fact, these images showed Jewish victims killed after they had exhumed the bodies. They can be identified by white shirts and suspenders, which would have been prohibited in prisons, along with the haphazard body positions. In contrast, NKVD's victims were laid out neatly in rows and had dull-grey clothes.

== Historiography and historical memory ==
The memory and historiography of the pogroms have been widely contested. Soviet historiography downplayed the ethnicity of both victims and perpetrators, emphasising Nazi German violence against Soviet citizens. Ukrainian nationalist accounts have typically downplayed the role of the OUN in the violence, and some recent historians, such as Per Anders Rudling and John-Paul Himka have sought to rebalance this, emphasised the role of antisemitism in the Ukrainian nationalist movement, and documented OUN attempts to absolve Ukrainians of responsibility. Other historians, such as Alexander J. Motyl, have criticised Himka's position as one-sided, and emphasised the complexity of the events, including Polish participation.

According to Rudling, OUN's denials of its role in the Holocaust began in 1943 after it became obvious that Germany would lose the war. In October 1943, OUN issued instructions for preparation of materials that would suggest that Germans and Poles bore responsibility for anti-Jewish violence. Further, OUN wanted to spread disinformation that Lviv's Jewish council blamed Ukrainians for the pogroms only because it was under pressure from Germans to do so. The tone of OUN's leaflets and proclamations also changed, omitting the explicit antisemitic references which they had previously contained.

According to Rudling, the "whitewashing" continued after the war, with OUN's propaganda describing its legacy as a "heroic Ukrainian resistance against the Nazis and the Communists". This was accompanied by a flood of memoirs from veterans of OUN, Ukrainian Insurgent Army (UPA, which became dominated by OUN members) and SS Division Galicia. OUN closely guarded its archives, limiting access to information and retyping, back-dating, and censoring its documents before releasing them to scholars. OUN also developed ties to Ukrainian diaspora across the Atlantic, including academics of Ukrainian descent, such as OUN veteran and historian Taras Hunczak and UPA veteran and historian Lev Shankovsky. These academics, in turn, produced accounts sympathetic to OUN. After the opening of the Soviet archives in the 1990s, it became possible to compare OUN's version of history to authentic documents.

Modern Lviv is 90 per cent Ukrainian. In Soviet Ukraine, as elsewhere in the Soviet Union, Jews, the primary targets of the Nazi genocide, were subsumed into undifferentiated Soviet civilian victims of the war. In post-Soviet Ukraine, the new commemorative practices focused primarily on Lviv's Ukrainian past, while the lost Jewish and Polish populations were largely ignored. Some of these practices have been problematic. For example, the site of the Prison on Łącki Street, one of the several locations of the "prison action" in July 1941, is now a museum. Its permanent exhibition (as of 2014) did not mention the pogrom. No memorial to the Jewish victims of the pogrom existed in the same timeframe.

In 2008, the Security Service of Ukraine (SBU) released documents which it stated indicated that the OUN may have been involved to a lesser degree than originally thought. According to scholars John-Paul Himka, Per Anders Rudling, and Marco Carynnyk, this collection of documents, titled "For the Beginning: Book of Facts" (Do pochatku knyha faktiv), was an attempt at manipulating and falsifying of World War II history. For example, one of the documents released was an allegedly contemporaneous chronicle of OUN's activities in 1941. In fact, it was clear from the document itself that it was a post-war production. According to Himka, all that this document proved was that OUN wanted to dissociate itself from anti-Jewish violence to aid in its goals of establishing a relationship with the West. The SBU also relied on the "memoirs" of a Stella Krenzbach, who was purportedly a Ukrainian Jew fighting in the ranks of the UPA. The memoirs and the figure of Krenzbach herself were likely post-war fabrications by the nationalist Ukrainian diaspora.

More recently, Ksenya Kiebuzinski and Alexander Motyl have criticised historians such as Himka who place too much explanatory emphasis on Ukrainian nationalists. Among their criticisms are: 1) The emphasis on nationalist responsibility "transposes the (relatively few) anti-Semitic statements or writings of (mostly émigré) nationalists and nationalist intellectuals to rank-and-file nationalists in Western Ukraine, without asking whether the latter even read and assimilated these writings and what the sources of their attitudes to Jews and other ethnic groups were." 2) "Poles took part in the pogroms, and it makes little sense to claim that they were incited by their political adversaries, Ukrainian nationalists". 3) Jewish eyewitnesses and survivors emphasize that perpetrators on the ground were not necessarily political but petty criminals. 4) As Timothy Snyder argues, similar forms of violence occurred in areas (such as Eastern Ukraine) where the OUN had no influence. 5) At a national level, OUN-B opposed anti-Jewish violence, and the local group's involvement does not reflect an organisation-wide programme.

== See also ==
- History of the Jews in Poland
- History of the Jews in Ukraine
- Jedwabne pogrom
- Kaunas pogrom
- Żydokomuna
