= Battle of Lwów (1941) =

1941 battle

- Part of Operation Barbarossa on the Eastern Front of World War II
Date	22–30 June 1941
Location	Lwów, Soviet-occupied Poland 49°50′33″N 24°01′56″E
Result	German and Ukrainian victory: Subsequent pogroms; Massacre of Lwów professors

Belligerents
Germany (Ukrainian Insurgent Army) OUN-B	Soviet Union

Commanders and leaders
(Nazi Germany) Carl-Heinrich von Stülpnagel (Ukrainian Insurgent Army) Yaroslav Stetsko	(Soviet Union) Ivan Muzychenko (Soviet Union) Nikolai Dyatlov

Strength
(Nazi Germany) 17th Army (Ukrainian Insurgent Army) OUN marching groups	(Soviet Union) 6th Combined Arms Army

The Battle of Lwów was a World War II battle for the control over the city of Lwów (now Lviv, Ukraine) between the Red Army and the invading Wehrmacht and the Organisation of Ukrainian Nationalists.

== History ==
Protection of the city’s infrastructure was carried out by the 223rd regiment from the 13th division of the NKVD escort troops. On 24 June the 1st company of the regiment prevented the mass escape from Lvov Prison No. 1. Also, the soldiers of the regiment defended the city from the actions of looters, OUN members and Nazi saboteurs. From 29 to 30 June 1941 the regiment’s battalion covered the withdrawal of units of the 6th army from Lviv and then departed along the route Sykhov-Bóbrka-Rohatyn-Kozova-Tarnopol under the direct influence of the Luftwaffe.

Immediately after the departure of the Red Army, NKVD troops and border guards, the massacre of Lviv professors and Lviv pogrom was organized, and then the ghetto and concentration camps began to form under the leadership of the German administration by the Ukrainian auxiliary police, formed from the OUN marching groups.

The city was liberated from the Nazis three years later, in the summer of 1944, during the Lvov–Sandomierz Offensive.

== See also ==
- Lwów Ghetto
