= Prison on Łącki Street =

Museum in Lviv, Ukraine

National Museum-Memorial of Victims of the Occupation Regimes "Loncky Street Prison"
- Національний музей-меморіал жертв окупаційних режимів «Тюрма на Лонцького»
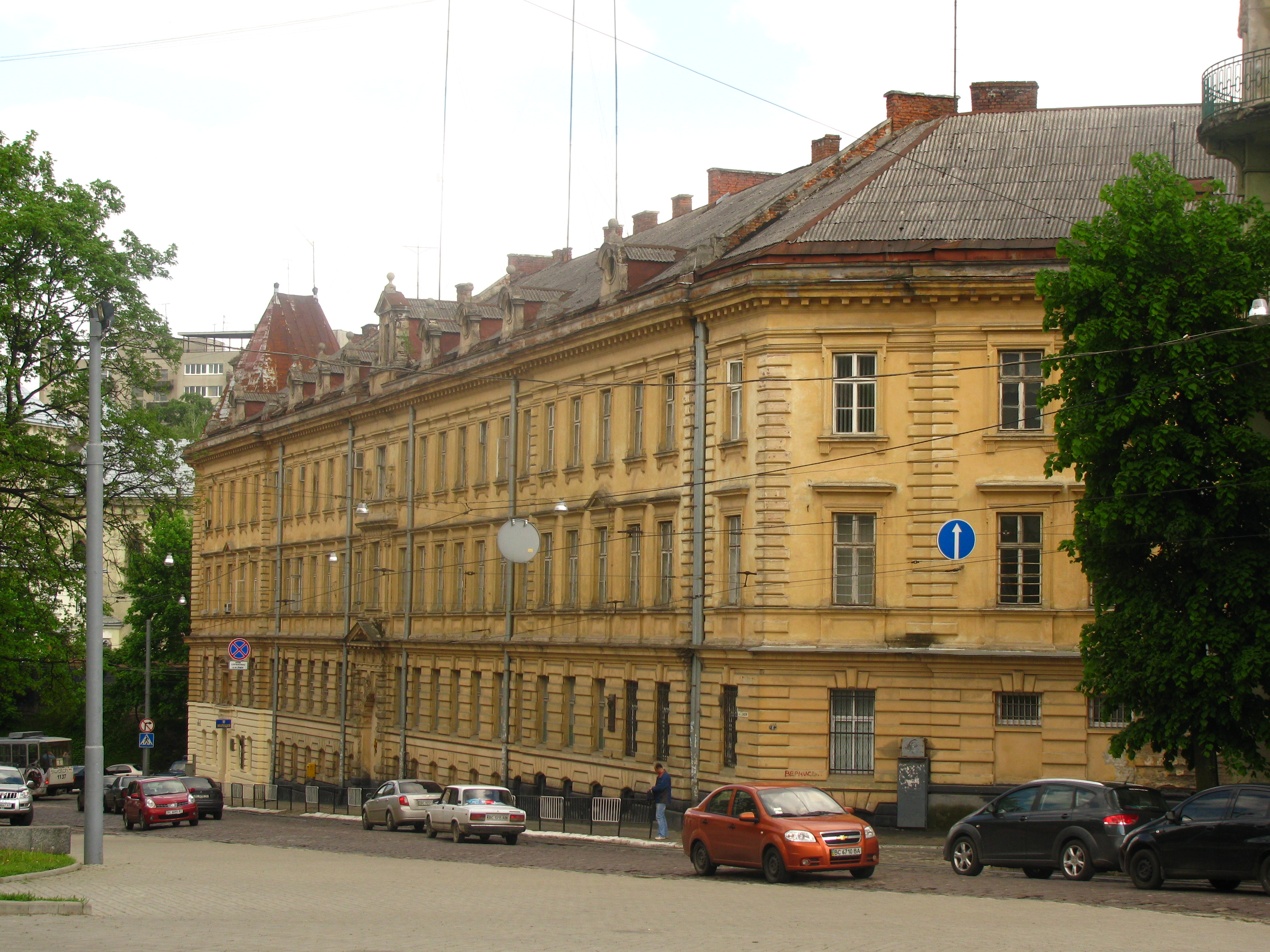
- Established: 2009
- Location: Frankivskyi District, Lviv, Ukraine
- Coordinates: 49°50′N 24°01′E
- Type: National history museum, prison museum
- Visitors: 18,542 (2014)
- Founders: Center for Research of Liberation Movement (supported by Security Service of Ukraine, local government)
- Director: Ruslan Zabilyi
- Curator: Center for Research of Liberation Movement
- Architect: Józef Kajetan Janowski
- Owner: Government of Ukraine (Ministry of Culture)
- Website: www.lonckoho.lviv.ua

Immovable Monument of Local Significance of Ukraine
- Official name: Казарми та управління жандармерії (Barracks and gendarmerie administration)
- Type: Architecture
- Reference no.: 4029-Лв

The National Museum-Memorial of Victims of the Occupation Regimes (Ukrainian: Національний музей-меморіал жертв окупаційних режимів, romanized: Natsionalnyi muzei-memorial zhertv okupatsiinykh rezhymiv), or the Prison on Łącki Street (Тюрма на Лонцького, Tiurma na Lontskoho), is a former detention center in Lviv, Ukraine, that throughout the 20th century was primarily used as a political prison by the Polish, Nazi and Soviet regimes.

The museum houses a main office of the Center for Research of Liberation Movement.

== Name ==
The prison's name derives from the former name of the street upon which the main entrance was located. Formerly known in Polish as ulica Eliasza Łąckiego (Łącki Street), and today known in Ukrainian as vulytsia Karla Briullova (Bryullov Street), the road is a side street of the main thoroughfare, vulytsia Stepana Bandery (Bandera Street). Łącki Street was named after Eliasz Łącki, who was a Polish war hero of the 1672–76 Polish–Ottoman War during the 1672 siege of Lwów.

== History ==
=== Austria-Hungary ===
The building complex was built in 1889–1890 at the intersection of ulica Sapiehy (today vulytsia Bandery) and ulica Kopernika on the project of architect Józef Kajetan Janowski. It is built in a Neo-Renaissance style and originally was designed for Austro-Hungarian Gendarmerie's main office in the city.

=== Second Polish Republic ===
The portion where the prison was actually located was built soon after World War I in 1918–1920 when Lviv was part of the Second Polish Republic.

The prison portion housed the Fourth Department of the State Police Main Commandant's Office, one duty of which included a fight against "anti-government" organizations such as Organization of Ukrainian Nationalists, Communist Party of Western Ukraine and others. Unofficially the prison was intended for political prisoners. In 1935 the investigating department of police was quartered in the building, while the prison was turned into a detention center.

=== World War II ===
External videos
- Footage of the German video-journal Wochenschau that show the state of Prison on Łąckiego after withdrawal of the Soviet Army from Lviv
- NKVD LVOV 1941Crime in the territory of Western Ukraine

With the start of World War II in 1939 and the partition of the Second Polish Republic between Nazi Germany and Soviet Union, the prison was transformed into the NKVD Prison No.1 which was designed to accommodate 1,500 prisoners. The regional administration of NKVD took up quarters in the building. During the Nazi invasion of the Soviet Union, the NKVD shot the prisoners held in the prison when Soviet forces retreated from Lviv, killing 1681 people.

In June and July 1941, the prison was the site of several atrocities committed by the OUN and the Nazi SS against the Jewish population of Lviv during the Lviv pogroms.

During 1941-1944 the building was used as a Gestapo detention center and housed an office of Einsatzgruppen of Sicherheitsdienst (SD). From July 21 to 26, 1941 former Polish Prime Minister Kazimierz Bartel was imprisoned here.

=== Soviet Ukraine ===
During the Anti-Soviet resistance by the Ukrainian Insurgent Army in the decade following World War II, a number of members of the OUN were held in the prison.

From the 1960 to the 1980s, a number of Ukrainian dissidents were held in the prison, including Viacheslav Chornovil and Iryna Kalynets.

=== Post-Soviet Ukraine ===
In 2009, the prison building was turned into a museum, under the ownership of the Security Service of Ukraine (SBU). Ahead of the 2010 Ukrainian presidential election, plans were made to have the Ukrainian Institute of National Memory assume jurisdiction over the museum; however, those plans were cancelled following the appointment of Mykola Azarov as Prime Minister.

In September 2010, the museum's director Ruslan Zabily was arrested by the SBU and detained for over 14 hours without a warrant, with his laptop and research material being confiscated, and was accused by the SBU of leaking state secrets. The Ukrainian Helsinki Human Rights Union described the arrest as "illegal," comparing it to a crackdown in Russia "against historians studying the history of political repression." After being released Zabily held a press conference in which he accused the government of seeking to repress research into the history of the Organization of Ukrainian Nationalists. In February 2011, Zabily was once again detained by the SBU and interrogated for five hours.

== Controversy ==
The National Museum-Memorial of Victims of the Occupation Regimes has faced criticism for minimising the crimes of the Nazi occupation regime during World War II and crimes committed by Ukrainian ultra-nationalists during the same period. Historian John-Paul Himka stated in 2015 that the museum "glides lightly over the Nazi occupation" and that it "glorifies OUN without mentioning or admitting that the militia associated with OUN was deeply involved in murders and other atrocities against Jews on the very premises of the Lontsky St. prison." Alexandra Wachter of the University of Vienna stated in 2017 that the museum "focuses on the heroism of OUN and UPA activists and omits the local involvement in the Holocaust that might question this heroism," also saying that what Nazi material is presented in the museum is presented "without communicating its original propagandistic, anti-Semitic nature."

== Gallery ==
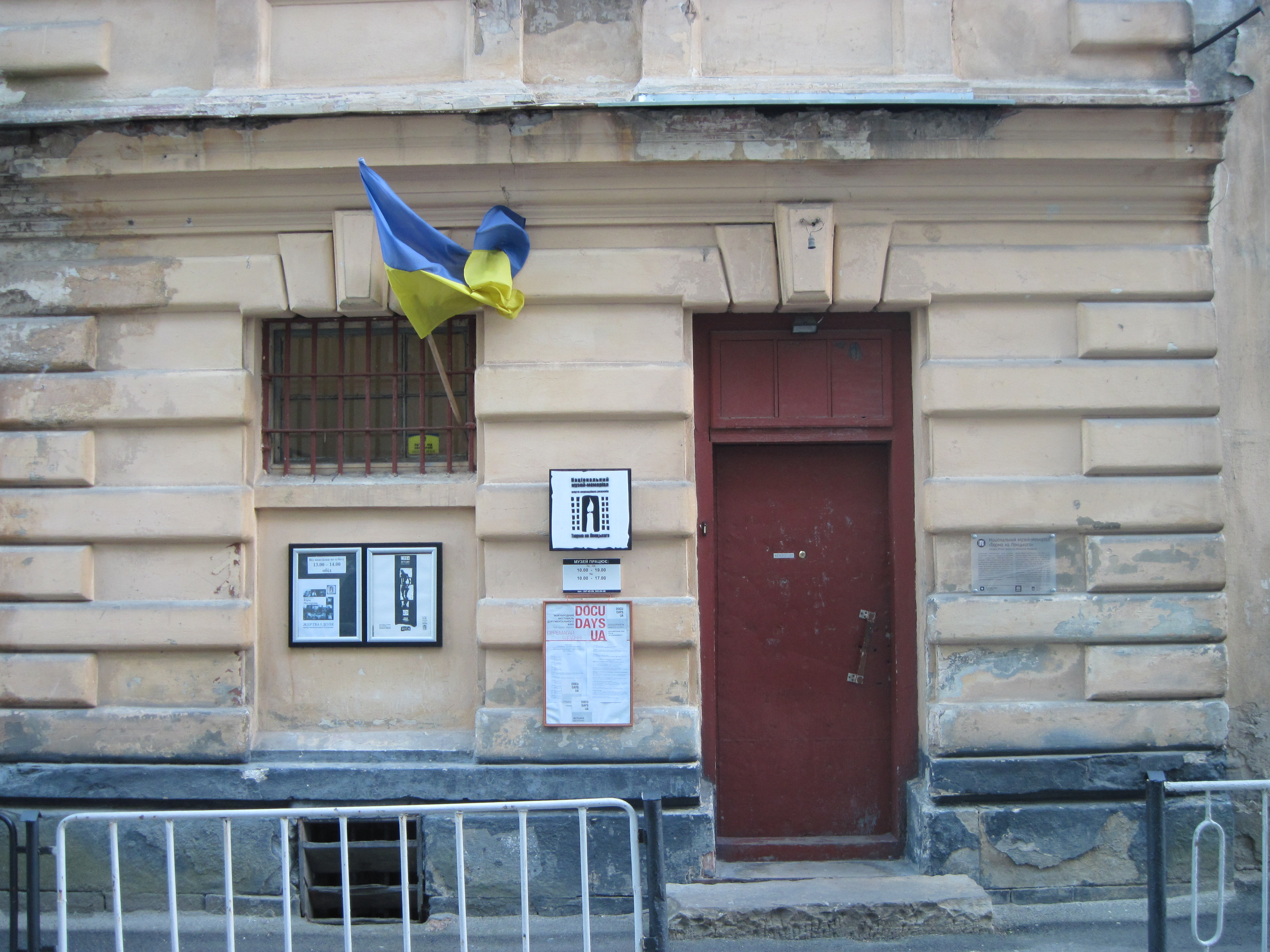
Entrance

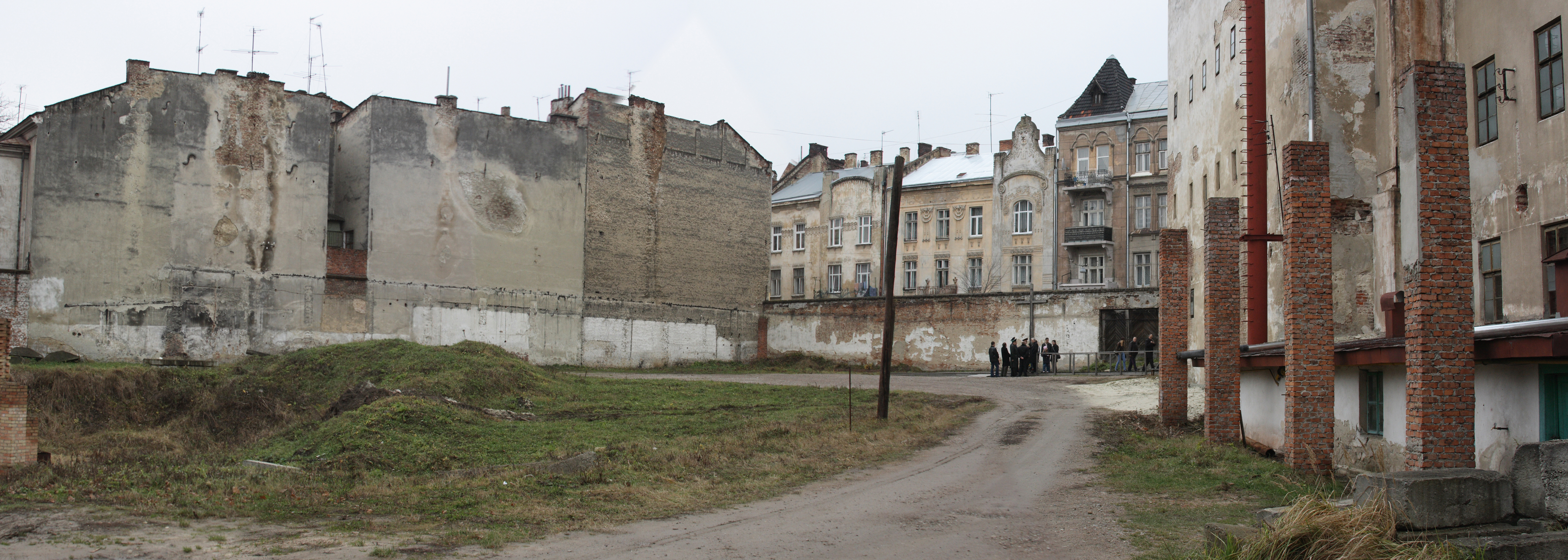
Courtyard

== See also ==
- House of Terror
- Brygidki
- Lviv pogroms (1941)
