= Brygidki =

Prison in Lviv, Ukraine

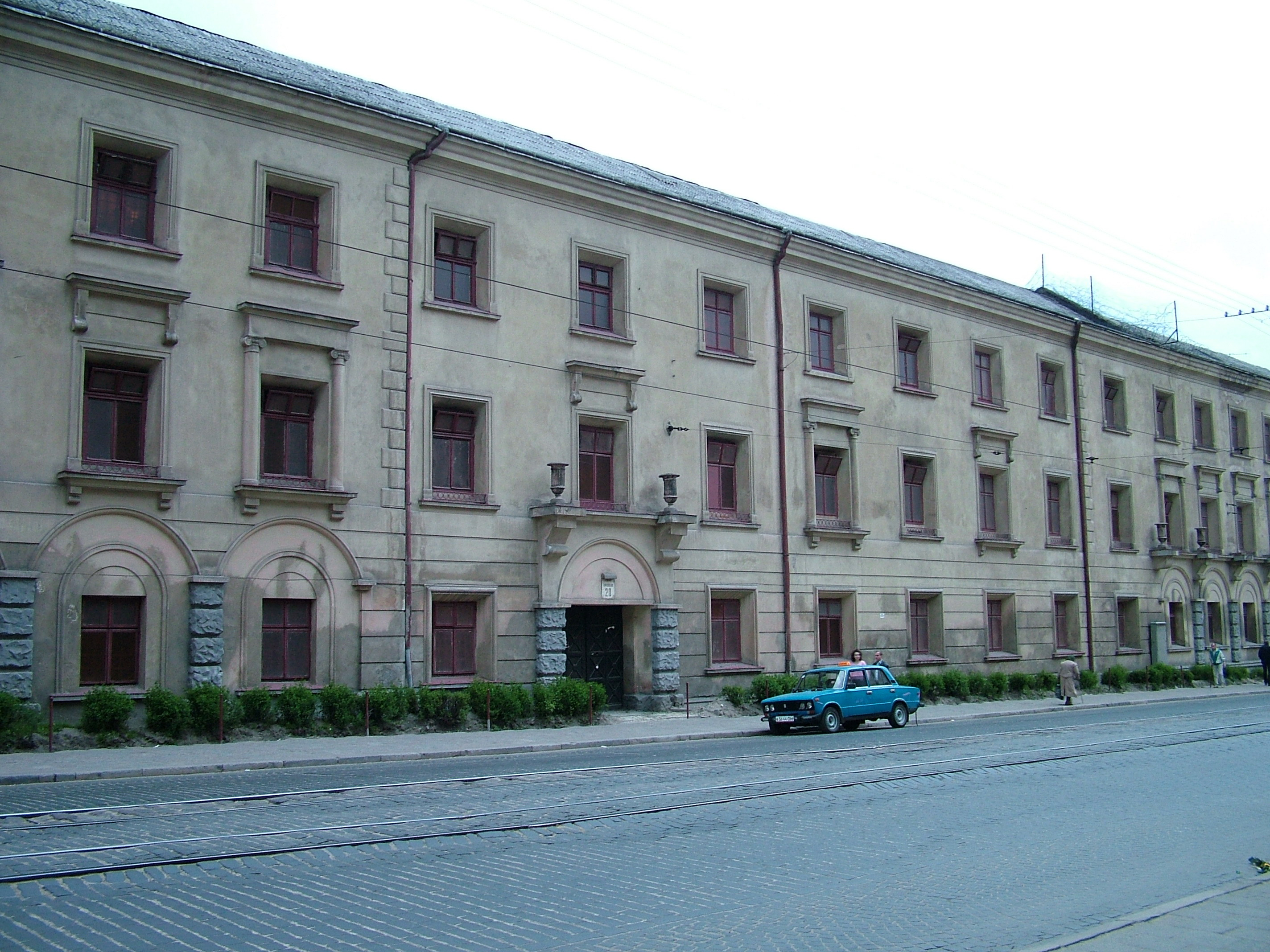
- The prison building still has the appearance of a Mannerist cloister
- Interactive map of Brygidki
- Location: Lviv, Ukraine; 49°50′36″N 24°1′19″E
- Status: operating
- Security class: male
- Opened: 1784

Brygidki (Ukrainian: Бригідки) is a prison in the building of a former Bridgettine nunnery in Lviv, Ukraine.

== History ==
The monastery was founded in 1614 at the behest of Anna Fastkowska and Anna Poradowska for girls from noble families. After the Partition of Poland the Austrian administration decided to secularise the convent. In 1784 the Brygidki building was turned into a prison, where death sentences would be carried out on a regular basis until the 1980s.

Taken over by the Soviet Union after Soviet invasion of Poland in 1939, the prison was one of three sites of mass murder of political prisoners by NKVD in Ukraine in June 1941 as the Soviets were retreating before the Nazi German invasion. Before this was complete, the NKVD left the prison to respond to the OUN uprising during the Battle of Lwów; some of the political prisoners took advantage of the lack of guards to escape, while others stayed in the prison, afraid the guards were waiting outside, and were instead massacred when the NKVD guards returned on June 25. However, while the political prisoners were massacred, the ordinary criminals imprisoned there were released by the NKVD. Approximately 7,000 prisoners - primarily Poles and Ukrainians - died in Lviv in that event.

During the German occupation, mass murders of Polish, Jewish and Ukrainian civilians occurred in Brygidki. It was the site of the murder of Prof. Kazimierz Bartel during the Massacre of Lwów professors.

The prison courtyard still contains a Baroque chapel from the former convent. There are plans to shut down the infamous prison or to move it out of the city.

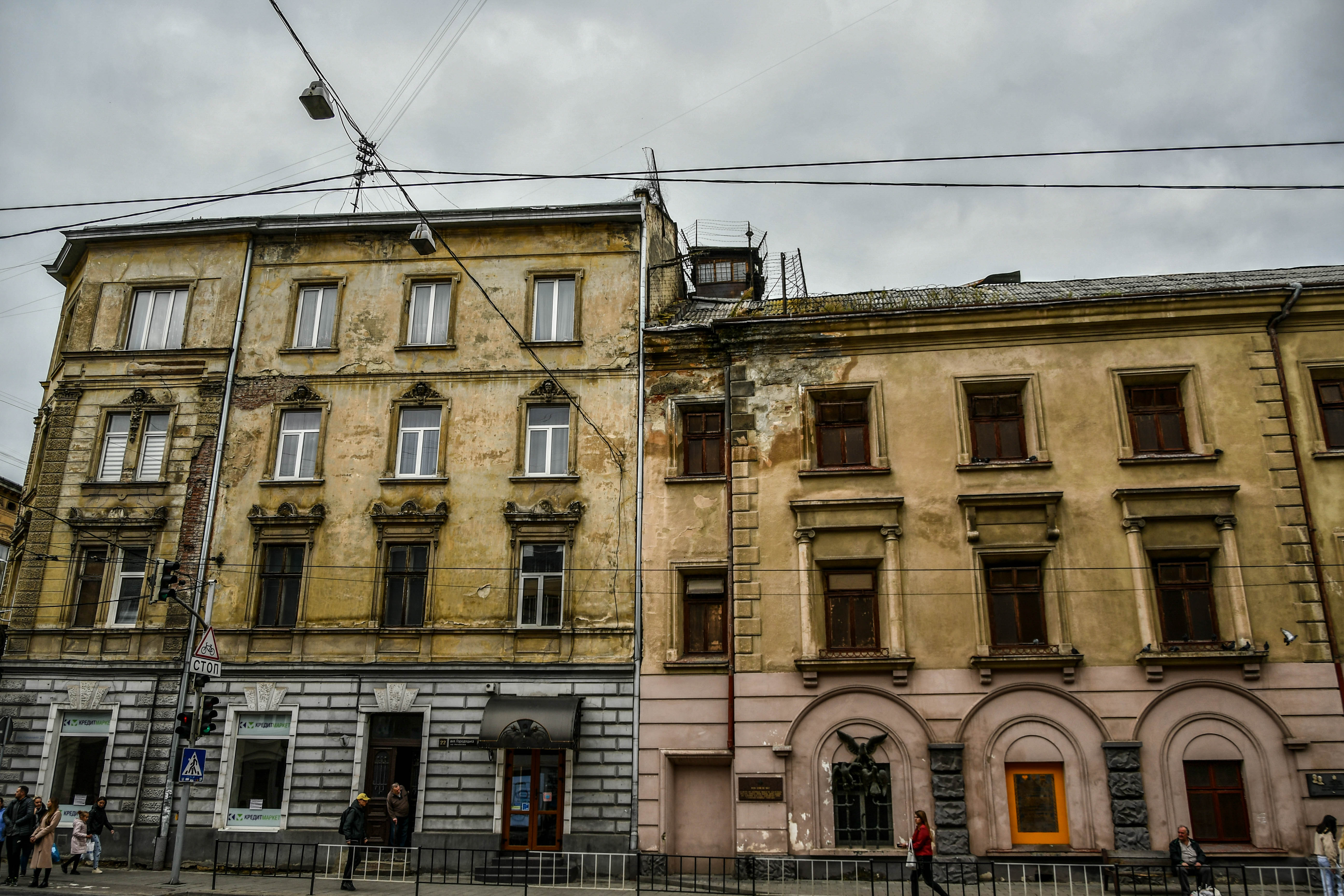

== Notable prisoners ==
- Omelian Pleshkewycz (1919)
- Naftali Botwin (1925) - executed by Polish authorities
- Kazimierz Bartel (1941) - murdered by Nazi German authorities
- Mykola Radeĭko - a leader of the Ukrainian Insurgent Army
