= Mykola Radeĭko =

Mykola Radeĭko

Mykola Radeĭko (October 2, 1920 — February 25, 2005) was an Ukraininan politician and physician. He was one of the leaders of the Ukrainian Insurgent Army in Lemko Region and a public figure of the Ukrainian diaspora in Norway.

== Biography ==
Mykola, son of Ostap Radeiko, was born on October 2, 1920 in Yavoriv. In 1937, he became a member of the Organization of Ukrainian Nationalists, for which he was expelled from the gymnasium "Native school." He was imprisoned in Przemyśl. As an external student, he passed exams at the gymnasium and entered Lviv University, from which he was also expelled because of his political beliefs. He was arrested again and was held in the Lviv prison on Zamarstynivskaya Street. Then he were transferred to Brygidki prison. In October 1942, he entered Lviv Medical University.

In the autumn of 1943, he left the school as a recruit of the Ukrainian Insurgent Army (UPA) in the Carpathians. In 1944, he was a district guide in the Syanitsky district (under the pseudonym "Khmel"). In 1946, he was appointed a district guide of the Organization of Ukrainian Nationalists (OUN) in the Lemko region (under the pseudonyms "Zorich" and "Crimea"). He directed the actions of the Ukrainian Liberation Movement. In 1947, after the decision of the underground command of the OUN and the main command of the UPA in Zakerzonia to dissolve the Ukrainian armed formations, he issued a corresponding order in the Lemko region. After that, he secretly went to Warsaw, then to Gdańsk, and then to Norway.

In 1953, he graduated from the University of Oslo, where he founded the Ukrainian society in Norway. He was a member of the Norwegian PEN club. He has repeatedly invited Ukrainian scientists and public figures, and actively covered Ukrainian topics in leading Norwegian publications. His contemporaries called him the ambassador of Ukraine to Norway. He actively united the community, and he collected relics and historical documents of the Ukrainian nation and state. For example, in 1978, in Hamburg, he bought a wagon of Hetman Ivan Mazepa from 1700.

The last time he was in Ukraine was in 1991. He went to Yavorov, and in Lviv he met with the chairman of the Lviv Oblast Council Viacheslav Chornovil.

He died on February 25, 2005 in Oslo and is buried in Oslo.

== Personal life ==
He was married to Norwegian Ragnhild Ramsland and had three children: Maria, Karl Roman and Bohdan.
