= Michael Chomiak =

Ukrainian lawyer, journalist, social activist (1905–1984)

- Михайло Хом'як
- Born: Mykhailo Khomiak; August 12, 1905; Stroniatyn, Austria-Hungary
- Died: April 16, 1984 (aged 78); Edmonton, Canada
- Education: Jan Kazimierz University; Academy of Foreign Trade in Lwów
- Occupations: Lawyer, journalist
- Relatives: Chrystia Freeland (granddaughter); John-Paul Himka (son-in-law)

Michael Chomiak (Ukrainian: Михайло Хом'як, romanized: Mykhailo Khomiak; August 12, 1905 – April 16, 1984) was a Ukrainian lawyer, journalist, and community activist who contributed to and edited several newspapers, including Dilo (lit. 'Deed'), the largest Western Ukrainian daily during the interwar period. From 1940 to 1945, he served as chief editor of Krakivs'ki Visti (lit. 'Kraków News'), the leading German-controlled and censored Ukrainian-language publication in the General Government, a role for which he has been described as a Nazi collaborator. Chomiak also authored a number of articles in the Encyclopedia of Ukraine.

== Biography ==
Khomiak was born in 1905 in the village of Stroniatyn in Eastern Galicia (then part of Austria-Hungary, now Western Ukraine). He graduated from a gymnasium in Lviv (under Polish rule at that time) in 1926, followed by a law degree from Jan Kazimierz University in 1930 and a year later a jurisprudence degree from the Academy of Foreign Trade. Until the outbreak of WWII, he worked as a lawyer in Bibrka (near Lviv) and Sianok. He also served as a courtroom correspondent (from 1928) and as an editorial staff member (1934–1939) for the Ukrainian-language newspaper Dilo (Ukrainian: Діло), as well as a contributor to the periodicals Meta (Ukrainian: Мета), Ridna Shkola (Ukrainian: Рідна школа), Vidrodzhennia (Ukrainian: Відродження), Nove selo (Ukrainian: Нове село) and Torhivlia i promysel (Ukrainian: Торгівля і промисел). He was not affiliated with any political party; instead, as a devout believer in Greek Catholicism, Mykhailo was an ardent supporter of Metropolitan Andrey Sheptytsky and the moderate Ukrainian patriotism he advocated.

After Western Ukraine was incorporated into the Ukrainian SSR following the Soviet invasion of Poland, he left Lviv and settled in Kraków, which, though then under German occupation, had become one of the centers for Ukrainian intellectuals. In late 1939, he received an apartment from the housing office that had previously belonged to Jewish residents and had been taken over by the city's trust office. The first apartment was on Kommandanturstraße (Stradomska Street); however, because of its close proximity to the city center and its later designation for German inhabitants, he was allocated a second apartment on Stanislaugasse (St. Stanislaus Street), near the Jewish quarter. In a letter to the district office, he reported having received oral permission from the previous occupant, the Jewish doctor Finkelstein, to take the furniture during the move, and noted that the former Jewish property “was so venomous and filthy, I was forced to refurbish and disinfect the whole apartment at my own expense,” requesting that the 190 zlotys he spent on these measures be either reimbursed or applied toward his rent. He concluded that a further disinfection was necessary.

Because of his political non-involvement, especially in the OUN, he was considered an eligible candidate in the eyes of the Germans as editor-in-chief of the Ukrainian-language newspaper Krakivs'ki Visti, which began publication in Kraków in January 1940. He became one in 1940 and held the position until 1945, when the newspaper was discontinued. His deputy was Lev Lepky, brother of the scholar Bohdan Lepky. According to Bohdan Osadchuk, who briefly worked as a correspondent for the outlet, he initially met Khomiak while seeking employment there and later remembered him as a “charming, cultured man.” In fact, the magazine itself was an organ of the Ukrainian Central Committee, which had a great deal of influence over the published content, primarily on the part of committee chairman Volodymyr Kubiyovych. The last one recalled Mykhailo's ability to engage both regular and freelance reporters from inside and outside the General Government for the daily and weekly editions, to organize press work in way that avoided Nazi censorship wherever possible, and to establish contacts with German officials for newspaper's goals.

Historian John-Paul Himka, his son-in-law, argues that Krakivs'ki Visti reflected a generalized nationalist standpoint and, although the newspaper was carefully censored by the German press bureau, it enjoyed more autonomy than other legal Ukrainian- and Polish-language outlets under Nazi rule, while also including anti-Jewish material, as evidenced by its coverage of the NKVD massacre in Vinnytsia. This last aspect, according to Himka, "contributed to create an atmosphere conducive to the mass murder of the Jews that was already underway," noting, however, that "most of the pogroms occurred before Krakivs'ki visti began writing about the NKVD and blaming them on the Jews" and "before it was even logistically possible to distribute the newspaper in the affected localities".

Khomiak changed his name to Michael Chomiak, adopting a more English-sounding version, when he emigrated to Canada after World War II. After his death in 1984 John-Paul Himka accessed his papers, which are now held in the Provincial Archives of Alberta.

== Freeland affair ==
Khomiak's granddaughter, Chrystia Freeland, was the Canadian Minister of Foreign Affairs when news about his wartime press work began circulating in 2017. Though Chomiak's connection to the collaborationist newspaper was known, the timing of the spread of that information in the media led to suggestions by Freeland herself that it was a politically driven campaign, orchestrated by Russian intelligence.

== Bibliography ==
- Markiewicz, Paweł (2018). The Ukrainian Central Committee, 1940-1945: A Case of Collaboration in Nazi-Occupied Poland (PDF). Kraków: Jagiellonian University.
