= Siege of Lwów (1672) =

- Part of Polish-Ottoman War (1672–1676)
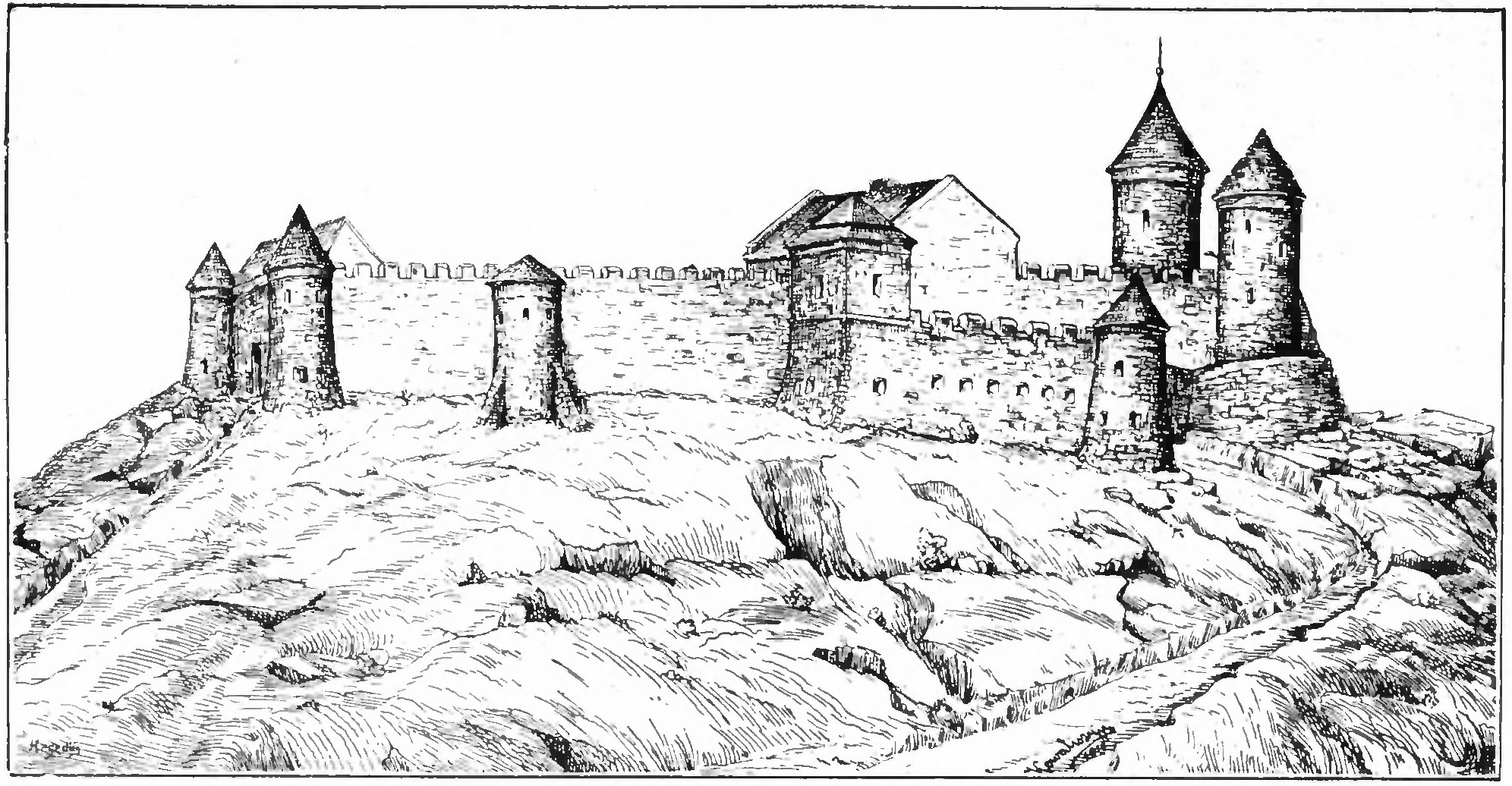
- High castle in Lviv
Date	September 20 – October 6, 1672
Location	Lviv, Polish-Lithuanian Commonwealth (Now Ukraine)
Result	See § Aftermath

Belligerents
Polish-Lithuanian Commonwealth	Ottoman Empire; Crimean Khanate; Cossack Hetmanate

Commanders and leaders
Eliasz Jan Łącki	Kaplan Pasha; Petro Doroshenko

Strength
500	50,000

Casualties and losses
Unknown	Unknown

The siege of Lwów took place on September 20-October 6, 1672 during the Polish-Ottoman War of 1672-1676. The siege ended in a strategic Polish victory as the Ottomans could not capture the city after a two-week siege.

== Background ==
After the fall of Kamieniec Podolski, the Turkish-Tatar-Cossack army advanced deep into Poland. The Tatars and some Cossack and Turkish troops took part in ravaging the country. Lviv was besieged on September 20 by the Cossack army of Petro Doroshenko and the Turkish army of Kaplan Pasha (a total of about 50,000 soldiers). The Lviv garrison of 500 soldiers (in addition to townspeople and peasants) was commanded by Elias Jan Łącki.

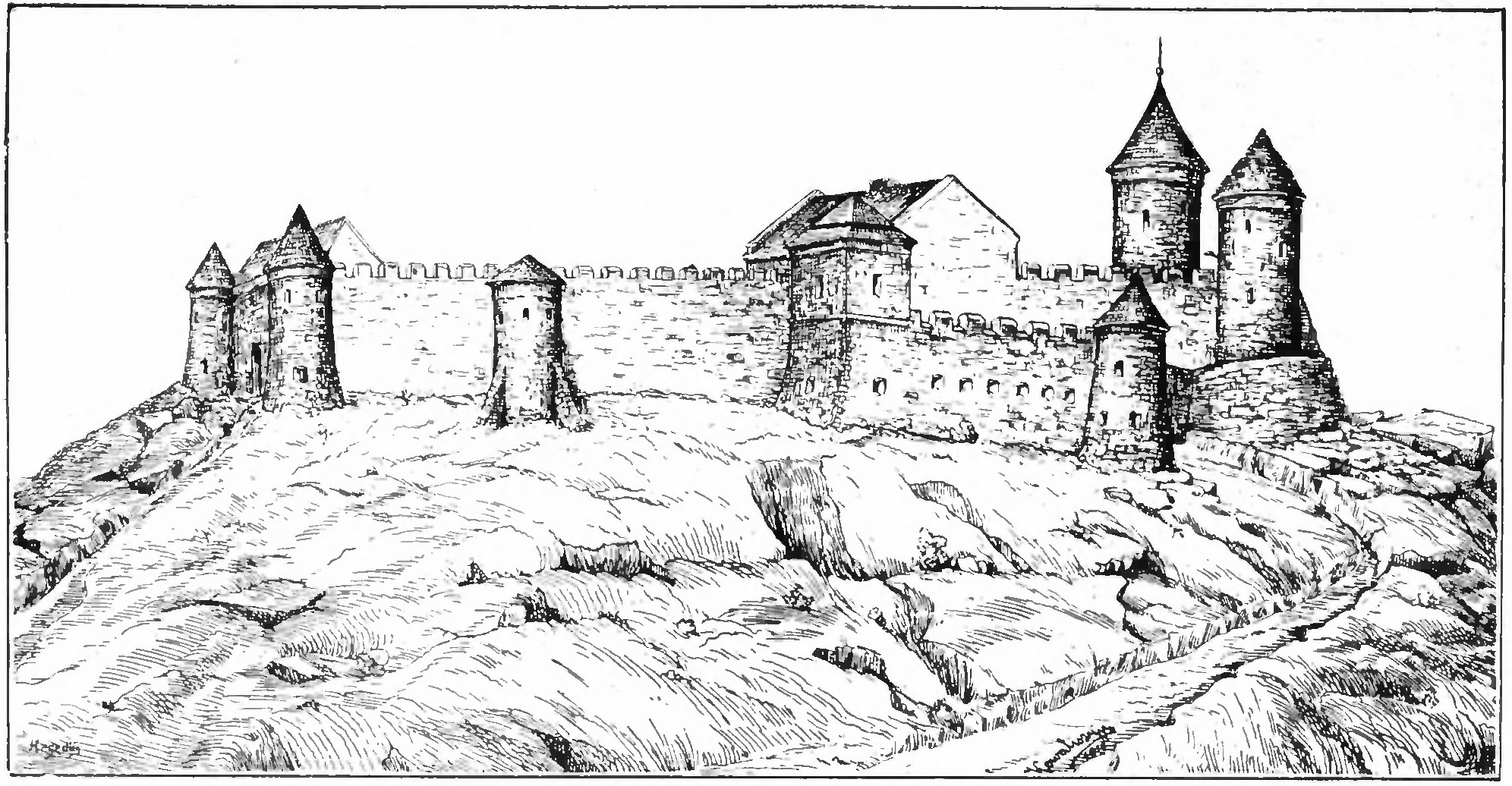
High castle in Lviv

== Siege ==
The Cossacks and Turks besieging Lviv immediately began shelling the city from cannons and conducting mine work, without giving up their assaults. After one of these, the High Castle fell on September 27, but the defenders recovered the loss the next day. Consistent artillery fire led to a significant breach in the fortress walls on September 29. Beginning on September 30, talks concluded with the October 6 treaty. The besieging troops, in exchange for a high ransom of 80 thousand thalers, agreed to give up the city.

Lwów could only pay the Turks 5,000 thalers at a time, so they took 10 hostages until the city repaid the entire amount. The 10 townsfolk returned to their homeland only after 7 years.

== Aftermath ==
After the siege was over, the Ottoman-Tatar-Cossack army returned to its main camp looting the Ruthenian Voivodeship along the way.
