= Krakivs'ki Visti =

Ukrainian newspaper headquartered in Vienna (1940–1945)

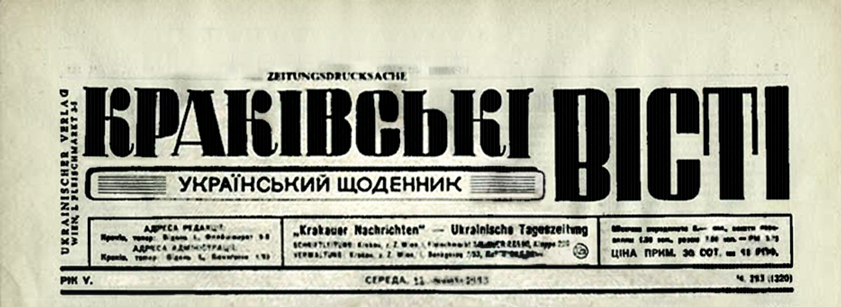
- Krakivs'ki Visti frontispiece
- Type: Daily newspaper
- Format: Tabloid
- Editor-in-chief: Michael Chomiak (a.k.a. Mykhailo Khomiak)
- Founded: 1940
- Ceased publication: 1945
- Political alignment: Nazi Party
- Language: Ukrainian
- Headquarters: General Government (later in Vienna)
- Circulation: 16,808 (1944)

The Krakivs'ki Visti (Ukrainian: Краківські вісті: народний часопис для Генерал-Губернаторства, German: Krakauer Nachrichten – Ukrainische Tageszeitung), was a Ukrainian newspaper based in Nazi-occupied Poland (and later Vienna) and published from 1940 to 1945. It was published in the Ukrainian language with German financial aid. Historians have described it as Nazi propaganda.

== Origins ==
After the Soviet invasion of Poland in 1939 in accordance with the Nazi-Soviet Pact, many Ukrainian nationalists left the Soviet-controlled Western Ukraine for the German zone of occupation, and became the centre of Ukrainian nationalists activity. Some of the most prominent Ukrainian writers contributed to Krakivs’ki visti. According to John-Paul Himka, a history professor at the University of Alberta, from 1940 until 1945, the newspaper was the "most important" in the Ukrainian language under the World War II German occupation. The newspaper's publisher, the Ukrainian Publishing House (UV) Ukrainske Vydavnytstvo, was established in December 1939 in Kraków, then the capital of the General Government or General Governorate administration of Nazi Germany. "Despite the financial and technical difficulties, strict German censorship, and paper shortages that plagued it throughout its existence", Ukrainian Publishing House published prolifically from 1940 to 1945. In a November 19, 1939 meeting with Ukrainian representatives, Governor-general Hans Frank "pledged his support for a Ukrainian publishing house and press."

The original funding came from the Ukrainian population of the General Governorate for the new limited company, Krakivs'ki Visti. The German head of the press department, Emil Gassner, gave Yevhen Yulii Pelensky, Ukrainske Vydavnytstvo's first director, the right to take over a printing press confiscated from the Jewish newspaper Nowy Dziennik.

The daily was closely associated with the Ukrainian Central Committee headed by Volodymyr Kubiyovych. It was more autonomous than other Ukrainian-language publication under the German rule.

== Distribution ==
The first issue of Krakivs'ki Visti was published on January 7, 1940. It began to publish daily in November 1940. At that time Ukrainske Vydavnytstvo began to publish a weekly paper for the rural population. The German occupiers limited newspapers to small press runs. The press run was just over 10,000 in 1941 and just over 15,000 in 1943.

The readership was located in the Governorate and among the Ukrainians "working as forced labor in Germany", and in German-occupied Europe. The Germans placed a ban on circulating the newspaper to the Reichskommissariat Ukraine (RKU), the civilian regime of much of Nazi German-occupied Ukraine, where "the bulk of the potential readership lived." The targeted audience envisioned by the newspapers founders were the "peasants, workers and refugees." In the end the daily was aimed at the intelligentsia and the weekly for the rural population and workers.

After the Soviet invasion of Poland in 1939 in accordance with the Nazi-Soviet Pact, many Ukrainian nationalists left the Soviet-controlled Kresy for the German zone of occupation, and Kraków became the centre of their nationalist activity. Some of the most prominent Ukrainian writers contributed to Krakivs’ki visti. However, there were very few Ukrainians living in Kraków, therefore most copies were distributed elsewhere.

== Content ==
Krakivs'ki visti, with headquarters in Kraków since 1940, republished materials from the German papers for distribution in the General Government territory of occupied Poland, especially the Nazi party organ Völkischer Beobachter, which appeared frequently. The articles were also translated from Berliner Illustrierte Nachtausgabe and all most important German papers. The Krakivs'ki Visti was distributed in Nazi Germany among the Ukrainian Ostarbeiter workers for the purpose of indoctrination especially after the anti-Soviet Operation Barbarossa of 1941, but also throughout other German-occupied countries. The company was moved to Vienna in 1944 ahead of the Soviet counteroffensive. The last issue was published on March 29, 1945.

== Editors ==
Ukrainske Vydavnytstvo's director Pelens'ki, had difficulty hiring a chief editor for the Krakivs'ki visti. Many talented editors from Lviv feared Soviet reprisals against their families who remained in Galicia.

The first editor, Borys Levyt'ski was fired on the insistence of the Germans, after he published an article on the Russo-Finnish War. Mykhailo Khomiak, who was in his thirties at the time, was appointed as editor-in-chief to replace Levyt'ski in 1940 and remained in that position until the paper closed in 1945. During that time, Ley Lepkyi was the deputy editor and Roman Kupchyns'kyi, Mariian Kozak, Iaroslav Zaremba, and Petro Sahaidachnyi, who were all Galacians, served on the editorial board.

Khomiak changed his name to Michael Chomiak when he emigrated to Canada after World War II. After his death in 1984, his son-in-law, John-Paul Himka, accessed his papers, which are now held in the Provincial Archives of Alberta. According to Himka, the anti-Jewish materials published in Krakiws'ki Visti contributed to the mass murder of Jews. Khomiak's granddaughter, Chrystia Freeland, was the Canadian Minister of Foreign Affairs when news about his work began circulating in 2017. Freeland's office initially denied the information, and Freeland herself dismissed it as Russian disinformation, though it was later reported that she had known about her grandfather's involvement with the paper for more than twenty years.

During the Second World War the Krakivs'ki Visti published official announcements, articles, and recruitment for the Waffen SS Galicia Division. In 2023 this division was given international publicity after a veteran of the division, Yaroslav Hunka, received recognition and standing ovations in the Canadian House of Commons in the presence of Chrystia Freeland, who was at the time deputy prime minister of Canada and the minister of finance.

== Relations with German authorities ==
The paper "was constantly running into difficulties with German censors", which did "damage to the paper" and created a "dangerous editorial crisis". In his correspondence with the publisher's office, Khomiak "placed blame" on the "lack of editorial presence in the newspaper", on German censorship.

=== Antisemitic articles (1943) ===
In May 1943, the German press chief, demanded that the newspaper publish a series of antisemitic articles in the "flagship of Ukrainian journalism under Nazi occupation," Krakov's daily newspaper, the Krakivs'ki Visti.

In 1984, following the death of Mykhailo Khomiak, then known as Michael Chomiak, his personal records revealed his role as editor-in-chief at Krakivski visti from 1940 through 1945 when he was in his thirties. He emigrated to Canada after WWII. Included in his records were detailed communications providing historical context of the articles. The records were acquired by the Provincial Archives of Alberta in 1985. Himka used these records as primary sources for papers he presented at Ukrainian-Jewish relations conferences in Kyiv in 1991 and Jerusalem in 1993. His 1996 article, "Krakivski visti and the Jews, 1943: A Contribution to the History of Ukrainian-Jewish Relations during the Second World War", published in the Journal of Ukrainian Studies, was a revised version of these papers. The records provided the names of the authors (now deceased) of the articles which were not included in the 1943 Krakivski visti articles: Kost Kuzyk, Luka Lutsiv, Olena Kysilevska, Oleksander Mystsiuk, and Oleksander Mokh who wrote a series of articles. Other Himka described the Krakivski visti as the "flagship of Ukrainian journalism under Nazi occupation," Krakov's daily newspaper, the Krakivs'ki Visti. The articles, which were published between May 25 through July, "provoked indignation on the part of the Ukrainian intelligentsia".
