= John-Paul Himka =

American-Canadian historian (born 1949)

- Іван-Павло Химка
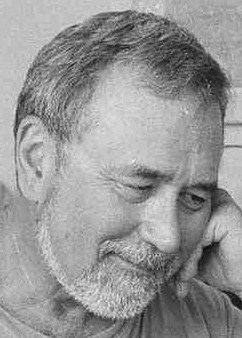
- Born: May 18, 1949 (age 77); Detroit, Michigan, U.S.
- Spouse: Chrystia Chomiak ()
- Children: 2

Academic background
- Education: University of Michigan BA (1971) Byzantine-Slavonic Studies; Ph.D. History
- Alma mater: University of Michigan
- Thesis: "Polish and Ukrainian Socialism: Austria, 1867–1890" (1977)

Academic work
- Discipline: History
- Institutions: University of Alberta
- Main interests: History of Eastern Europe, Ukraine

John-Paul Himka (Note: Ukrainian: Іван-Павло Химка, romanized: Ivan-Pavlo Khymka) (born May 18, 1949) is an American-Canadian historian and retired professor of history of the University of Alberta in Edmonton. Himka received his BA in Byzantine-Slavonic Studies and Ph.D. in History from the University of Michigan in 1971 and 1977 respectively. The title of his Ph.D. dissertation was Polish and Ukrainian Socialism: Austria, 1867–1890. As a historian, Himka was a Marxist in the 1970s–1980s but became influenced by postmodernism in the 1990s. In 2012, he defined his methodology in history as "eclectic".

== Life ==
Himka is of mixed ethnic background, Ukrainian (on father's side) and Italian (on mother's). Initially, he wanted to become a Greek Catholic priest and studied at St. Basil Seminary in Stamford, Connecticut. However, due to the radicalization of his political views to the left by the end of the 1960s he did not pursue that vocation.

== Career ==
Beginning in 1977, he taught at University of Alberta, Department of History and Classics. He became full Professor in 1992 and retired from the university in 2014. Himka is the recipient of several awards and fellowships, most notably the Rutherford Award for Excellence in Undergraduate Teaching in 2006, the Philip Lawson Award for Excellence in Teaching, and the J. Gordin Kaplan Award for Research Excellence. He served as co-editor of the Encyclopedia of Ukraine for three volumes devoted to history.

Himka, who traveled to Ukraine to conduct research since 1976, began to work with academics at Lviv University's Department of History. Initially Himka focused on Galicia's social history in the 19th and 20th centuries. The 1988 1000th anniversary of the Christianization of Rus' kindled his interest in the history of the Greek Catholic Church and the influence of the church on the development of Ukrainian nationalism. In 2002 he researched socialism in Habsburg Galicia, a formerly autonomous region in Western Ukraine, sacred culture of the Eastern Slavs (on iconography in particular) and the Holocaust in Ukraine. Since the late 1990s his contention with what he calls Ukrainian "nationalist historical myths" became subject of increasing, sometimes heated, debates both in Ukraine and Ukrainian Diaspora (especially in North America). Himka challenged the interpretation of Holodomor as a genocide and the view that Ukrainian nationalism and nationalists played no or almost no role in the Holocaust in Ukraine. He also opposed official glorification of such nationalistic heroes as Roman Shukhevych and Stepan Bandera in Ukraine during the presidency of Viktor Yushchenko.

The fundamental point of contention between the adherents of the national myth and me is whether or not the Organization of Ukrainian Nationalists (hereafter OUN) and its armed force, the Ukrainian Insurgent Army (hereafter UPA, from its Ukrainian initials) participated in the Holocaust. They deny this entirely. My research indicates, however, as does the research of scholars around the world, that the participation was significant.

— John-Paul Himka

In his 1996 article, Krakivski visti and the Jews, 1943: A Contribution to the History of Ukrainian-Jewish Relations during the Second World War, published in the Journal of Ukrainian Studies, based on earlier Ukrainian-language versions presented in 1991 in Kyiv and 1993 in Jerusalem at Ukrainian-Jewish relations conferences, Himka wrote that the history of Ukrainian-Jewish relations during WWII remained surprisingly underinvestigated. Himka cited Raul Hilberg's "monumental study", The Destruction of the European Jews as the source used by historians. In response to this lacuna, Himka presented his detailed study of the publishing of a series of antisemitic articles in 1943 in the "flagship of Ukrainian journalism under Nazi occupation," Krakov's daily newspaper Krakivs'ki Visti. The primary sources for his study included the articles as well as the records of the Krakivs'ki Visti maintained by Ukrainian-Canadian Michael Chomiak, who was born in Ukraine in the 1910s as Mykhailo Khomiak and changed his name to Michael Chomiak when he emigrated to Canada at the end of WWII. The Provincial Archives of Alberta acquired Chomiak's records in 1985 following Chomiak's death. He was the chief editor of Krakivs'ki Visti from 1940 to 1945. Himka is his son-in-law. Himka described how Krakivs'ki Visti "played an important and, generally, positive role in Ukrainian life," "serving as a buffer between the German occupation authorities and the population of the Generalgouvernement." In response to a May 1943 order by the German press chief, the newspaper published antisemitic articles from May 25 through July which were received negatively by the Ukrainian intelligentsia in general.

Himka completed a series of three major studies on the history of Ukrainian Galicia in the 19th century. The first, Socialism in Galicia: the emergence of Polish social democracy and Ukrainian radicalism (1860–1890) was published in 1983. The second, Galician Villagers and the Ukrainian National Movement in the Nineteenth Century was published in 1988. The third, Religion and Nationality in Western Ukraine: The Greek Catholic Church and the Ruthenian National Movement in Galicia, 1867–1900, which is "devoted to the interrelations between church and state", was published in 1999. In a book review in the Harvard Ukrainian Studies, Larry Wolff described Religion and Nationality in Western Ukraine as a subtle, sophisticated and insightful account of an "important and profoundly complex historical problem." Wolff writes that Himka's research "makes the case for a contingent and evolutionary perspective on nationality in which several different forms and inflections of national identity jostle one another in cultural competition, enhanced or diminished by various historical forces, including religion, without any predetermined outcome." Himka, "engaged with the all-important issue of national identity, makes a brilliant contribution, not just to the history of Ukrainian nationality, but also to the general theoretical understanding of modern nationalism." Himka employs "concepts of nationality and nationalism developed by Ernest Gellner, E.J. Hobsbawm, and Miroslav Hroch. Himka observed that the "Greek Catholic case in Galicia" is "a stunningly transparent instance of how much agency and choice can be involved in the construction of nationality."

In his 2005 article, War Criminality: A Blank Spot in the Collective Memory of the Ukrainian Diaspora War Criminality he examined material that emerged from an important Ukrainian-Jewish relations conference held in 1983, that happened to be held on the 50th anniversary of the Soviet famine of 1932–33. as well as "current electronic media and recent years of The Ukrainian Weekly, supplemented with a retrospective sampling of articles from Svoboda." At the 1983 conference, Professor Yaroslav Bilinsky denied "a causal connection between alleged collaboration of Jewish-born Communists in the collectivization of agriculture and the Great Famine and any proven collaboration of Ukrainian-born extremists in the Holocaust."'

His 2009 book, Last Judgment Iconography in the Carpathians, was the result of ten years of research "throughout the region of the Carpathian Mountains, where he "found a distinctive and transnational blending of Gothic, Byzantine, and Novgorodian art."

In his chapter Ethnicity and the Reporting of Mass Murder: Krakivs′ki visti, the NKVD Murders of 1941, and the Vinnytsia Exhumation, Himka examined how the Krakivs'ki Visti, an "important [Ukrainian] nationalist newspaper" "reported on two cases of mass violence by the Soviets, the 1941 NKVD prisoner massacres and the 1943 Vinnytsia massacre. Himka wrote that Krakivs'ki Visti "ethnicized both perpetrators and victims, ascribing primarily Jewish identity to the former and depicting the latter as almost exclusively Ukrainian."

== Personal life ==
John-Paul Himka is married to Chrystia Chomiak, the daughter of Michael Chomiak (1905 – 1984), who was an editor of the Ukrainian antisemitic newspaper Krakivs'ki Visti. Himka learned of this only after Chomiak died in 1984. He is also the uncle of former Deputy Prime Minister of Canada Chrystia Freeland. Himka and Chomiak have two children.

== Awards ==
He was awarded the 2001-2002 Killam Annual Professorship

- Antonovych prize (1988)
- Rutherford Award for Excellence in Undergraduate Teaching (2006)
- Philip Lawson Award for Excellence in Teaching
- J. Gordin Kaplan Award for Research Excellence

== Bibliography ==
=== Books ===
- Socialism in Galicia: The Emergence of Polish Social Democracy and Ukrainian Radicalism (1860–1890) (1983)
- With Frances A. Swyripa: Sources for Researching Ukrainian Family History. In: Research Papers. Issue 6. Canadian Institute of Ukrainian Studies, Edmonton 1984
- Galician Villagers and the Ukrainian National Movement in the Nineteenth Century, Palgrave Macmillan (1988) (academia.edu)
- Religion and Nationality in Western Ukraine: The Greek Catholic Church and the Ruthenian National Movement in Galicia, 1867–1900 (1999)
- Last Judgment Iconography in the Carpathians (2009)
- Ukrainians, Jews and the Holocaust: Divergent Memories. Saskatoon: Heritage Press. 2009. ISBN 978-0-88880-554-6.
- Ukrainian Nationalists and the Holocaust: OUN and UPA's Participation in the Destruction of Ukrainian Jewry, 1941–1944. Stuttgart: ibidem. 2021. ISBN 978-3-8382-1548-8.

=== Edited, co-edited and translated volumes ===
- (Assistant editor.) Rethinking Ukrainian History (1981)
- Rosdolsky, Roman (1986). Engels and the "Nonhistoric" Peoples: The National Question in the Revolution of 1848. Translated by Himka, John-Paul. Glasgow: Critique Books. ISBN 9781870111010.
- Galicia and Bukovina: A Research Handbook about Western Ukraine, Late 19th and 20th Centuries (1990) (diaspora.org.ua)
- Co-editor (with Hans-Joachim Torke). German-Ukrainian Relations in Historical Perspective (1994)
- Co-editor (with Andriy Zayarnyuk). Letters from Heaven: Popular Religion in Russia and Ukraine (2006)
- Co-editor (with Joanna Beata Michlic). Bringing the Dark Past to Light: The Reception of the Holocaust in Post-Communist Europe (2013)
- Co-editor (with Franz A. J. Szabo): Eastern Christians in the Habsburg Monarchy. University of Alberta Press, (2022). ISBN 1-894865-64-2. doi:10.1017/S0067237823000255

=== Articles ===
- Himka, John-Paul (2026). "Jews in the Agricultural Economy in Galicia and Bukovina, 1772-1945". In Shifriss, Nathan; Judith, Kalik; Cooper, Levi (eds.). Historical Atlas of Jewish Galicia and Bukovina. Jerusalem: Jewish Galicia and Bukovina Organization, National Library of Israel.
- Himka, John-Paul (2026). "The Surrounding Society in the Presence of the Extermination of the Jews of Galicia and Bukovina". In Shifriss, Nathan; Judith, Kalik; Cooper, Levi (eds.). Historical Atlas of Jewish Galicia and Bukovina. Jerusalem: Jewish Galicia and Bukovina Organization, National Library of Israel.
- "War, Memory Politics, and Ukrainian Nationalism". Passato e Presente (121): 19–25. 2024.
- Weitzman, Mark, ed. (2024), "Antisemitism in Ukraine", Routledge History of Antisemitism, London: Routledge, pp. 236–244
- "Radical Ukrainian Nationalism: Past and Present". 2023. doi:10.1007/978-3-319-66523-8_4.
- "A Slaughter of Jews in Ukraine. Who perpetrated the Lviv pogrom of July 1941?". Tablet. 2023-07-06.
- with Wróbel, Piotr J.; Markiewicz, Paweł; Carynnyk, Marco; Krapfl, James (2023). "A Roundtable on John-Paul Himka's Ukrainian Nationalists and the Holocaust: OUN and UPA's Participation in the Destruction of Ukrainian Jewry, 1941-1944". Canadian Slavonic Papers. 56 (3–4): 453–467. doi:10.1080/00085006.2023.2270348.
- "OUN and Fascism, Definitions and Blood". Journal of Soviet and Post-Soviet Politics and Society. 7 (2): 166–175. 2021.
- "A Critical History of Ukrainian-Ukrainian Relations". Nationalities Papers. 48 (6): 1097–1099. 2020. doi:10.1017/nps.2020.70.
- Lower, Wendy; Faulkner Rossi, Lauren, eds. (2017). "Former Ukrainian Policemen in the Ukrainian National Insurgency: Continuing the Holocaust outside German Service". Lessons and Legacies XII: New Directions in Holocaust Research and Education. Evanstone: Northwestern University Press. pp. 141–163. ISBN 978-0-8101-3448-5.
- "The History behind the Regional Conflict in Ukraine". Kritika: Explorations in Russian and Eurasian History. 16 (1): 129–136. 2015. doi:10.1353/kri.2015.0008.
- "Review: Eric C. Steinhart. The Holocaust and the Germanization of Ukraine" (PDF). Ukraina Moderna. 24. 2015.
- Legislating Historical Truth: Ukraine's Laws of 9 April 2015, 2015
- "Ethnicity and the Reporting of Mass Murder: 'Krakivs'ki visti', the NKVD Murders of 1941, and the Vinnytsia Exhumation". Chapter: Ethnicizing the Perpetrators. University of Alberta. 2014. Archived from the original on 2 April 2015.
- "Metropolitan Andrey Sheptytsky and the Holocaust". Polin: Studies in Polish Jewry. 26: 337–359. 2014. doi:10.3828/polin.2014.26.337. ISSN 0268-1056.
- Himka, John-Paul; Michlic, Joanna Beata, eds. (2013). "The Reception of the Holocaust in Postcommunist Ukraine". Bringing the Dark Past to Light: The Reception of the Holocaust in Post-Communist Europe. Lincoln: University of Nebraska Press. pp. 626–661. ISBN 978-0-8032-2544-2.
- "Encumbered Memory: The Ukrainian Famine of 1932-33". Kritika: Explorations in Russian and Eurasian History. 14 (2): 411–436. 2013. doi:10.1353/kri.2013.0025.
- Miller, Alexei; Lipman, Maria, eds. (2012). "Interventions: Challenging the Myths of Twentieth-Century Ukrainian History". The Convolutions of Historical Politics. Central European University Press: Central European University Press. pp. 211–238. doi:10.1515/9786155225468. ISBN 978-615-5225-46-8.
- Wanner, Catherine, ed. (2012). "Christianity and Radical Nationalism: Metropolitan Andrei Sheptytsky and the Bandera Movement". State Secularism and Lived Religion in Soviet Russia and Ukraine. oodrow Wilson Center Press with Oxford University. ISBN 9780199937639.
- "The Lviv Pogrom of 1941: The Germans, Ukrainian Nationalists, and the Carnival Crowd". Canadian Slavonic Papers. 53 (2–4): 209–243. 2011. doi:10.1080/00085006.2011.1109267 (inactive 26 July 2026).
- "Debates in Ukraine over Nationalist Involvement in the Holocaust, 2004-2008". Nationalities Papers. 39 (3): 353–370. 2011. doi:10.1080/00905992.2011.565315.
- Collaboration and or Resistance: The OUN and UPA during the War. Paper prepared for the Ukrainian Jewish Encounter Shared Narrative Series: Conference on Issues Relating to World War II, Potsdam, 27-30 June 2011, 2011
- Interventions: Challenging the Myths of Twentieth-Century Ukrainian History (PDF), 2011, archived from the original (PDF) on 23 April 2013
- "The Organization of Ukrainian Nationalists and the Ukrainian Insurgent Army: Unwelcome Elements of an Identity Project". Ab Imperio. 2010 (4): 83–101. 2010. doi:10.1353/imp.2010.0101.
- Kasianov, Georgiy; Ther, Philipp, eds. (2008). "Victim Cinema: Between Hitler and Stalin: Ukraine in World War II -- The Untold Story". A Laboratory of Transnational History. Budapest: Central European University Press. pp. 211–224. doi:10.1515/9786155211553-010. ISBN 978-6-15521155-3.
- "A Central European Diaspora under the Shadow of World War II: The Galician Ukrainians in North America". Austrian History Yearbook. 37: 17–31. 2006. doi:10.1017/S0067237800016738.
- "War Criminality: A Blank Spot in the Collective Memory of the Ukrainian Diaspora". Spaces of Identity. 5 (1). 2005.
- "Episodes in the Historiography of the Ukrainian Icon". Journal of Ukrainian Studies. 29 (1): 149–167. 2004.
- "The Greek Catholic Church in Galicia, 1848-1914" (PDF). Harvard Ukrainian Studies. 26 (1/4): 245–260. 2002. JSTOR 41036853.
- "The Ukrainian Idea in the Second Half of the 19th Century". Kritika: Explorations in Russian and Eurasian History. 3 (2): 321–335. 2002. doi:10.1353/kri.2002.0021.
- "The Lay and Clerical Intelligentsia in Greek-Catholic Galicia, 1900-1939: Competition, Conflict, Cooperation". Harvard Ukrainian Studies. 26 (1–4): 245–260. 2002. JSTOR 41036854.
- Suny, Ronald Grigor; Kenned, Michael D., eds. (2001). "The Construction of Nationality in Galician Rus: Icarian Flights in Almost All Directions" (PDF). Intellectuals and the Articulation of the Nation. Ann Arbor: University of Michigan Press. pp. 109–164. ISBN 978-0-472-08828-7.
- "Dimensions of a Triangle: Polish–Ukrainian–Jewish Relations in Austrian Galicia". Polin: Studies in Polish Jewry. 12: 25–48. 1999. doi:10.3828/polin.1999.12.25.
- "The Transformation and Formation of Social Strata and Their Place in the Ukrainian NationalJournal of Ukrainian Studies". Movement in Nineteenth-Century Galicia. In. 23 (2): 3–23. 1998.
- "Ukrainian Collaboration in the Extermination of the Jews During the Second World War: Sorting Out the Long-Term and Conjunctural Factors" (PDF), Studies in Contemporary Jewry, vol. 13, pp. 170–189, 1997
- "Krakivski visti and the Jews, 1943: A Contribution to the History of Ukrainian-Jewish Relations during the Second World War". Journal of Ukrainian Studies. 21 (1–2): 81–95. 1996.
- "Provisional Government", Encyclopedia of Ukraine, 1993
- "Western Ukraine between the Wars". Canadian Slavonic Papers. 34 (4): 391–412. 1992. doi:10.1080/00085006.1992.11092000.
- Himka, John-Paul (1990). "Ukrainian-Jewish Antagonism in the Galician Countryside During the Late Nineteenth Century". In Aster, Howard; Potichnyj, Peter J. (eds.). Ukrainian-Jewish Relations in Historical Perspective. Edmonton: Canadian Institute of Ukrainian Studies Press. pp. 111–158.
- "Украиинськии Сотсииализм у Халйцхйни. (До розколу в Радйкальнии Партии 1899 р.). Ukrainian Socialism in Halychyna. (Until the split in the Radical Party in 1899)". Journal of Ukrainian Graduate Studies (in Ukrainian). 4 (2): 33–51. 1988.
- "Serfdom in Galicia". Journal of Ukrainian Studies. 9 (2): 3–26. 1984.
- "The Greek Catholic Church and Nation-Building in Galicia, 1772-1918". Harvard Ukrainian Studies. 8 (3–4): 426–452. 1984. JSTOR 41036205.
- "Young Radicals and Independent Statehood: The Idea of a Ukrainian Nation-State, 1890-1895". Slavic Review. 41 (2): 219–235. 1982. doi:10.2307/2496340. JSTOR 2496340.
- Himka, John-Paul (1982). "The Background to Emigration: Ukrainians of Galicia and Bukovyna, 1848-1914". In Manoly, R. Lupul (ed.). A Heritage in Transition. Essays in the History of Ukrainians in Canada (PDF). Toronto: McClelland and Stewart. ISBN 0-7710-5388-6.
- "Leonid Plyushch: The Ukrainian Marxist Resurgent". Journal of Ukrainian Studies. 5 (2): 61–79. 1980.
- "Priests and Peasants: The Greek Catholic Pastor and the Ukrainian National Movement in Austria, 1867-1900". Canadian Slavonic Papers. 21 (1): 1–14. 1979. doi:10.1080/00085006.1979.11091564. JSTOR 40867412.

=== Videos ===
- Who Whom? Problems in Identifying Perpetrators and Victims in Ukraine on the Eve of and During the Second World War (Lecture), Lviv: Center for Urban History, 2017-10-19
