= Gaj massacre =

Massacre of Polish village

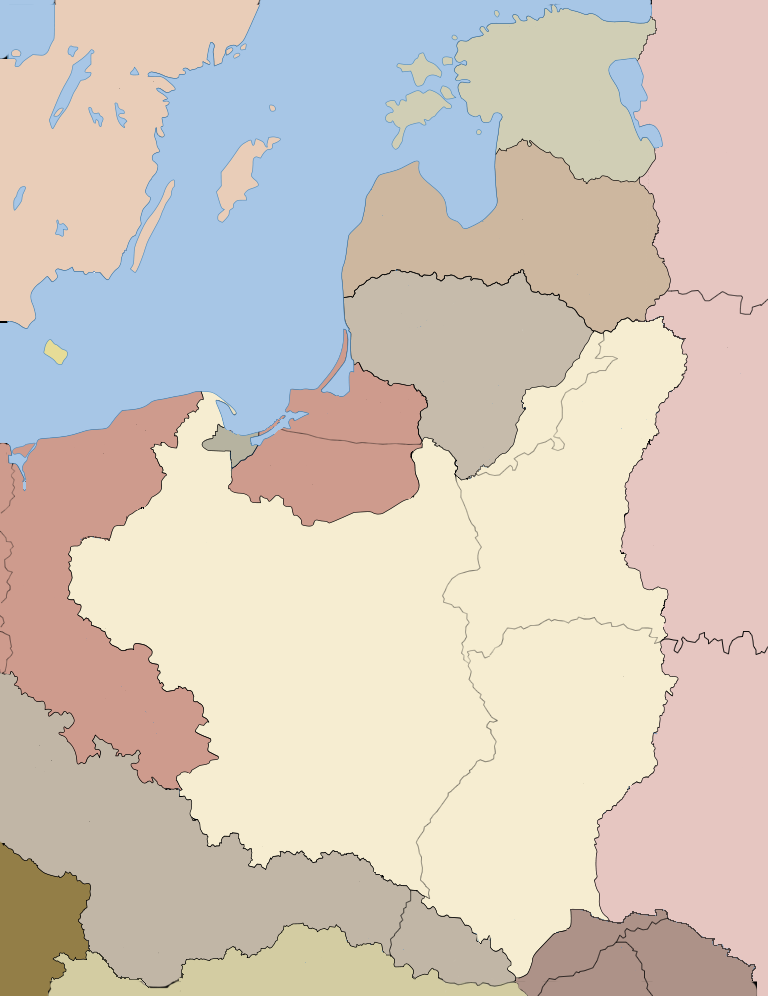
- Location of the Massacre (map of the Second Polish Republic from before the German-Soviet invasion of 1939)
- Location: 51°8′15″N 25°17′55″E; Gaj, Volhynian Voivodeship, occupied Poland
- Date: 30 August 1943
- Target: Poles
- Attack type: Shooting and stabbing
- Weapons: Rifles, axes, pitchforks, bludgeons
- Deaths: 250
- Perpetrator: Ukrainian Insurgent Army
- Motive: Anti-Catholicism, Anti-Polish sentiment, Greater Ukraine, Ukrainisation

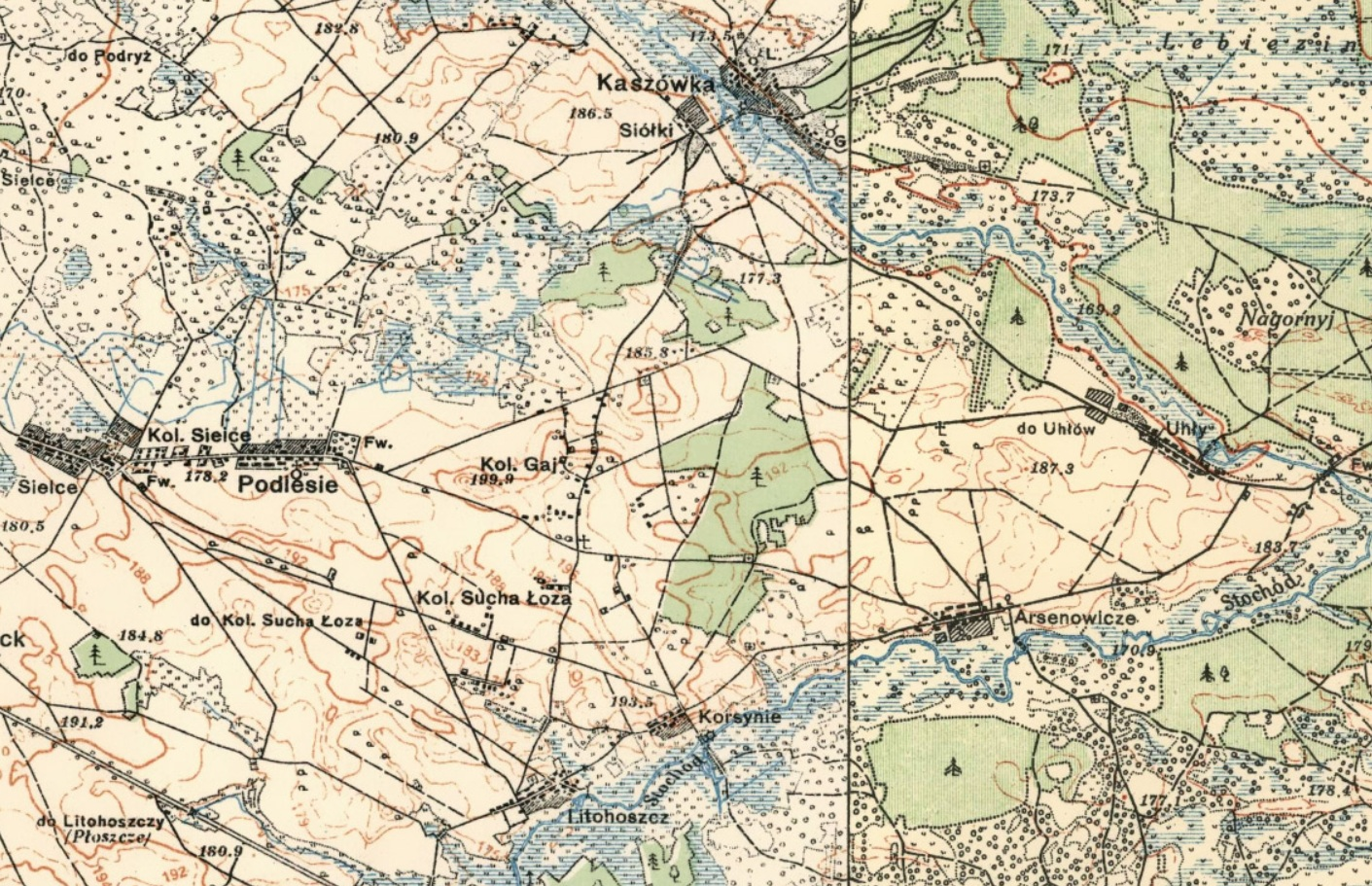
1926 Polish map showing the location of the former settlement Kolonia Gaj (Kol. Gaj) in Volhynia. The map is uploaded for historical and geographical identification of the settlement, which ceased to exist during World War II massacres.

Gaj massacre was a massacre of the Polish population of Gaj, committed on 30 August 1943 by the Ukrainian Insurgent Army death squad aided by the Ukrainian peasants, in which 600 civilian Poles were killed, including a large number of children. The mass murder operation in Gaj was carried out during the province-wide Massacres of Poles in Volhynia and Eastern Galicia. The (exclusively Polish) settlement (consisting of Nowy and Stary Gaj) founded in the 1920s was burned to the ground by OUN-UPA and no longer exists. When the Polish self-defence unit from nearby Rożyszcze arrived at the Gaj colony a few days later the bodies of victims were strewn everywhere. They identified and shot several Ukrainian collaborators and set their houses on fire in retaliation. The Gaj colony was located in the Kowel County (powiat kowelski) of the Wołyń Voivodeship in the Second Polish Republic (now, part of the Kovel Raion, south-east of Kovel, Ukraine).

== Account of the massacre ==
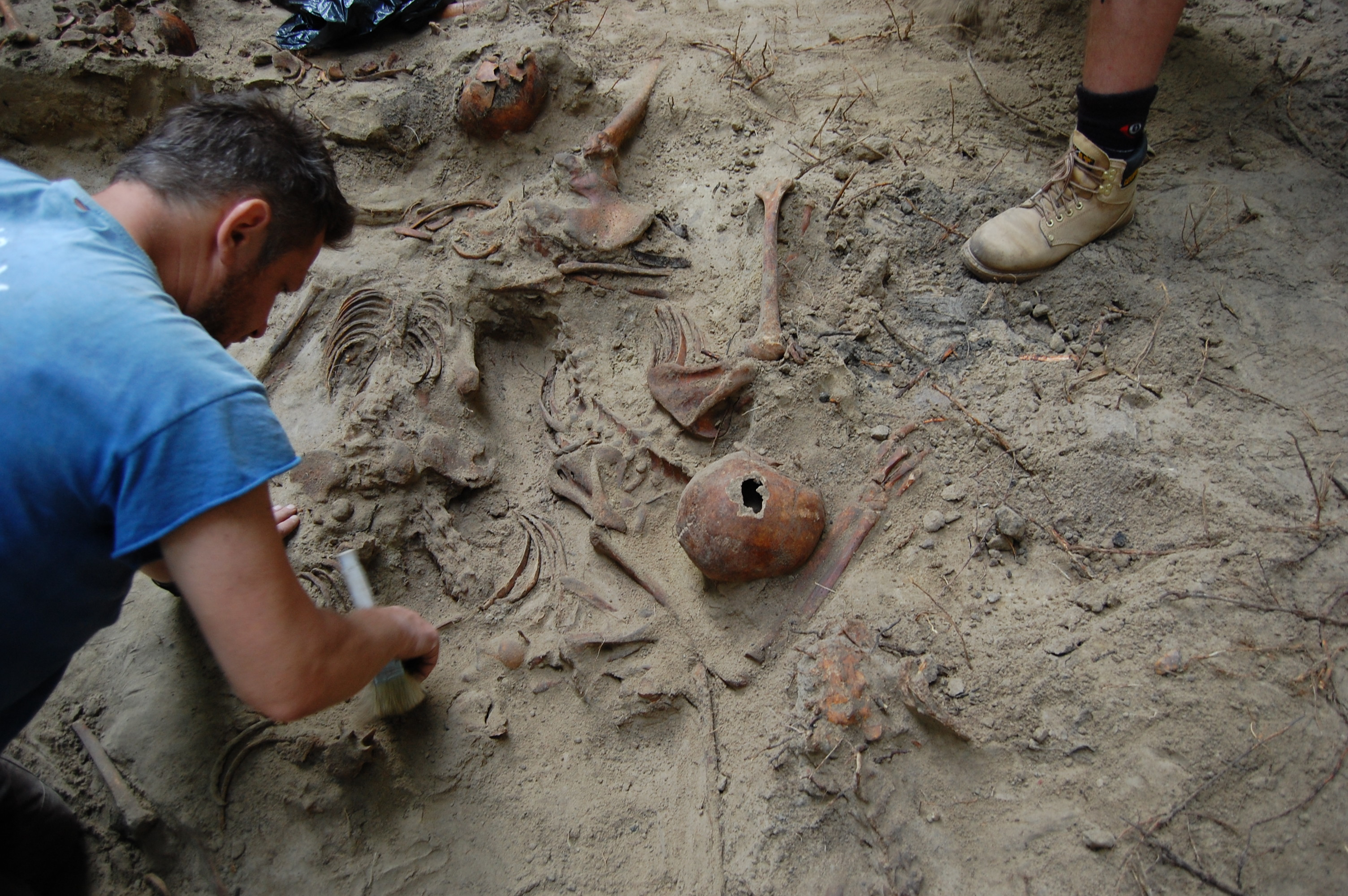
Exhumation of the OUN-UPA victims in Gaj, 2013

One day before the massacre, on 29 August 1943, the same UPA unit led by Telemon Majdaniec murdered 40 Poles in the Polish town of Mielnica, and in the night relocated to the Ukrainian village of Janówka where a large group of peasants was assembled for the raid on Gaj. They entered the colony at dawn, when many Poles were still sleeping.

The Ukrainian sotnia led by "Wowka" (Wolf) rounded up the Poles and escorted them to the school building. Many Poles were killed directly on their farms and along the road, or in the bushes while trying to escape. Most victims were murdered in the school building, with automatic weapons and farm tools; their bodies thrown into the adjacent ditch. About 600 Poles (200 identified by name) were killed in total, and 150 farms were robbed and scorched afterwards, along with the Catholic church. A few days after the massacre, the Polish self-defence unit arrived at the Gaj colony from nearby Rożyszcze. The Poles were shocked by what they saw. The ditches and cellars were filled with dead bodies. In their vicinity lied the murder weapons: axes, pitchforks, hoes, saws and bars covered in blood. The self-defence identified and executed several Ukrainian collaborators and burned several Ukrainian houses. They then evacuated the few surviving Poles to Rożyszcze. In 2013 a group of archaeologists discovered one of the mass graves in the no longer existing village. They found the remains of 80 people, most of them were children. Other mass graves have already been destroyed in postwar years including during the construction of the local landfill.

== See also ==
- Budy Ossowskie massacre also in powiat kowelski
- Polish population transfers in 1944–1946
- Soviet repressions of Polish citizens (1939–1946)
