= Dominopol massacre =

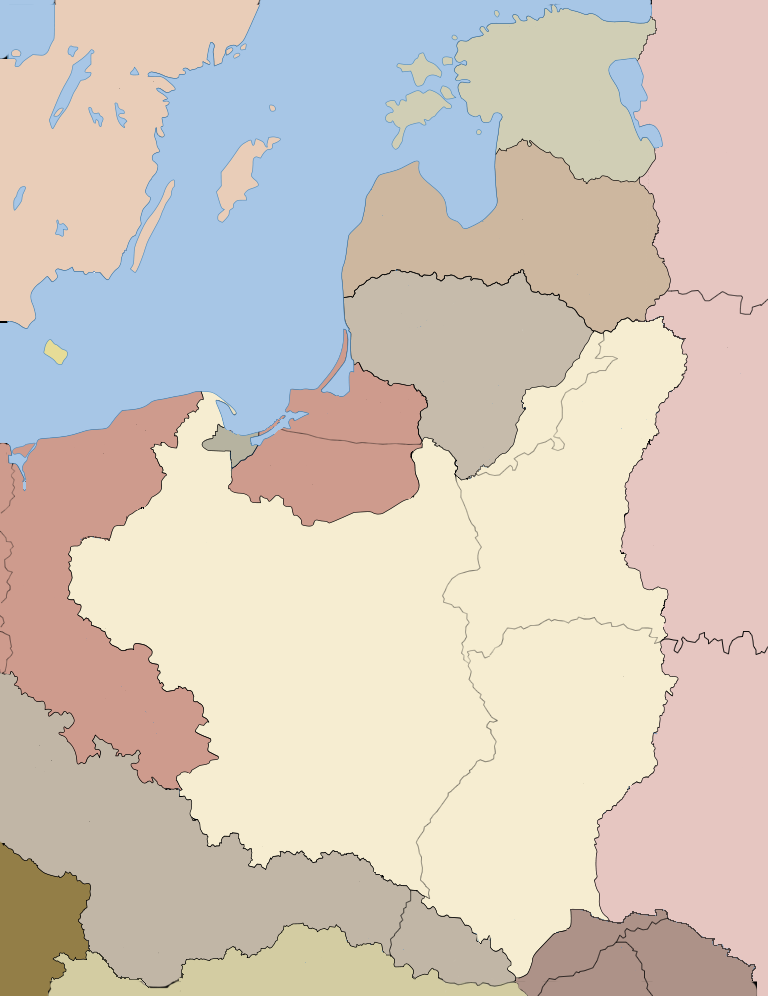
- Location of the Massacre on the map of interwar Poland
- Location: 50°55′00″N 24°34′00″E; Dominopol, Volhynian Voivodeship, occupied Poland
- Date: July 11, 1943
- Target: ethnic Poles
- Attack type: Shooting and stabbing
- Weapons: Rifles, axes, bludgeons and pitchforks
- Deaths: 490–900 with 250 victims confirmed
- Perpetrator: Ukrainian Insurgent Army
- Motive: Anti-Catholicism, Anti-Polish sentiment, Ukrainian irredentism

Dominopol (Russian: Доминополь; Ukrainian: Домінопіль) is a defunct village located in the present-day area of Volodymyr-Volynskyi Raion of Volyn Oblast in Ukraine. On July 11, 1943, at the height of the Massacres of Poles in Volhynia, the village was attacked by a death squad of Ukrainian Insurgent Army aided by the Ukrainian peasants, and all ethnic Poles were murdered. Before World War II, Dominopol was a village in the Eastern regions of the Second Polish Republic, located in the Gmina Werba, Powiat Włodzimierz of the Wołyń Voivodeship. The area was invaded by the Soviet Union in 1939 and during Operation Barbarossa annexed by Nazi Germany into Reichskommissariat Ukraine in 1941.

== The massacre ==
The Dominopol massacre was unique in that it was preceded by the forest execution of several dozen young Polish partisans (15 to 20-years-old) trained by the former Polish Army officers including Stanisław Dąbrowski, who were tricked into believing in the joint Polish-Ukrainian resistance under the umbrella of the Ukrainian Insurgent Army (UPA). Most civilian victims in Dominopol were killed by axes and knives. Their number remains the subject of debate. Some sources estimate that approximately 60 Polish families have been murdered in the village by the Ukrainian nationalists, which is around 490 people including children. Other sources put the number of victims at 220–250 based on existing documentation. Afterwards, possessions of murdered Poles were looted by Ukrainian peasants who also participated in the massacre, and the village was burned.

Contemporary reports from the "Sich" unit of Ukrainian Insurgent Army, which was responsible for the action, claimed that the operation had been aimed at eliminating "secret agents" of German police among the Polish resistance. Documents from the Ukrainian side mention 150 participants from the rows of Ukrainian Insurgent Army, and estimate the number of victims at 900, including 10 Polish partisans. On 17 July, a leaflet was published by Ukrainian insurgents in the area, claiming that the action had only been aimed at Poles who planned "treason" against the Ukrainian population, and ensured that repressions wouldn't involve Polish citizens who cooperated with Ukrainians. According to Ukrainian historian Ivan Patryliak, participants of the action didn't in fact distinguish between ordinary Polish civilians and suspected "agents".

== Responsibility ==
The "Sich" unit involved in the killings was at the time commanded by Porfyriy Antoniuk (nom de guerre Sosenko), a former Polish Army corporal of Ukrainian ethnicity, who had joined the Ukrainian Insurgent Army earlier that year. In March 1944, after having been forced to retreat from the area of Dominopol by Soviet partisans, Antoniuk was sentenced to death by a military court of the Ukrainian Insurgent Army and executed by firing squad.

== Legacy ==
In 2002, due to efforts of Association of Poles Murdered in the East from Zamość, a commemorative cross was erected where once Dominopol was.

== See also ==
- Massacres of Poles in Volhynia and Eastern Galicia
