= Wiśniowiec massacres =

Coordinates: 49.9000°N 25.7333°E

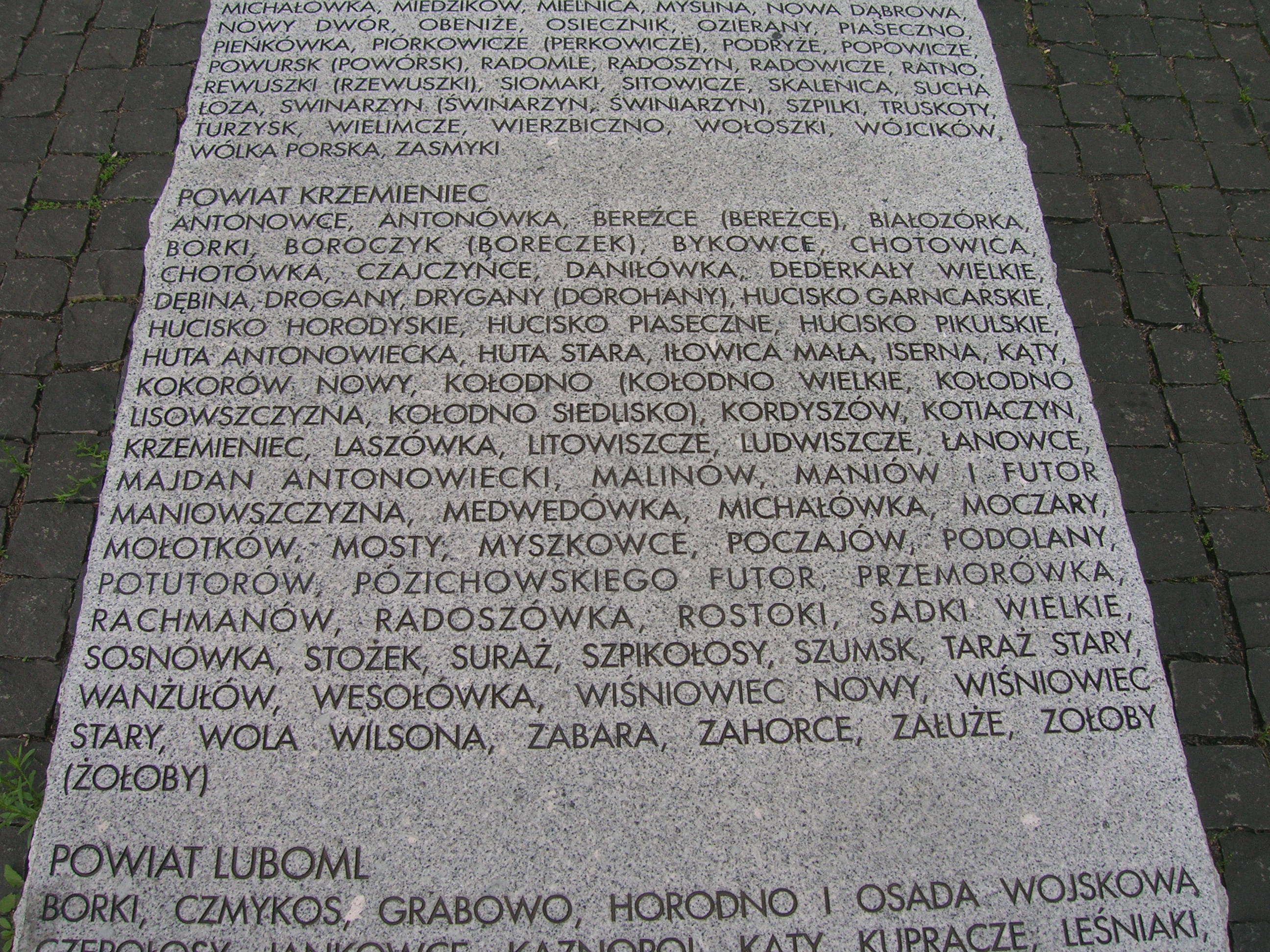
- Monument in memory of the Polish victims of Volhynian massacre including Wiśniowiec Nowy and Wiśniowiec Stary, Warsaw
- Date: 1943-1944
- Location: Wiśniowiec, German-occupied Poland, present-day Ukraine
- Type: killings
- Participants: Ukrainian Insurgent Army, SB OUN
- Deaths: c. 490

Wiśniowiec massacres (of Poles). In the monastery of Discalced Carmelites and in the city Wiśniowiec (Vyshnivets) in February 1944 an armed group of the OUN massacred 300 Poles who had sought refuge there. Most people were hiding in the monastery and in the abandoned Vyshnivets Palace. At the same time in the village Wiśniowiec Stary took place another massacre, where 138 Poles were killed by UPA.

== See also ==
- Massacres of Poles in Volhynia and Eastern Galicia
