= Hurby massacre =

World War II atrocity

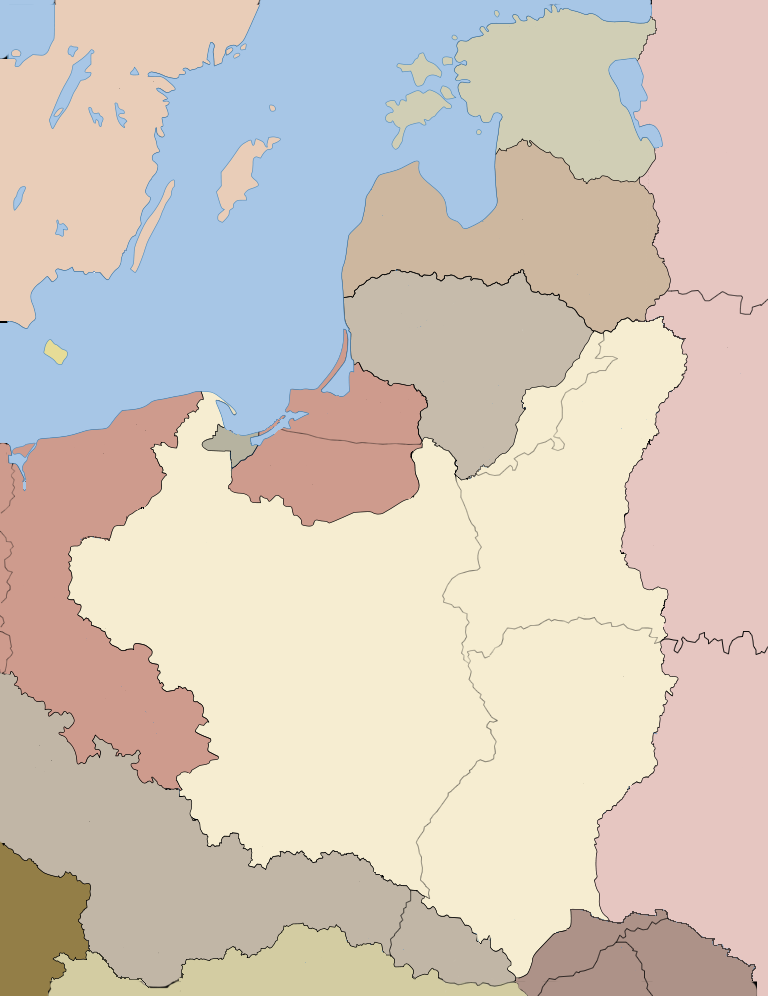
- Location of the Massacre (map of the Second Polish Republic from before the German-Soviet invasion of 1939)
- Date: June 2, 1943
- Location: Hurby village, German-occupied Poland, present-day location in Ukraine
- Type: Civilian massacre
- Motive: Anti-Catholicism, Anti-Polish sentiment, Greater Ukraine, Ukrainisation
- Participants: Ukrainian Insurgent Army, CKB
- Deaths: c. 250

Hurby massacre was a mass murder of the Polish population of the Hurby village, perpetrated on June 2, 1943, by a death squad of the Ukrainian Insurgent Army (UPA) and so-called brushwood self defence commando (Ukrainian: Самооборонні Кущові Відділи, СКВ) made up of Ukrainian peasants, during the province-wide Massacres of Poles in Volhynia and Eastern Galicia in World War II. Hurby (Ukrainian: Гурби) belonged to the Second Polish Republic before the war began. It used to be located in the powiat Zdobłunowski of the Wołyń Voivodeship. It is now a valley (урочище, or uroczysko) by the same name in western Ukraine. About 250 Poles were murdered in the attack, which was confirmed by the UPA commander for Volyn, Dmytro Klyachkivsky, who said in his communique of June 1943 that Hurby had been set on fire by the organisation.

== Eyewitness testimony ==
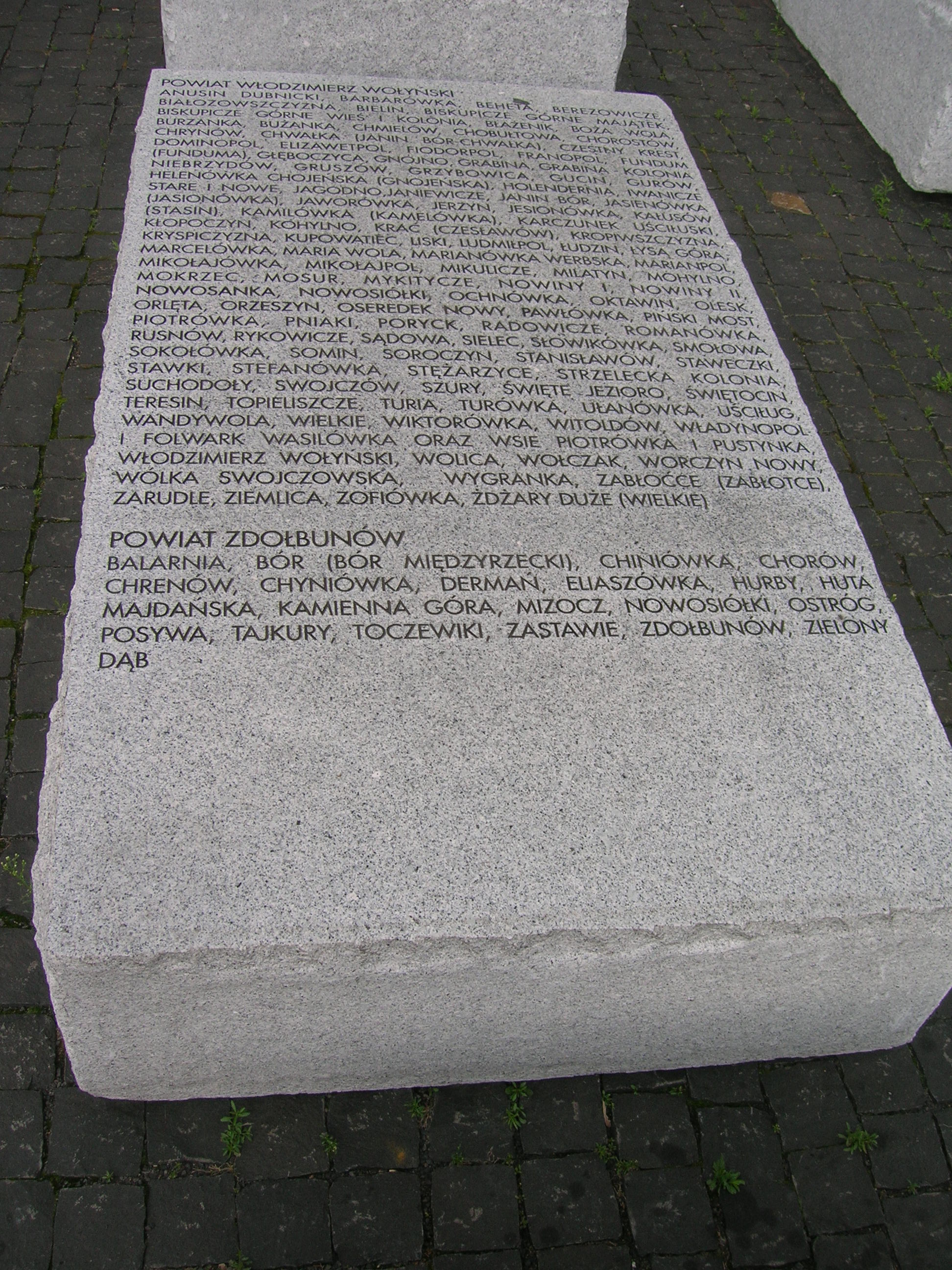
Commemorative stone featuring Hurby, part of Warsaw monument with locations of OUN-UPA murders

An eyewitness account of the massacre from the already translated testimony of Irena Gajowczyk was published by the Ministry of Foreign Affairs as part of online "Witnesses of the massacre speak out" initiative in 2016.

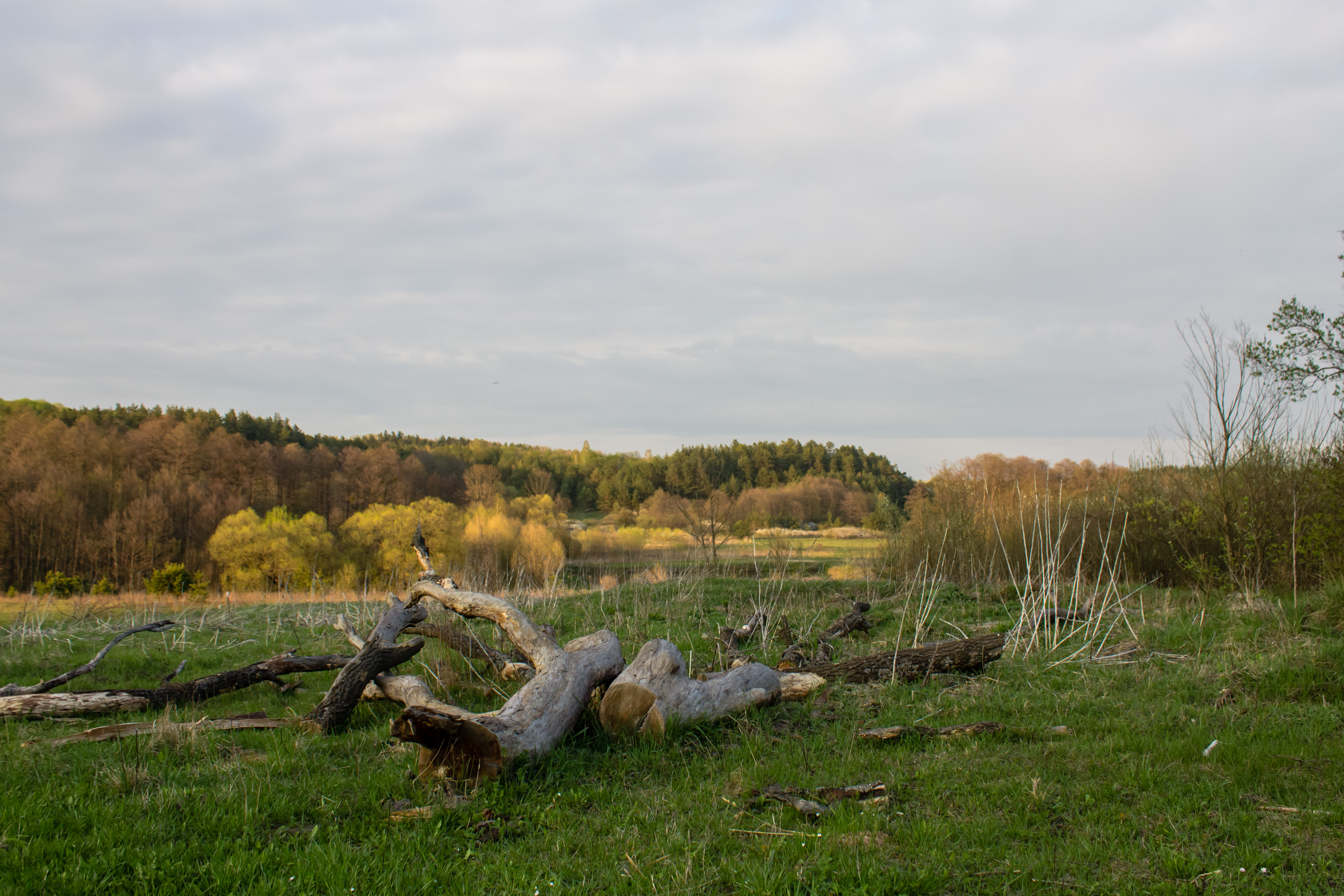
Location of eradicated village in present-day west Ukraine.

== See also ==
Massacres of Poles in Volhynia and Eastern Galicia
