= Głęboczyca massacre =

1943 massacre of Poles

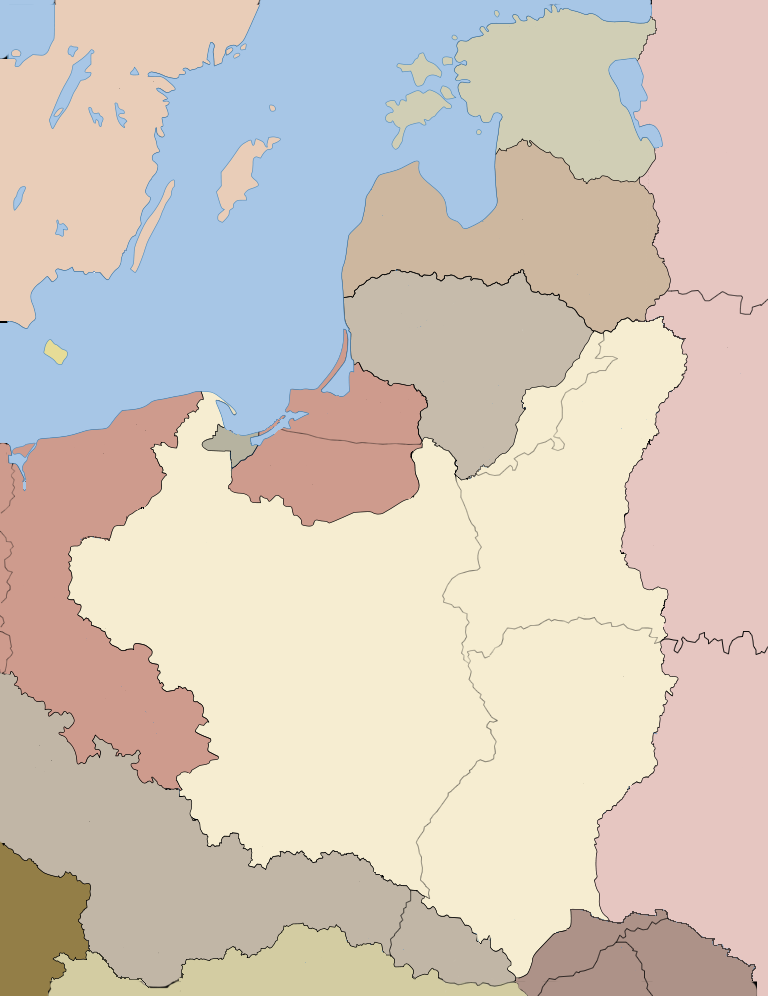
- Location of the Massacre (map of the Second Polish Republic from before the German-Soviet invasion of 1939)
- Location: 50°50′53″N 24°19′20″E; Głęboczyca, Volhynian Voivodeship, occupied Poland
- Date: 29 August 1943
- Target: Poles
- Attack type: Shooting and stabbing
- Weapons: Axes, bludgeons
- Deaths: 250
- Perpetrator: Ukrainian Insurgent Army
- Motive: Anti-Catholicism, Anti-Polish sentiment, Greater Ukraine, Ukrainisation

Głęboczyca massacre was a mass murder of ethnic Poles carried out on 29 August 1943 by the troops of the Ukrainian Insurgent Army aided by the Ukrainian peasants. It exclusively targeted Polish inhabitants of the Głęboczyca colony, located in the Włodzimierz County (powiat włodzimierski) of the Wołyń Voivodeship in the Second Polish Republic (now, part of Volodymyr-Volynskyi Raion, north of Volodymyr, Ukraine). About 250 Poles were killed, including 199 known by name including women and children. Głęboczyce does not exist anymore. It was swept from existence during the Massacres of Poles in Volhynia and Eastern Galicia, along with the neighbouring settlement of Ostrówek in powiat Luboml.

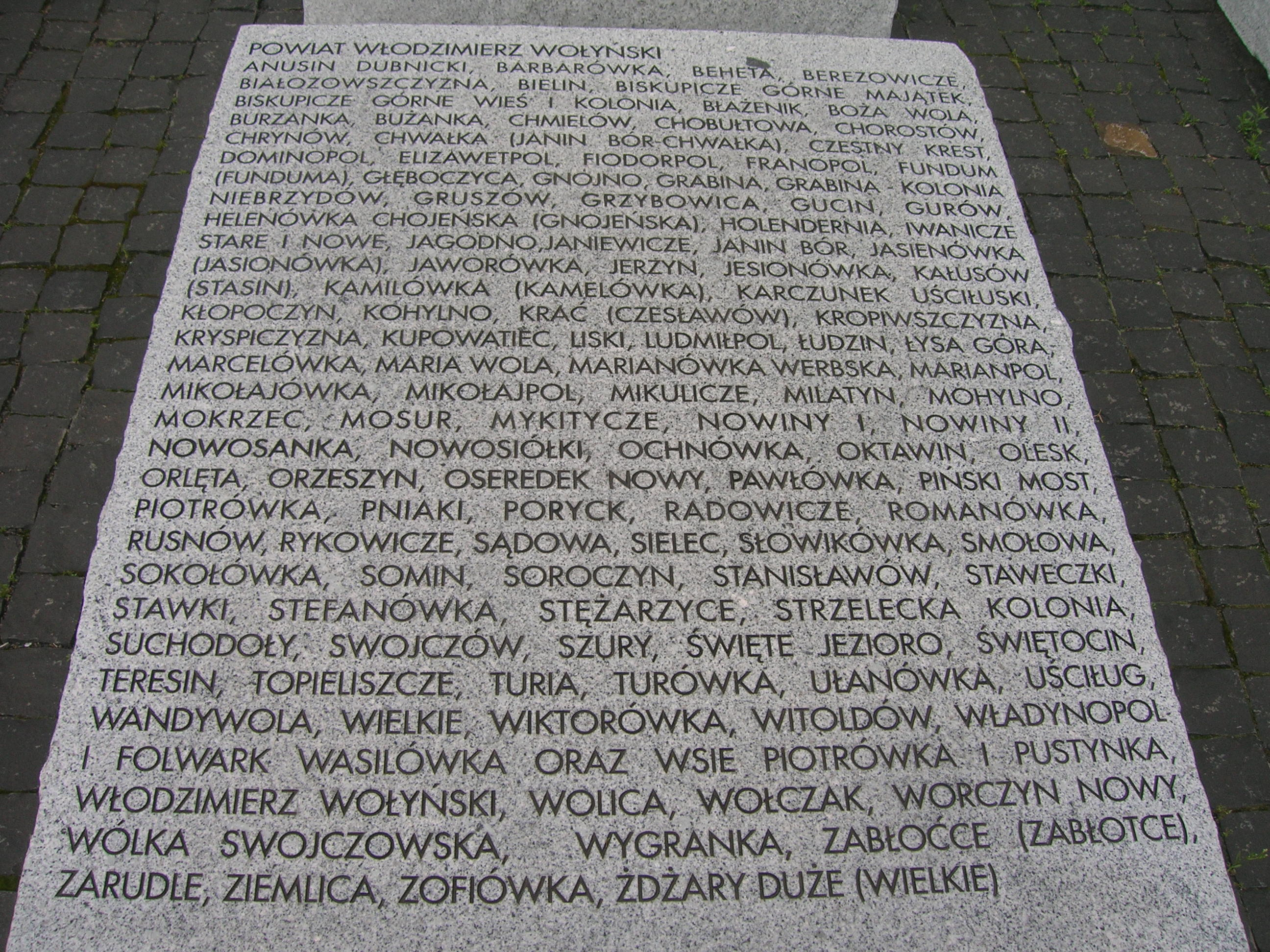
Commemorative stone listing locations of OUN-UPA murders with the mention of Głęboczyca

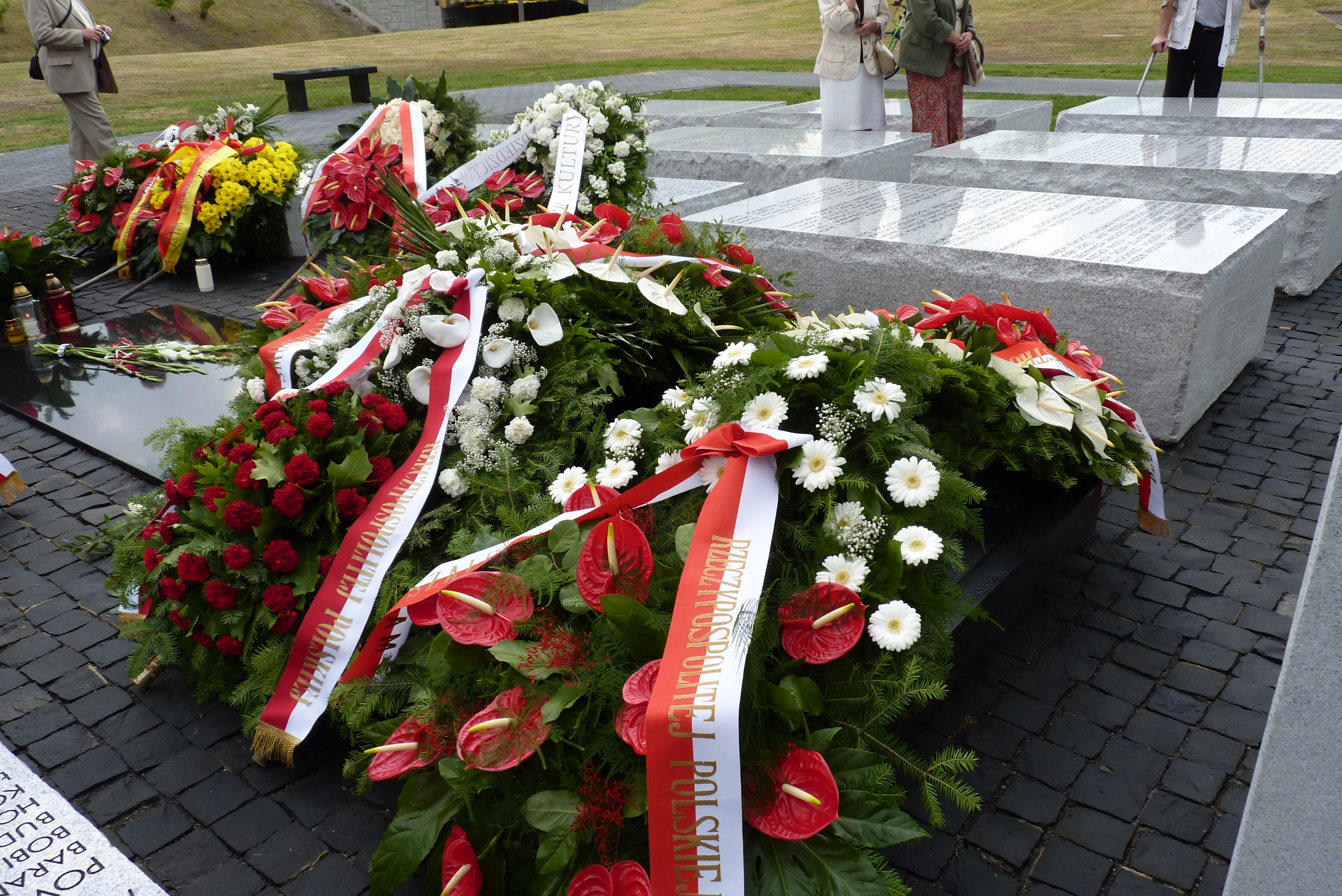
View of the memorial, Warsaw
