= Svynaryn =

Svynaryn Свинарин Świnarzyn
- Village
- Interactive map of Svynaryn
- Location of Svynaryn within Volyn Oblast Location of Svynaryn within Ukraine
- Coordinates: 50°57′N 24°40′E
- Country: Ukraine
- Oblast: Volyn Oblast
- Raion: Kovel Raion
- Time zone: UTC+2 (EET)
  - Summer (DST): UTC+3 (EEST)

Svynaryn (Ukrainian: Свинарин; Polish: Świnarzyn) is a village in Volyn Oblast (province) Ukraine; before World War II, part of Wołyń Voivodeship, Poland. Other names: S'vinazhyn, Swinarzyn, Svinazhin.

== World War II ==
Under German occupation in World War II, a heavily fortified Ukrainian command headquarters of the UPA-North resided in the Świnarzyn Forest. Between January and March 1944, the town was one of several sites of battle between the Volhynia 27th Infantry Division of the Polish Home Army consisting of almost 8,000 men and women under Kazimierz Bąbiński, and the Ukrainian Insurgent Army. The 27th Division gave support to local self-defence against the UPA raids during the wave of massacres of Poles in Wołyń Voivodeship.

Nearby cities and towns include: west, Koloniya Verbichno Pervoye (2.7 nm); north: Verbichno (2.8 nm), Tulichev (3.1 nm), Cherniyuv (1.2 nm); east: Makovichi (2.1 nm), Serkizuv (2.1 nm); south: Chesnuvka (4.4 nm), Osekruv (2.1 nm). Altitude: 202 meters, or 666 feet.

== See also ==
- Massacres of Poles in Volhynia
