= Budy Ossowskie massacre =

Atrocity in Poland during World War II

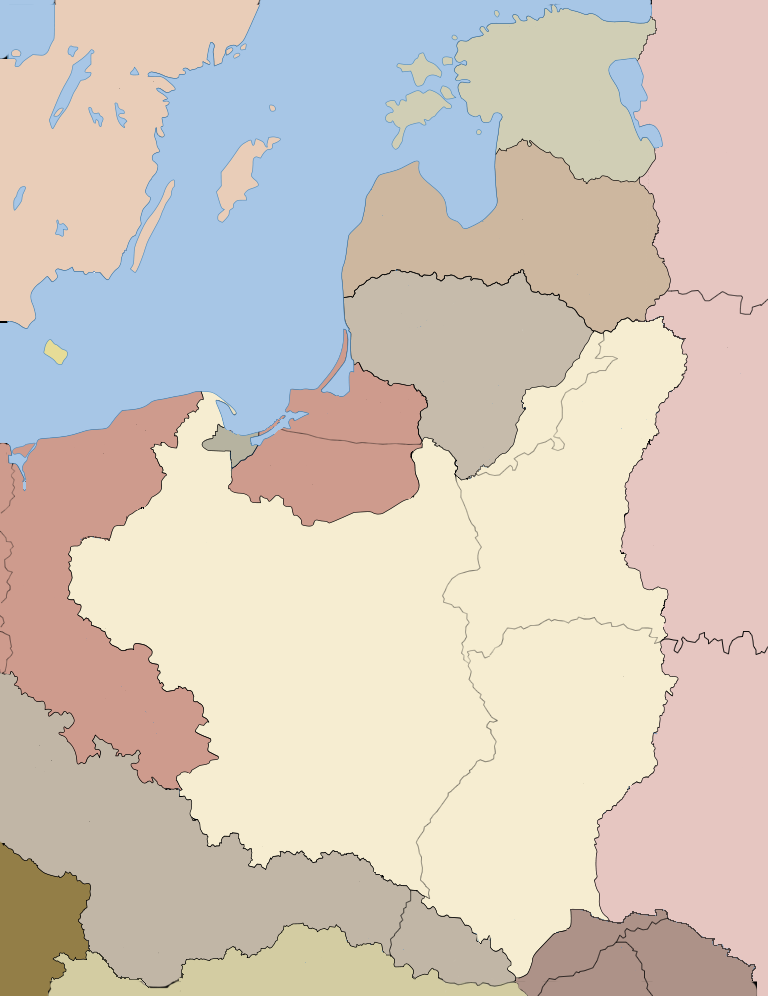
- Location of the Massacre (map of the Second Polish Republic from before the German-Soviet invasion of 1939)
- Location: 51°13′0″N 24°43′0″E; Budy Ossowskie, Volhynian Voivodeship, occupied Poland
- Date: 29 August 1943
- Target: Poles
- Attack type: Shooting and stabbing
- Weapons: Axes, bludgeons, bayonets
- Deaths: 290
- Perpetrator: Ukrainian Insurgent Army
- Motive: Anti-Catholicism, Anti-Polish sentiment, Greater Ukraine

Budy Ossowskie massacre was a mass murder of ethnic Poles carried out on 29–30 August 1943 by a death squad of the Ukrainian Insurgent Army aided by the Ukrainian peasants during the Massacres of Poles in Volhynia and Eastern Galicia. About 290 people were killed, including women and children, all of them, Polish inhabitants of the Budy Ossowskie village, located in the Kowel County (powiat kowelski) of the Wołyń Voivodeship in the Second Polish Republic (now, part of the Kovel Raion, south-west of Kovel, Ukraine). Budy Ossowskie village does not exist anymore. It was burned to the ground by the OUN-UPA. The charred remnants of the village were cleared in Soviet Ukraine for grazing cattle. Overall, in the Kowel County some 7,300 ethnic Poles were murdered.

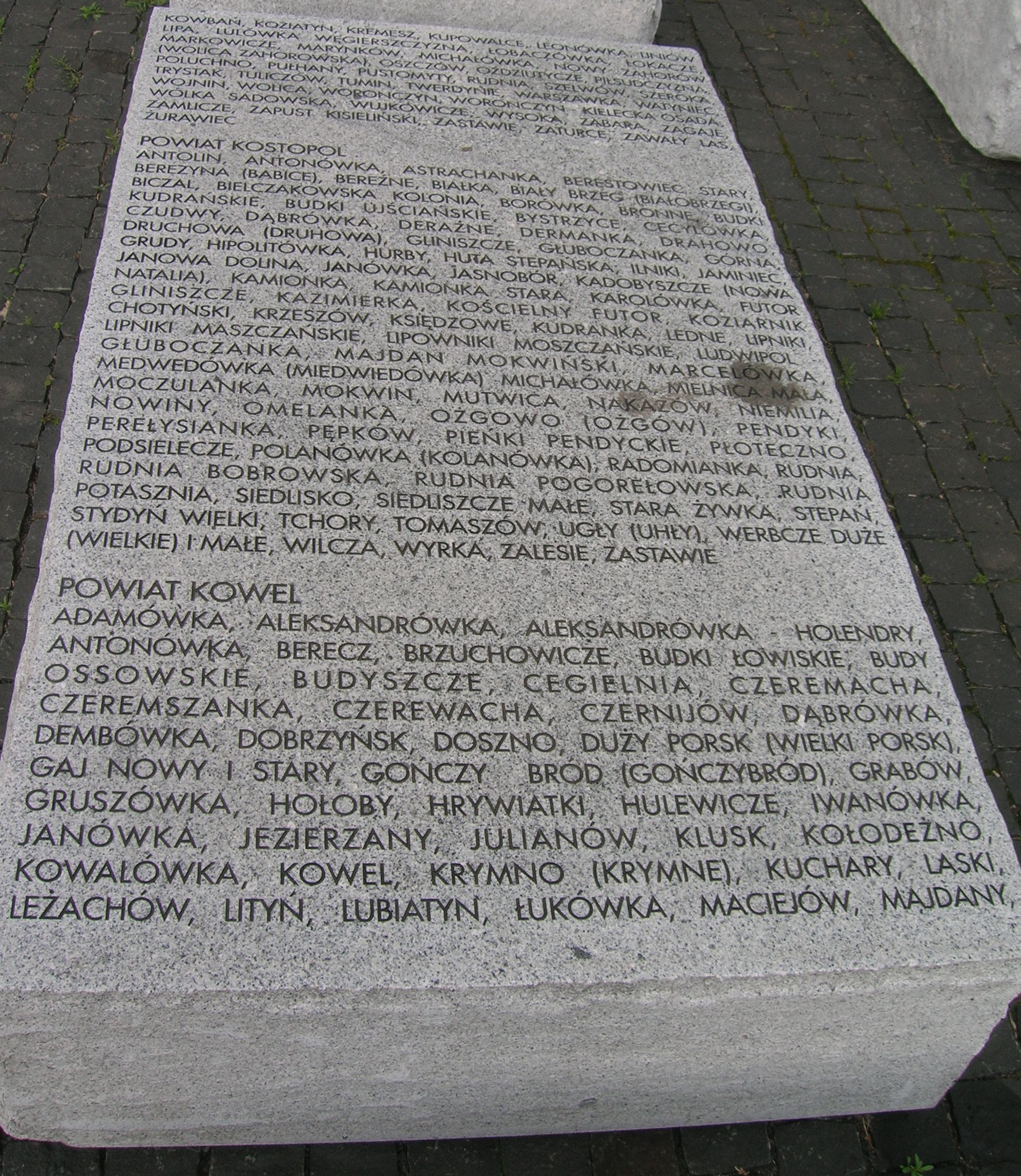
Commemorative stone listing locations of OUN-UPA murders with the mention of Budy Ossowskie

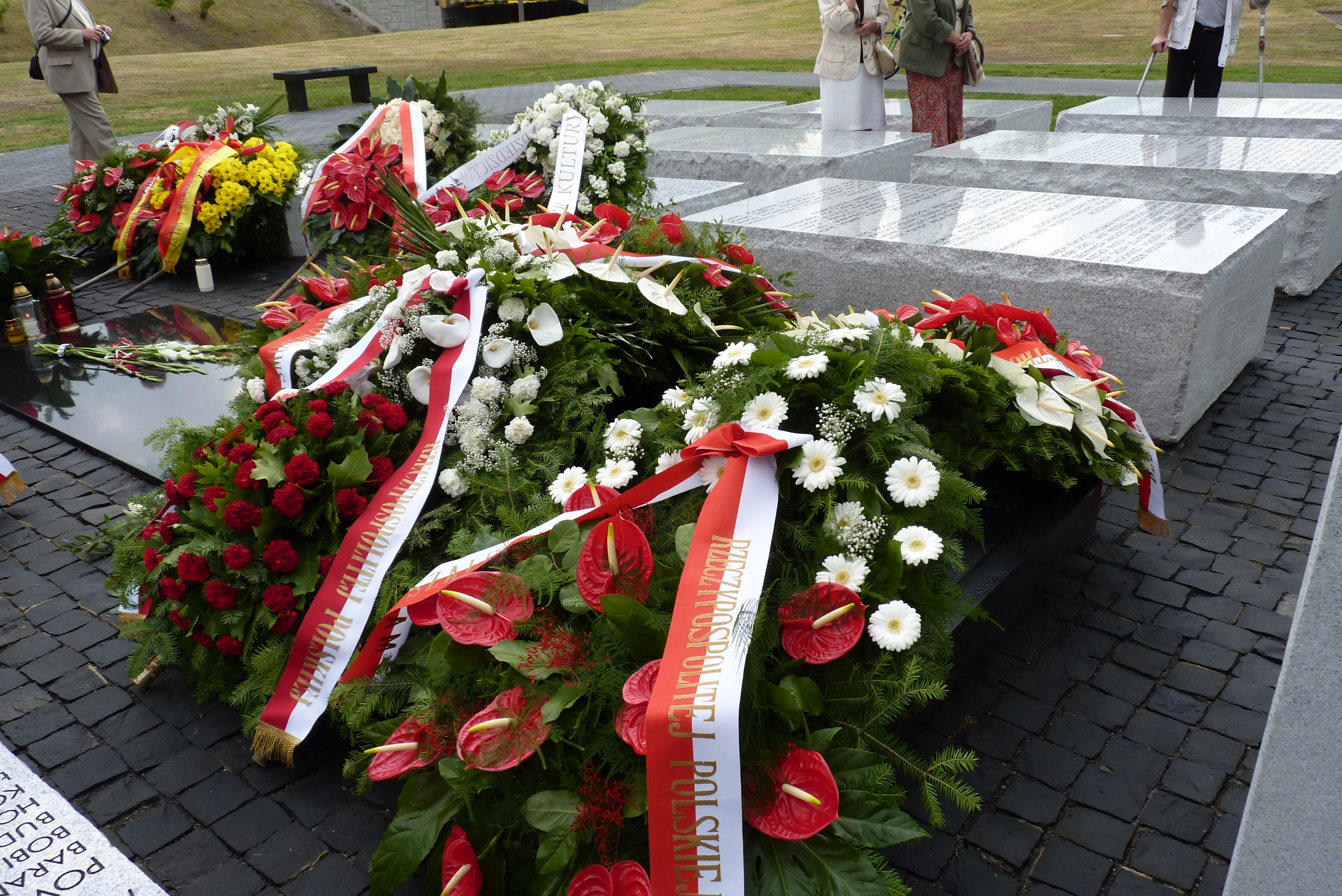
View of the memorial, Warsaw
