= Historiography of the massacres of Poles in Volhynia and Eastern Galicia =

This article presents the historiography of the massacres of Poles in Volhynia and Eastern Galicia, as presented by historians in Poland and Ukraine after World War II.

Beginning in March 1943, and lasting until early 1945, a violent ethnic cleansing operation against Poles – conducted primarily by the Ukrainian Insurgent Army (UPA) – occurred in the regions of Eastern Galicia and Volhynia (now in Western Ukraine). According to political scientist Nathaniel Copsey, research into this event was quite partisan until 2009 (with some exceptions), and dominated by Polish researchers, some of whom lived there at the time or are descended from those who did. The most thorough is the work of Ewa and Władysław Siemaszko, the result of years of research conducted with the goal of demonstrating that the Poles were victims of genocide. Nonetheless, the 45 years of state censorship resulted in an excessive supply of works described as "heavy in narrative", "light in analysis" and "inherently – though perhaps unconsciously – biased against Ukrainians."

== Polish historiography ==
=== Communist Poland ===
The Polish historiography of the Volyn tragedy during the dictatorship of the communist party can be broken down into three periods:

- End 1950–1960s
- First half of the 1970s
- Second half of the 1980s

In the early People's Republic of Poland, the question of the Polish–Ukrainian conflict was never a subject of independent studies. Ukrainian historian Roman Hrytskiv believes that Polish Communists avoided this subject as it could raise questions regarding the Polish population in Western Ukraine.

Paweł Machcewicz from the Polish Institute of National Remembrance suggests two reasons why, up until the collapse of communism, censorship blocked the subject of the massacres of Poles in Volhynia and Eastern Galicia perpetrated by the OUN-UPA:

- Ukrainians were considered a friendly Soviet nation (a member of the USSR) and any mention of the Polish-Ukrainian conflict would be seen as anti-Soviet.
- The previously Polish territories of Volhynia and Eastern Galicia were incorporated into the Soviet Union; therefore any reference to those lost lands would be treated as anti-Soviet revisionism.

As the subject matter of the anti-Polish action in Volhynia and Eastern Galica was prohibited, in Polish popular remembrance of the Ukrainian Insurgent Army (UPA), the site of the mass killings was transferred to Bieszczady and Eastern Lubelszczyzna; and thus communists were able to portray Operation Vistula as the only effective way of liquidating the UPA network. The theme of UPA "terrorism" was occasionally brought up in order to affirm the actions of the "people's government". According to Hrytskiv, Polish studies branded all Ukrainian nationalist organizations as anti-Polish, criminal and collaborationist.

New studies were initiated in the early 1970s based on factual information. Under the influence of the Soviet historiography, Polish historians continued to expound the mistaken Soviet concept of Ukrainian bourgeoise nationalists, viewed in their own specific manner. This category includes the works of Ryszard Torzecki, who explained the reason for the conflict as Hitlerite politics based on the tenet of divide and conquer, the chauvinism of Ukrainian nationalists, and Ukrainian-Polish disagreements in the interbellum, which were used by the Nazis in their interests. Similar concepts were formulated by A. Szczesiak and W. Szota in a publication that was soon removed from sale and libraries. Officially the book was dedicated to the activities of the Ukrainian nationalists in the interbellum but it also explained that the conflict had its origins in the late 19th century, and that the Volyn tragedy was a continuation of the terror campaigns of 1918–1939. This work investigated in detail the Ukrainian-Polish negotiations from 1942–45 to stop the conflict and to unite to fight a common foe – the USSR. This study brought about a re-evaluation of the UPA within the USSR itself.

The next significant study was published in the mid-1980s by Edward Prus – Heroes under the sign of the Trident (1985), which employed a journalistic and propagandistic style. Prus was the first to introduce the terms and concepts such as the Ukrainian "slaughter" Polish: rzeź of Poles. He compares the anti-Polish actions in Volyn and Galicia without the use of academic citations. According to Hryckiw, Prus's work has no scientific merit. In his opinion, the use of a journalistic style, falsification, and manipulation reflect the state of Polish historiography in the last years of the communist Poland.

=== Independent Poland ===
1989 marked the end of the Polish totalitarian state and a new era in Polish historiography. In the light of Polish independence the subject of Ukrainian–Polish relations became a growing concern. The first study to be published was Tadeusz Olszański's 1989 article which shattered previous understandings of the OUN. He ascribes the reason for the Volyn tragedy to the inadequate policies of the Polish government in the interbellum and the destruction of moral society during the Soviet and German occupations. Olszański notes that in pre-war Poland, a Ukrainian nationalist movement could develop relatively freely even in the most radical forms, including the use of terror, and that the Polish state wasn't able to solve the problems concerning coexistence of Poles and Ukrainians, which resulted in popularization of nationalist and communist movements among the Ukrainians.

Olszański introduces the term "de-polonisation". Olszański suggests that the OUN expected a return to the situation as it was from 1918, when Poles and Ukrainians fought over disputed territories, and that the Ukrainian leadership wanted an absence of Polish population and Polish military activity. De-polonization action started in March 1943. Contrary to what Ukrainian émigré authors claim, the fact of Ukrainian initiative and the unprovoked character of the action is confirmed by the German documents. In the article from 1991, he divides "Volhynian terror" into the following stages:

- Up to December 1942 – murders of individual Poles and Polish families
- From the beginning of 1943 – growth in attacks against Poles, which reached critical point in March 1943, the first point at which one can speak of mass terror
- July – August 1943 – apogee of terror; Ukrainians also assault Polish self-defence forces; spread of terror to Eastern Galician districts
- From September 1943 – attacks decline and Polish–Ukrainian confrontations gradually become more military in nature.

Olszański underlines the influence of numerous provocations by the NKVD and Soviet partisans in the occupied zones in directing conflict against the UPA. Retaliatory actions by Polish forces and the negative view of the Polish underground to Ukrainian independence were also factors. In the second period Olszański states that the Polish underground and the communists initiated a number of anti-Ukrainian terrorist actions. Ukrainian responses were restrained as at this time negotiations were being undertaken for a united Ukrainian–Polish front against Moscow. This was the first step to an understanding with the Poles, which in 1945 was affirmed by the tactical understanding between the UIA and AK. In the words of Olszawski, this was the end of conflict between these national movements, who would now wage a joint battle against the communist regime in Poland.

The UPA was unable to conduct the action alone. It mobilized Ukrainian peasants on a large scale, who were later given Polish properties. Vast numbers of peasants participating in anti-Polish attacks, together with UPA units or individually, were also motivated by numerous Banderist agitators and by communist agents from the north of Volhynia. Olszański sees the role of Soviets in the events as insufficiently explained. He points that field organizations of the OUN were penetrated by communist agents and in some instances Soviet units disguised as UPA murdered Poles to gain support of local Polish population.

According to Olszański, the responsibility for the terror lies mostly on the OUN-B leadership, which decided to perform the large-scale anti-Polish action.

Olszański expressed view that the goal of the action was to expel Poles and not to exterminate them. Ten years later, in the post script to his previous article, he admitted that he was wrong: "More and more documents prove not only that the de-polonization action was a planned military operation and that the order from OUN-UPA leadership existed (though still not found), but also that the purpose of this operation was physical extermination (murder) of at least most of the Polish population of these lands, and not only – as I erroneously believed – expulsion. Thus it was the crime of genocide."

Zbigniew Kowalewski's study (1993) stated that the role of the auxiliary police and its collaboration with Soviet Polish diversionist-partisan groups provoked the Ukrainians to use force. These actions were not just those of the OUN and UPA, but also Soviet partisans, auxiliary police and other independent groups. Kowalewski introduces the thesis that the reason why OUN changed its strategy regarding the Poles in 1944–45 was in order to form a unified Polish-Ukrainian front against the USSR. This would explain the waves of OUN propaganda that were spread in the Polish population regarding the formation of a unified front and the cessation of retributive actions. The Ukrainian and some sections of the Polish population understood that without an independent Poland there could not be an independent Ukraine.

The destruction of the totalitarian system in Poland allowed another direction in Polish historical studies fuelled by the previous studies published under the Communist regime. One of the first such studies was undertaken by J. Turowski and Władysław Siemaszko in 1990, based on 350 eyewitness accounts from veterans of the Polish Home army regarding the anti-Polish terror in Volyn. Subsequently, Władysław with daughter Ewa Siemaszko – in their own ten-year-long research project – went on to document murders committed on Polish citizens by Ukrainian Insurgents in some 1,865 villages and towns of Volhynia during the Nazi and Soviet occupations. Their books were based on witness accounts, court documents including transcripts from trials of Ukrainian war criminals, as well as the Polish national archives and statistical censuses. In 2010 the Institute of National Remembrance (Bulletin No. 7–8, 116–117) published an overview by Ewa Siemaszko of their joint research with the following up-to-date table of collected data.

Polish people murdered by OUN-UPA and other Ukrainian nationalists in 1939–1948: documented numbers and approximations
Voivodeships	Recorded number of settlements where the murders took place	Documented number of Poles massacred (a round number)	Number of Polish victims known by their names	Estimated victims above numbers already established	Approximated number of murdered Poles (a round number)^{+}
Wołyń	1,865	~ 38,600	22,113	21,400	~ 60,000
Lwów	1,007	~ 15,400	6,397	9,395	~ 24,800
Stanisławów	422	~ 11,700	3,843	6,700	~ 18,400
Tarnopol	850	~ 23,000	10,143	4,585	~ 27,600
Total	4,144	~ 88,700	42,496	42,080	~ 130,800

The fall of the Communist system in Poland gave fuel to two directions in Polish historiography regarding the Ukrainian–Polish conflicts: liberal-democrаtic and nationalistic. The first group has focused on the reasons for the inter-ethnic conflict in Western Ukraine. This group is subscribed to by most professional historians. The second group focuses on the problems of anti-Polish terror by the UPA. This movement is supported by former inhabitants of Volyn and Galicia and members of the various Kresy societies.

The Polish emigre centre in London at this time began to actively support a nationalist view on the Volyn tragedy. In 1992, a magazine called Na rubieży began publishing studies by W. Siemaszko, E. Prus and Wiktor Poliszczuk. Attempts were made to document the Polish victims of Ukrainian nationalists, with the inclusion of unverified or even falsified information. Numerous memoirs were published, dominated by the works of E. Prus. Many of these publications were printed by the newly established Nortom publishing house in Wrocław.

The liberal-democratic movement is represented by the works of Ryszard Torzecki which reviewed the thesis put forward during the communist administration and developed a framework for further scholarship. Torzecki argues that the territorial integrity of Volyn lay in the Polish population. From this point of view the author examines anti-Polish actions, the spontaneous actions of the peasants, and the influence of OUN propaganda on their fight for social justice. Describing concrete incidence of terror in Volyn, he states that the pivotal moment for the development of bloodshed came with the transfer of armed Ukrainian police into the forests. This act raised the number of OUN-B dependent groups with people who had experience in the ethnic cleansing of Jews. Secondly it initiated a mass movement of Poles into the ranks of the auxiliary police, which further escalated the situation. The author postulates that anti-Polish terror may have been planned, it had as its main purpose to chase out the Poles. Torzecki states that the raid by Sydir Kovpak introduced a significant destabilizing factor to the region and initiated the formation of Ukrainian National Defence – the group which first initiated the anti-Polish actions. The discussions between the Polish and Ukrainian sides were doomed to failure because they were based on tactical considerations.

Although Torzecki states that in 1943–44 the attempts to curtail the conflict between Ukrainian and Polish nationalism were doomed to failure, in his opinion it was OUN-UPA that could have stopped the conflict and did not. He lays blame personally on Roman Shukhevych, who was accustomed to dealing with problems from a position of force, and would consider using terror on the civilian population.

In his 1997 study, Filar came to the conclusion that the sole result of the actions of OUN and UPA were to destroy the Polish population. This he bases on a command given by Klym Savur regarding the liquidation of the urban Polish population. Information about this command was obtained from a criminal deposition of Yuri Stelmashchuk which existed in the archive of the SBU in Volyn. The command was a secret one given orally by D. Kliachkivsky to liquidate all Polish elements in the region. Filar comes to the conclusion that UPA consciously aimed their actions against the civilian Polish population. He also concludes that the UPA made its priority the extermination of Polish elements rather than fighting the occupiers.

Grzegorz Motyka and Rafal Wnuk point out that at the end of World War II there was a real potential for Polish–Ukrainian dialogue and understanding. As a result, the two anti-communist forces UPA and WiN signed tactical agreements regarding further cooperation. A new era in Polish–Ukrainian relations for the struggle for freedom meant that former conflicts lost their principal meaning.

In a further study in 1999 Motyka states that the conflict between the Ukrainian and Polish peoples ended in 1945. After that UPA fought against the Communist government in Poland and not against the Polish population, as opposed to the Poles, who continued their terror against the Ukrainian population and the Polish communists who under the guise of fighting the Ukrainian nationalist underground deported the Ukrainian population in 1947.

After the marking of the "Wisla" action the thesis of a planned "Volyn terror" became mainstream in Polish historiography. More eyewitness accounts were collected and published in 2000 (edited by W. and E. Siemaszkos) in the collection Genocide, done by Ukrainian nationalists against the Polish population of Volyn 1939-1945 which documented OUN and UPA crimes against the civilian population.

Using a solid documentary base, the authors attempt to convince the reader of the genocidal character of the anti-Polish actions of the UPA. The first volume gives a chronological and geographical listing of 1686 witnesses, archival information, and other facts. The second volume gives the authors' interpretation of these events, a summation of Polish casualties, names of the perpetrators, and other documents.

With the 60th anniversary of the Volyn tragedy in 2003, a third era in the study of Ukrainian–Polish conflict started.

In 2002 Grzegorz Motyka, finding all the previous concepts regarding the anti-Polish actions of the UPA inadequate, suggested viewing the Ukrainian–Polish relations from the point of view of the question of Ukrainian insurrection during the war. Encouraged by the mass desertion of the Ukrainian police, Dmytro Kliachkivsky (Klym Savur) initiated a wave of UPA attacks against the Polish civilian population. Kliachkivsky gave the liquidation order on July 11. By Autumn 1944 most of the anti-Polish actions stopped and terror was used only against those who co-operated with the NKVD, and the Ukrainians leaders had understood that it was time to unite with the Poles against the USSR. Polish actions against the Ukrainian civilian population were restricted and punitive in their nature according to Motyka. They were done by the Polish auxiliary police, the self-defense leagues, the AK, and by Red partisan units formed from ethnic Poles. In his latest studies, Motyka attempts to synthesize the main concepts of both current directions in Polish historiography, analyzing and understanding the problem of anti-Polish terror in Volyn, the reasons and the results, in order to induce the Ukrainians to officially condemn the activities of the OUN and UPA.

According to Roman Hrytskiv a characteristic of Polish historiography is the national component in its understanding of the problem. This is evident by the treatment of the Ukrainian–Polish conflict as an episode of purely Polish history; focusing attention to the anti-Polish terror of the UPA and demanding that the Ukrainians condemn these actions. The treatment of the anti-Ukrainian actions of the Polish underground is relegated to a secondary position, and the moral and emotional style of exposition of materials, the inclusion of materials whose authenticity is questionable (memoirs, eyewitness accounts, works of literature etc.). At the same time, it is in Poland that the professional study of Ukrainian–Polish conflict was started. Polish historians were the first to thoroughly study and analyse the facts of this conflict, developed a periodization, collected a significant number of Polish historic sources and developed a number of alternative methods of studying the problem.

== Ukrainian historiography ==
The issue of the Volyn massacres was largely non-existent in Ukrainian scholarly literature for many years, and Ukrainian historiography did not undertake any objective research of the events in Volyn. Until 1991, any independent Ukrainian historic research was only possible abroad, mainly in the US and the Canadian diaspora. Despite publishing a number of works devoted to the history of UPA, the Ukrainian emigration researchers (with only few exceptions) remained completely mute about the Volyn events for many years. Until very recently much of the remaining documentation was closed in Ukrainian state archives, unavailable to researchers. As a result, Ukrainian historiography lacks broader reliable research of the events and the presence of the issue in Ukrainian publications is still very limited. The young generation of Ukrainian historians is often infected with Ukrainocentrism, and often borrows the stereotypes and myths about Poland and Poles from the biased publications of the Ukrainian diaspora.

The active collection and publication of information regarding the Volyn Tragedy began in the summer of 2002 after it became known that Kresy organizations (made up of AK veterans and various Associations) were planning to hold commemorations in memory of only the Polish victims of the conflict. The I. Krypiakevych Institute of the Academy of Sciences of Ukraine began to collect accounts. Tetiana Kostenko has been focusing on the region of Dubno, Ivan Pusko on the regions of Volyn, and Volodymyr Sobchuk, the area around Kremenets. Yaroslav Tsaruk began collecting accounts from the area around Volodymyr-Volyns'k in 1985 and became more active in the 1990s, stimulated by the writings of Yu. Turovsky and V. Siemaszko, when he noticed that the accounts in their writings did not correspond with his own findings. Travelling by bicycle throughout the area, he collected accounts from those who remembered the events, and made lists of those who died or were wounded during the war, including accounts about Poles, Ukrainians and others. He counterchecked the accounts against information that was collected immediately after the war and again in 1976. The post war account paralleled his findings, whereas the 1976 account was specially written to show all anti-soviet actions in a negative light.

According to the Ukrainian historian Yaroslav Tsaruk, who studied the materials collected by Siemaszko from Polish villagers, the number of ethnic Poles given by them in some of the villages he is familiar with, does not correspond to recorded Ukrainian statistical data. According to Tsaruk, Siemaszko included in the number of Polish casualties those who emigrated before the commencement of these hostilities, and that Siemaszko included colonies, subdivisions of villages and population points which were never separate administrative units, enlarging the number of Polish population points.

According to the information collected by the Siemaszkos in the Volodymyr-Volynsk region only 80 Ukrainians were murdered. According to materials collected by Ya. Tsaruk 1454 Ukrainians died from the hands of Polish paramilitary groups (the names of 1244 victims have been collected). Tsaruk stated that in the Volodymyr region initially there were attacks on Ukrainian villages by Polish–German police units which were retaliated in self-defence. According to Siemaszko 1915 Poles died at the hands of Ukrainian Nationalists. According to Tsaruk there were 430.

In the village of Biskupychy Verkhni (Nekhvoroshchi) Ya. Tsaruk notes 11 murdered Ukrainians (including a 3-year-old girl and a 95-year-old grandmother) which happened May 20, 1943. Siemaszko's book mentions the murder of 90 Poles on July 11, but doesn't mention the murder of the Ukrainians that, according to Tsaruk, took place on May 20. Tsaruk gives the names of 9 Ukrainians murdered on May 20 in the village of Khmeliv; among the victims were an 18-month-old child. Siemaszko states that 11 Poles were murdered there at the beginning of August, again neglecting, according to Tsaruk, to mention the previous Ukrainian victims.

Ya. Tsaruk gives hundreds of examples of Siemaszko's selective use of information where previously Ukrainian civilians were murdered by Polish military units such as Radekhiv, Mokrets, Zashkovychi, Volytsia, Koluna, Oryshchi, Zavydiv, and Rykovychi, which Siemaszko did not mention at all.

Władysław Siemaszko stated that Tsaruk isn't a historian or a reliable source, and that his research is based on reports from the locals long after war, while Siemaszko's sources were published and are widely available. He further stated that "almost every Ukrainian family in Volhynia was involved in the murder of Poles", and that "there is a desperate attempt to paint a completely false picture of the number of the alleged Ukrainian victims at the hands of Poles, explained by psychological defence mechanisms, which in some appear as the denial of crimes".

According to the Polish historian Grzegorz Motyka Tsaruk's research didn't change his point of view on Volhynia events: that the Ukrainian nationalists were responsible for beginning and escalating the massacres of Poles. Motyka points out that Tsaruk mistakenly blames Poles for crimes perpetrated by Germans. Another Polish historian Grzegorz Hryciuk writes that Tsaruk's work has marks of "literary talent of the author which went too far".

Tsaruk's criticism of Polish historiography was echoed by Ihor Ilyushin, a prominent Ukrainian historian tasked with investigating the events in Volhynia. Ilyushn questions whether the Polish approach typified by Siemaszko can be scholarly, objective, or impartial, and considered an approach to be flawed when it is based primarily on the testimony of one, Polish, side. He also questions Siemaszko's credibility because Siemaszko was a participant at the height of the conflict himself. Ilyushin notes that Siemaszko's large tome used only three OUN-UPA documents and fails to make use of any Soviet or German materials. As an example of inaccuracy that Siemaszko' approach leads to, Ilyushin described a case discussed in Siemaszko's work in which, based on AK testimony, Siemaszko claimed that 9 Poles were killed by Ukrainian nationalists in September 1939. The same event was described in the NKVD archives in Ukraine and according to those records the perpetrators were western Ukrainian communists.

== See also ==
- Janowa Dolina massacre
