= Parośla I massacre =

1943 mass murder

Coordinates: 51°19′56″N 26°12′20″E

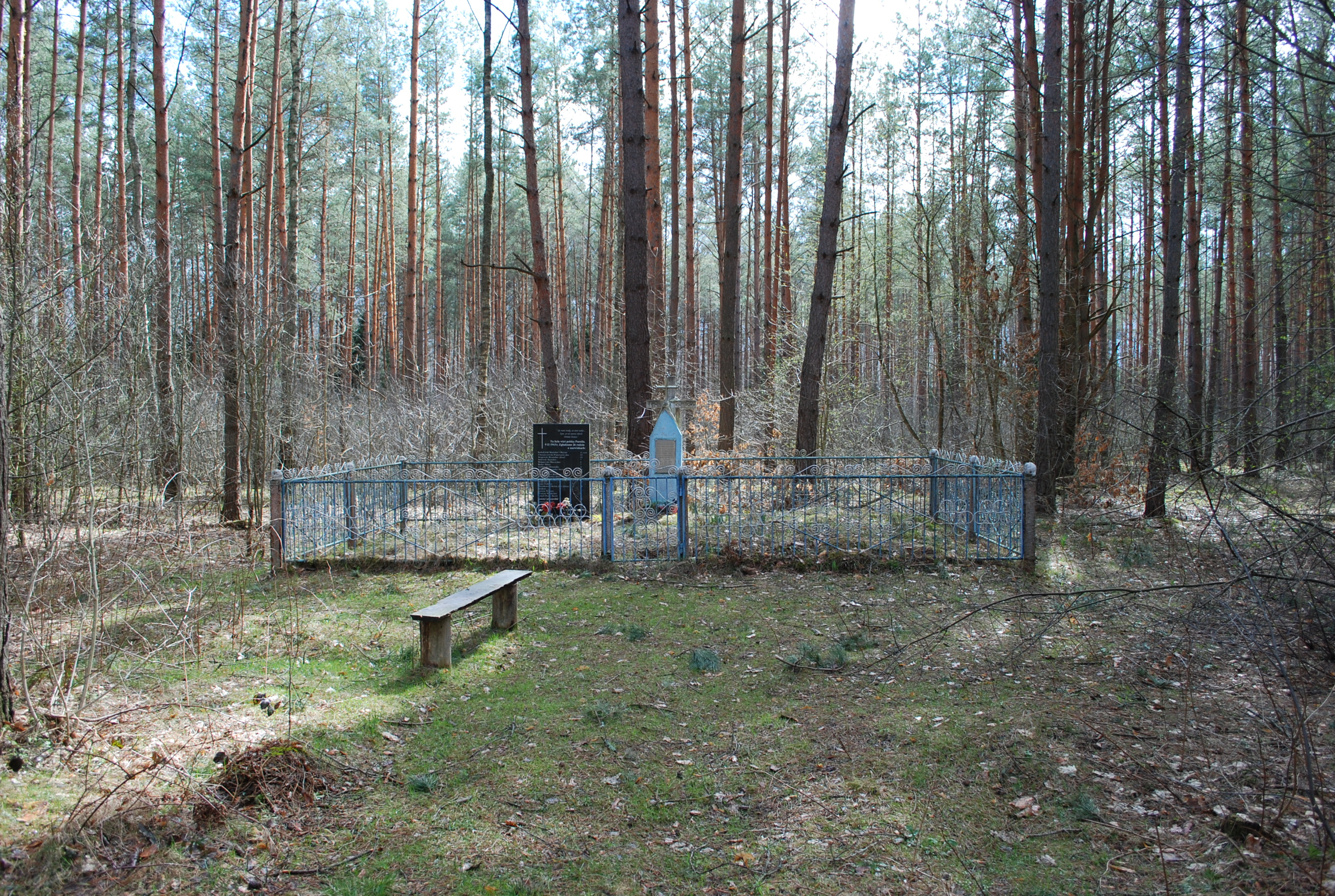
The grave of the murdered Poles in Parosla

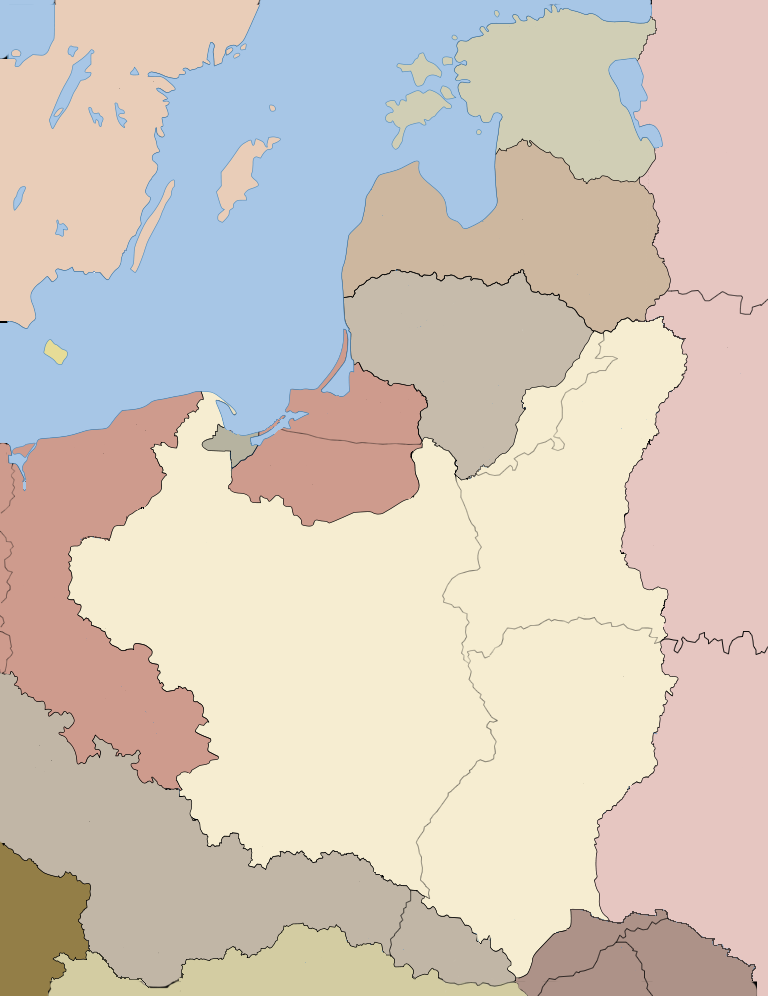
Location of the Massacre (map of Second Polish Republic from before the invasion of 1939)

The Parośla I massacre was committed during World War II by the Ukrainian Insurgent Army (UPA) under the command of Hryhorij Perehijniak "Dowbeszka-Korobka" on 9 February 1943 against the ethnic Polish residents of the village of Parośla (named Parośla I) in the Nazi-controlled Reichskommissariat Ukraine. It is considered a prelude to the ethnic cleansing of Poles in the Volhynia region by the UPA, and is recognized as the first mass murder committed by the Ukrainian Insurgent Army in the area. Estimates of the number of victims range from 149 to 173.

== Prelude ==
In the interbellum period, Parośla I, located in the community of Antonówka (there were two villages named Parośla in Antonówka, numbered I and II) was a Polish village with 26 households, part of Sarny county in the Volhynian Voivodeship.

A few days before the assault, a newly created unit of the UPA attacked the Polish village of Włodzimierzec. In a skirmish with auxiliary police (composed of Cossacks in Nazi German service), one German and three Cossacks were killed and six Cossacks taken prisoner. On the way to Parośla, Ukrainian nationalists murdered five inhabitants of the settlement of Wydymer who were working in the forest.

== Crime ==
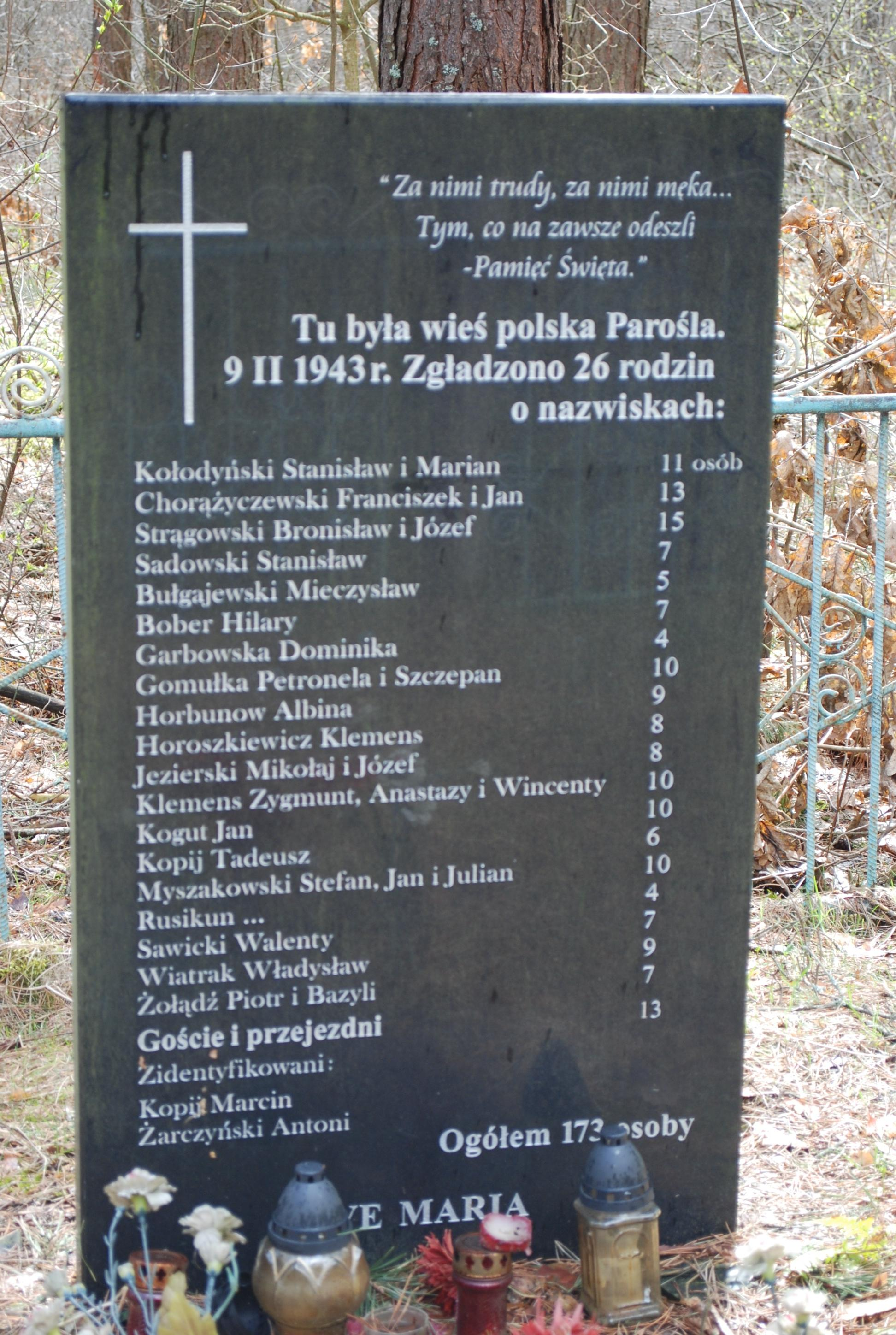
Memorial plaque in Parośla, commemorating and listing the victims.

According to statements of Polish survivors, a UPA unit entered the village pretending to be Soviet partisans. The men split up, entered the houses, and demanded food from the residents. Meanwhile, the village was surrounded, and all Poles passing through were also detained. Several UPA members stationed themselves in each household. After dinner, the UPA partisans ordered all the inhabitants to lay down and tied them up, under the pretext that they were about to carry out an assault on a nearby German rail transport and if the village inhabitants were found to be tied up, that would serve as proof for Germans, that Poles did not cooperate with the UPA in the attack. Not all the inhabitants of Parośla believed them, since some of them could speak Ukrainian, but being unarmed, they had no choice but to do as they were told.

All of the Poles were murdered with knives and axes: old men, women, children (including a six-month-old baby stuck to a table). In the Kolodyński family home, the unit's commander first interrogated the six prisoners (the Cossacks taken at Włodzimierzec) before killing them with axes. Only 12 Poles survived, including a twelve-year-old boy named Witold Kołodyński, who suffered a cracked skull from an axe blow. The houses were looted and property was taken away on sleighs. Fifteen more Poles were killed by the same UPA unit shortly afterward on the road to the khutor of Tuptyn. The next day, Poles from neighboring villages discovered the bodies. Those wounded were taken to a hospital in Włodzimierzec. German soldiers came to the village, and the corpses were buried under their supervision. One of the perpetrators, P. Wasylenko, was caught by Soviets after the war and described the crime: "All Poles were cut into pieces, babies as well".

In 1943, a cross was erected in the village to commemorate the massacre, but over time it eroded due to neglect. Years later, a local Ukrainian farmer, Antin Kowalczuk, erected another cross in a nearby forest, as well as an obelisk with information about the crime. Perehijniak, the commanding officer chiefly responsible for the massacre, was killed in action 13 days later.

== See also ==
- Historiography of the Volyn tragedy

== Sources ==
- Grzegorz Motyka (2006). Ukraińska partyzantka 1942-1960 (in Polish). Warszawa: RYTM. ISBN 83-7399-163-8.
- Władysław Siemaszko, Ewa Siemaszko (2000). Ludobójstwo dokonane przez nacjonalistów ukraińskich na ludności polskiej Wołynia 1939–1945 (in Polish). Warszawa. ISBN 83-87689-34-3.
- Tadeusz Piotrowski: Genocide and Rescue in Wolyn: Recollections of the Ukrainian Nationalist Ethnic Cleansing Campaign Against the Poles During World War II, McFarland & Company, 2000, ISBN 0-7864-0773-5.
