= Attack on Volodymyrets =

- Part of the Eastern Front of World War II
Date	7–8 February 1943
Location	Volodymyrets, Rivne Oblast
Result	Ukrainian victory

Belligerents
Ukrainian Insurgent Army	Germany

Commanders and leaders
Hryhoriy Perehiniak	Unknown

Strength
70–150	180

Casualties and losses
1 killed 2 wounded	4–63 killed 6–19 captured

The Attack on Volodymyrets or Battle of Volodymyrets was the first organised action of the Ukrainian Insurgent Army against the German forces, the attack itself was organized by Hryhoriy Perehiniak's sotnia. The attack took place on the night of February 7–8, 1943.

== Prelude ==
On January 20, 1943, UPA killed four German policemen in their attack near Gorodets settlement. German authorities responded with arrest of OUN leader "Dibrova" of the Sarny region. "Dibrova" was held in Volodymyrets where Hryhoriy Perehiniak's unit intended to organise an attack to release him. The German garrison consisted of 30 Germans, 70 Russian Cossacks and 80 Uzbeks.

== Attack ==
Due to high risk of exposure and relatively large garrison, insurgents intended to strike at night. On the night of 7–8 February, insurgents launched a surprise attack on the garrison, which allowed them to capture enemy barracks and the gendarmerie building where "Dibrova" was held prisoner. Insurgents took advantage of the panic they caused and withdrew in an organised manner.

== Aftermath ==
UPA attack on German command center in Volodymyrets was successful. OUN leader of Sarny region "Dibrova" was freed from German captivity. Insurgents suffered 1 killed and 2 wounded, while German forces suffered 7 killed, including commander. According to Fyodor Kindrat, who took part in the attack, German losses were 63 killed and 19 captured. And according to the Ewa Siemaszko and Władysław Siemaszko, German losses were 4 killed and 6 taken prisoner (later killed). This attack is also considered to be UPA's first organised battle against German forces.
