= Battle of Vilya =

1943 armed clash in Volhynia

- Part of the massacres of Poles in Volhynia and Eastern Galicia and the Polish–Ukrainian ethnic conflict during World War II
- Kostopol district
Date	6 September 1943
Location	Vilya
Result	See § Aftermath

Belligerents
Home Army; Soviet partisans	Polesian Sich

Commanders and leaders
Władysław Kochański; Zdzisław Ostromęcki †; Franciszek Szafran	Petro Dolmatyuk; Ivan Mitrynga †

Strength
Unknown	Unknown

Casualties and losses
18–23 killed 2 wounded	8 killed 15 wounded

The Battle of Vilya was an armed clash that took place on 6 September 1943 in the village of Vilya in Volhynia, between a detachment of the Home Army and a group of Soviet partisans made up of Poles and a detachment of the Polesian Sich.

== Prelude ==
The village of Vilya, where a strong UPA outpost was located in 1943, was a base for attacks on Polish settlements, including Niemilia (Ludwipol municipality). On 4 September 1943, a fight took place with armed Ukrainians while harvesting grain from the surrounding fields for Polish refugees and partisans gathered in the area of Huta Stara (Ludwipol municipality). The clash took place in the area of the destroyed Ukrainian village of Vilya, which was pacified on 28 May 1943 by the German garrison from Bystrzyce.

== Battle ==
On 6 September 1943, two sotnias and a staff group of the Polesian Sich stationed in the devastated village of Vilya in Volhynia (Ludwipol commune in the Kostopol district) came into accidental contact with a detachment of the Home Army and a Felix Dzerzhinsky detachment of Polish communist partisans, who were guarding a grain haul. The Home Army part of the group was commanded by Lieutenant Zdzisław Ostromęcki "Podkowa". The commander of the communist part was platoon leader Franciszek Szafran. In total, the Polish forces initially numbered around 40 armed men.

Both sides, surprised by the encounter, engaged in a battle in which the weaker Polish side initially suffered losses of 16 men. Władysław and Ewa Siemaszek report that the tide of the battle was turned by the arrival of reinforcements from a Soviet unit and a Home Army unit under Władyslaw Kochański, pseud. "Bomba".

== Aftermath ==
Sources differ on result of the battle and number of losses. According to Władysław and Ewa Siemaszek, the Ukrainian unit was smashed and pushed out of the Vilya, with Polish losses amounting to 18 killed; among others, Second Lieutenant Ostromęcki was killed. However, according to Grzegorz Motyka, Polish partisans retreated and lost a total of 23 men in the clashes that lasted all day. On the Ukrainian side, heavy losses were also reported: 8 killed, including Ivan Mitringa, and 15 wounded.

== Bibliography ==
- Siemaszko, Władysław; Siemaszko, Ewa (2000). Ludobójstwo dokonane przez nacjonalistów ukraińskich na ludności polskiej Wołynia 1939-1945 [Genocide committed by Ukrainian nationalists on the Polish population of Volhynia] (in Polish). Warsaw: Von Borowiecky. ISBN 83-87689-34-3.
- Motyka, Grzegorz (2022). From the Volhynian Massacre to Operation Vistula. Brill U Schoningh. ISBN 978-3506795373.
