= Prus =

Surname

Prus is a surname. Notable people with the surname include:

- Albert Prus (born 1987), Russian footballer
- Bolesław Prus (1847–1912), Polish writer
- Edward Prus (1931–2007), Polish politologist
- Elena Prus (born 1986), Ukrainian badminton player
- Gunter Prus (13th century), Polish bishop
- Łucja Prus (1942–2002), Polish singer
- Mateusz Prus (born 1990), Polish footballer
- Michael Prus (born 1968), German football coach and former player

== See also ==
- Prus II Wilczekosy coat of arms
- Prus III coat of arms
