= Olevsk =

City in Zhytomyr Oblast, Ukraine

Olevsk Олевськ
- City
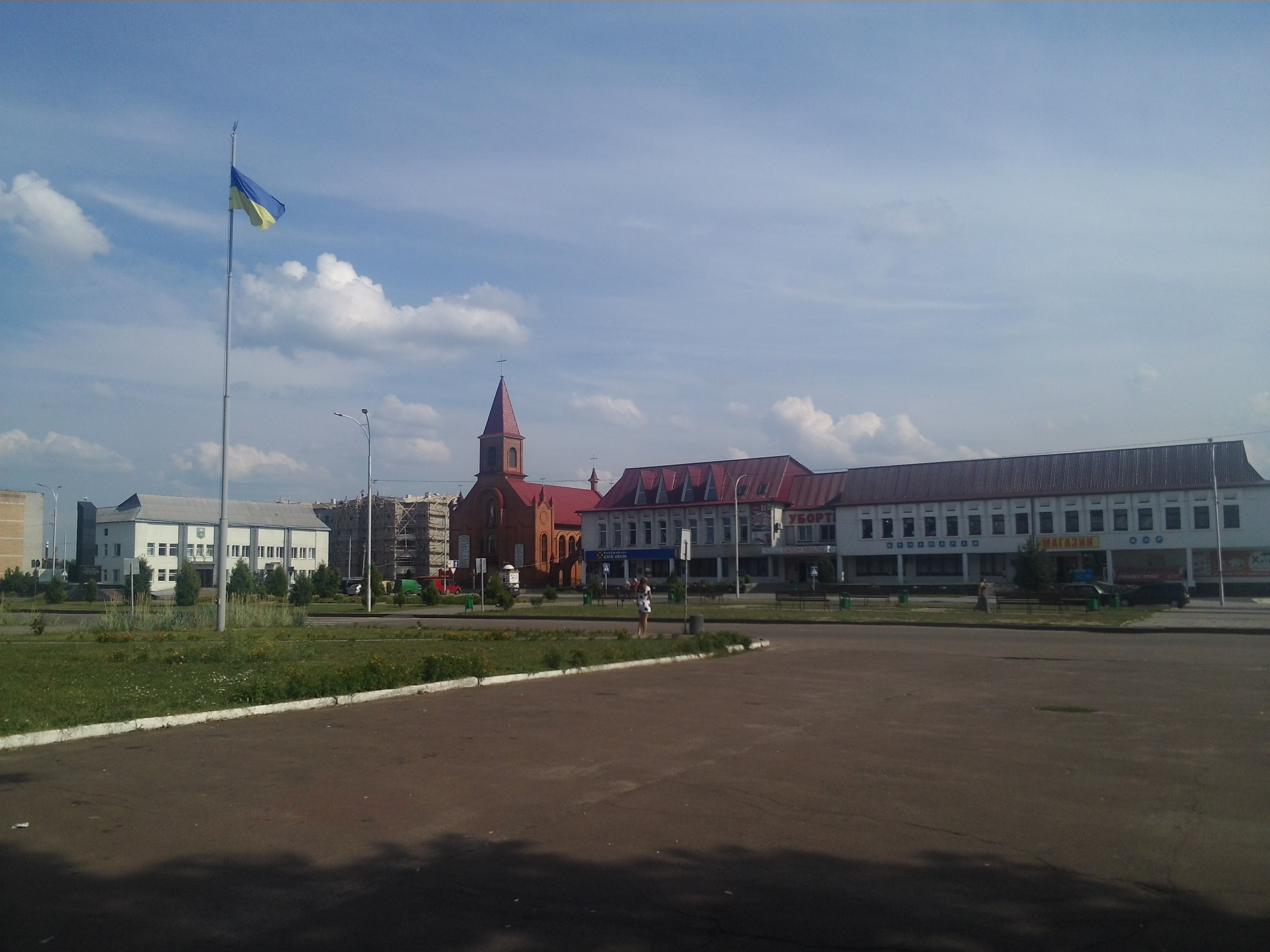
- Downtown Olevsk

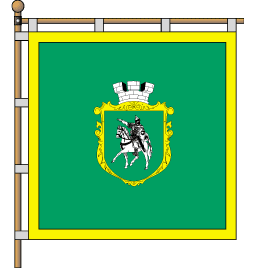
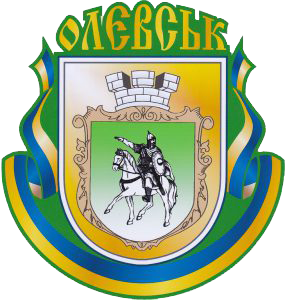
- Flag Coat of arms

- Location within Zhytomyr Oblast Location within Ukraine
- Coordinates: 51°13′N 27°39′E
- Country: Ukraine
- Oblast: Zhytomyr Oblast
- Raion: Korosten Raion
- Hromada: Olevsk urban hromada

Population (2022)
  - Total: 10,032
- Time zone: UTC+2 (EET)
  - Summer (DST): UTC+3 (EEST)

Olevsk (Ukrainian: Олевськ, IPA: [oˈlɛu̯sʲk]; Polish: Olewsk; Yiddish: אלעווסק) is a city in Korosten Raion, Zhytomyr Oblast, Ukraine, administrative center of Olevsk urban hromada. As of January 2022 its population was approximately 10,032. Olevsk is located in Zhytomyr Polissya.

== History ==
Historical affiliations
- Grand Duchy of Lithuania (1488–1569)
- Polish–Lithuanian Commonwealth (1569–1793)
- Russian Empire (1793–1917)
- Ukrainian People's Republic (1917–1918)
- Ukrainian State (1918)
- Ukrainian People's Republic (1918–1919)
- Republic of Poland (1919–1920)
- Soviet Ukraine (1920–1922)
- Soviet Union (1922–1991)
- Nazi Germany (1941–1944) (occupation)
- Ukraine (1991–present)

Olevsk was first mentioned in 1488. In 1641 Olevsk was granted Magdeburg city rights by Polish King Władysław IV Vasa. Later it became a town in Volhynian Governorate of the Russian Empire.

During World War II on November 15 or 21, 1941, members of Taras Bulba-Borovets' Ukrainian People's Revolutionary Army collaborated with the German administration in taking more than 500 Jews from Olevsk to Varvarivka, where they were murdered.

On December 25, 2011, the city council of Olevsk renamed the streets of the city that bore the names of Soviet leaders, naming them in honor of prominent figures of the Ukrainian nationalist and patriotic movement. The streets and lanes named after Pavel Postyshev, Stanislav Kosior, Hryhoriy Petrovsky, Mikhail Kalinin, and Hryhoriy Kotovsky were renamed. Instead, they were named after Olena Teliha, Oleh Olzhych, Hetman Vyhovsky, Oleksiy Opanasiuk, Heroes of Kruty, the 20th anniversary of Ukraine's independence, and Yuriy Tiutiunnyk.

== Geography ==
Olevsk is located in the north-west of Korosten District of Zhytomyr Oblast, 180 km from the regional center. The city is located on the Polesian Lowland, in Zhytomyr Polissya . Mixed forests, swamps and lakes occur around the city. Pine, hornbeam and oak are most often found in the forests. The city is located on the right bank of the Pripyat River, a right tributary of the Dnieper River. The climate of the territory is moderately continental, with humid summers and mild winters. The average annual temperature is about 10 °C, the average temperature in January is 4-5 °C, and in July it is about + 20 °C. The annual amount of precipitation is 570 mm. The European highway E373 passes south of Olevsk.

== Gallery ==
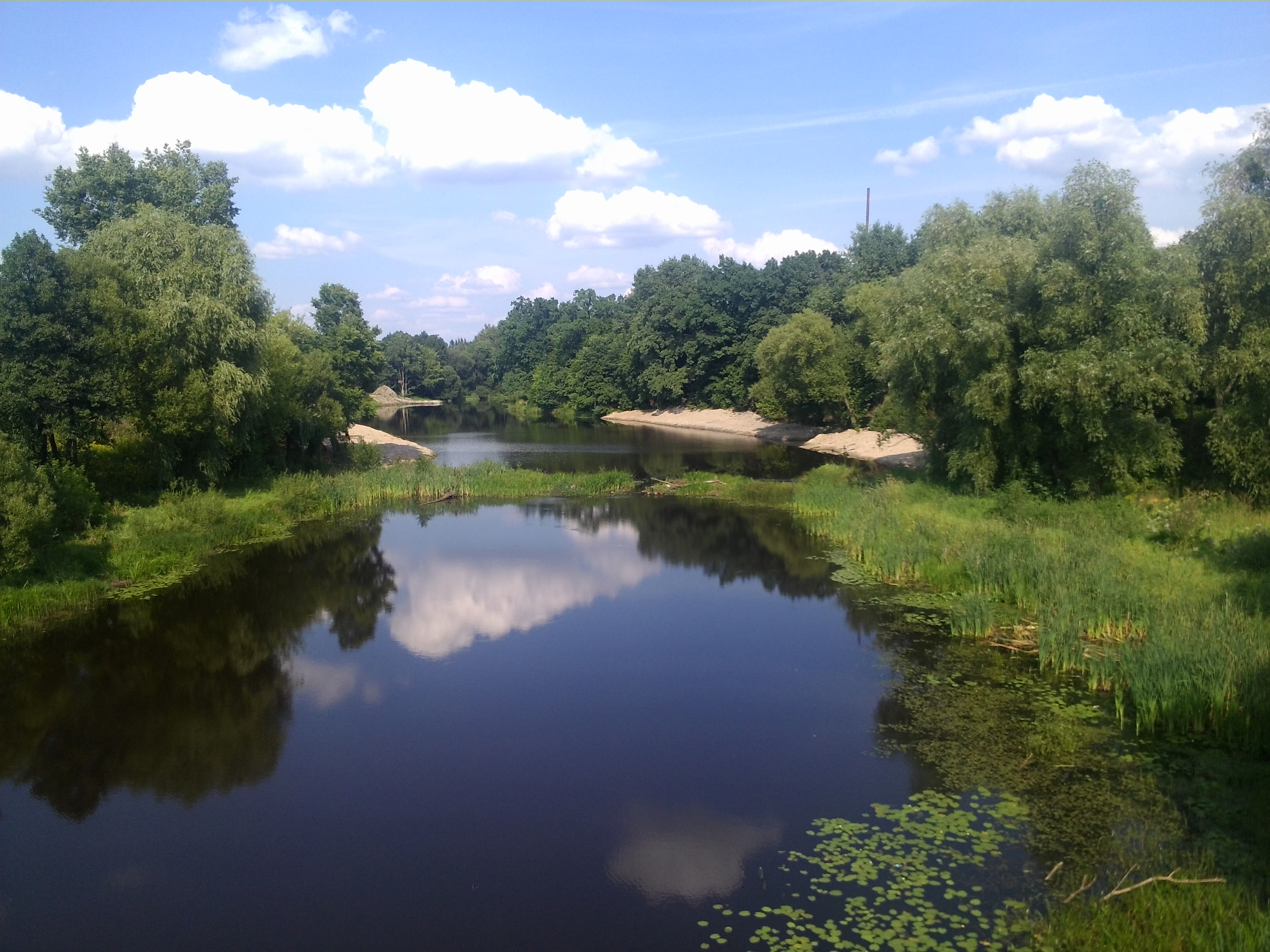
Ubort River in Olevsk

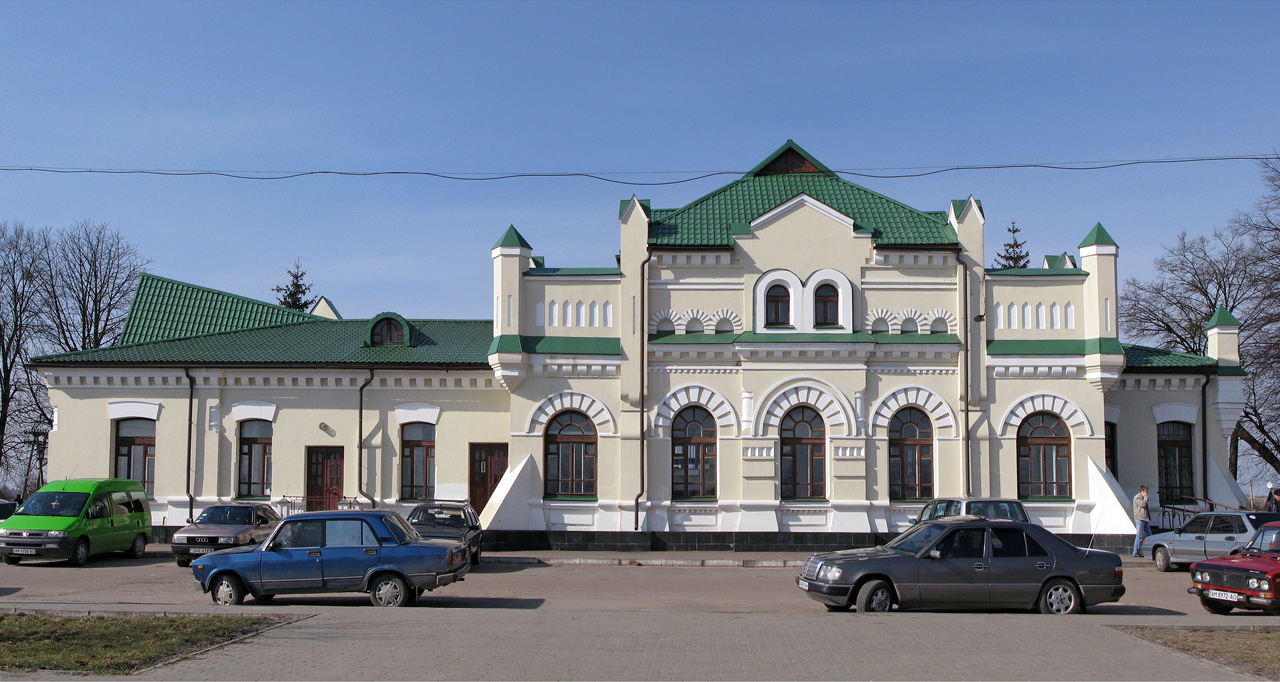
Olevsk railway station

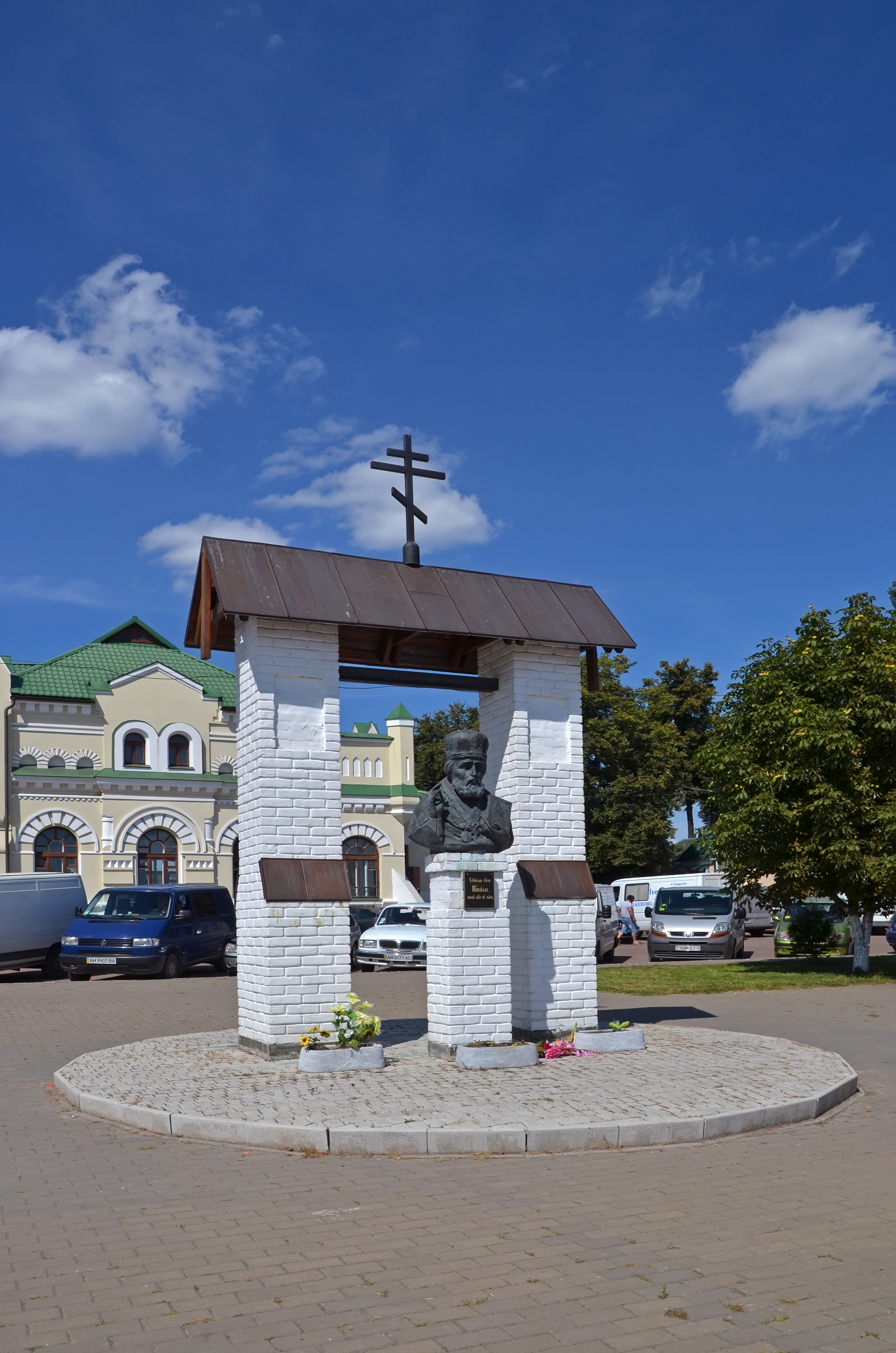
Saint Nicholas monument

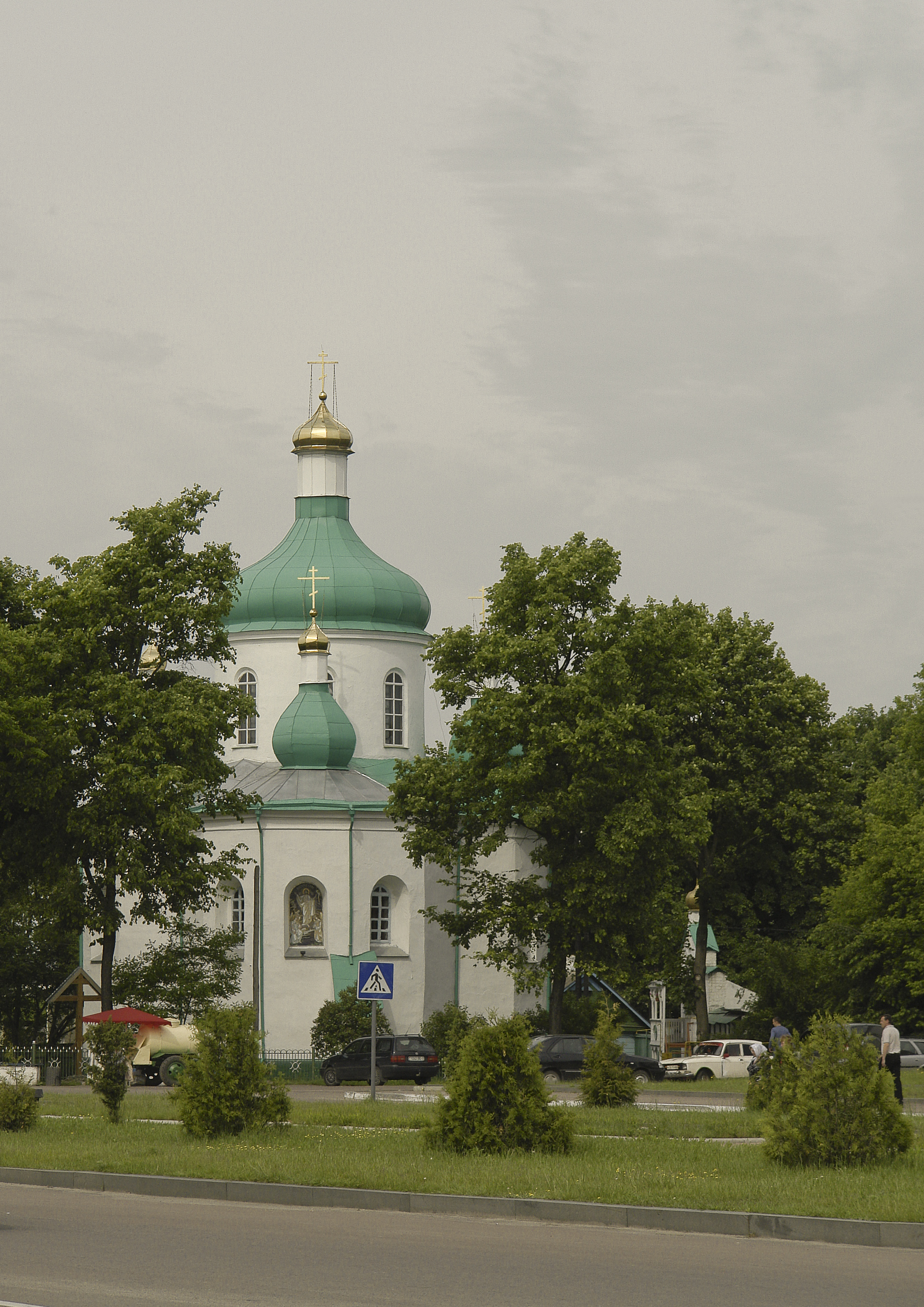
St. Nicholas Church
