= Adamy massacre =

Adamy
- Village (no longer existing)
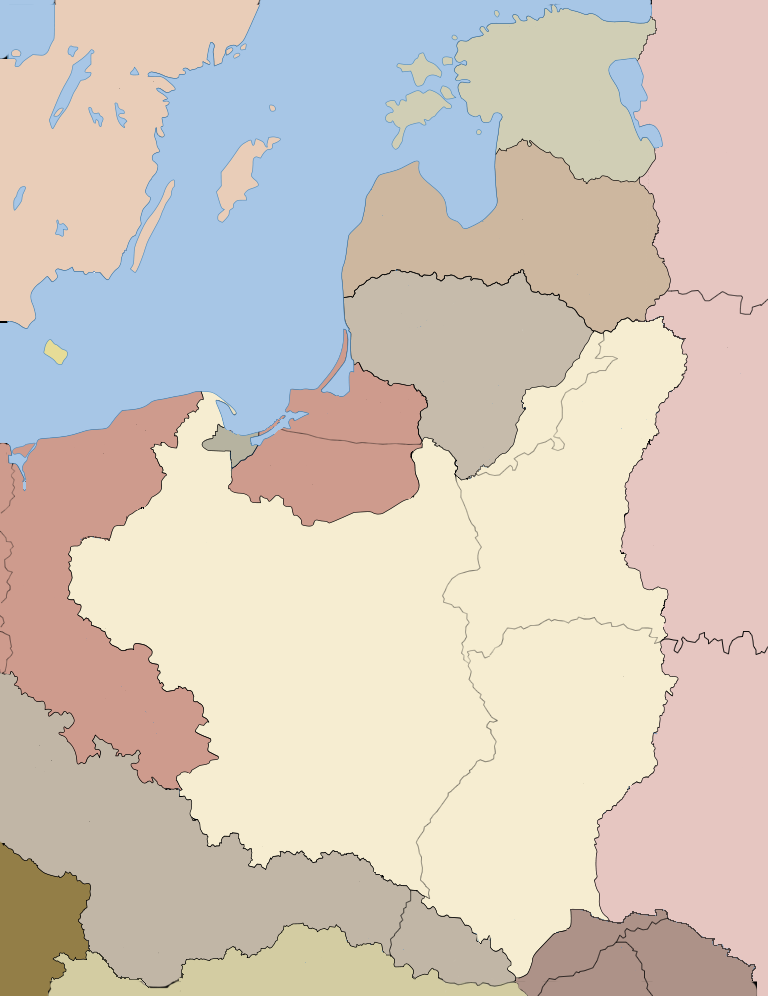
- Location of Adamy on the map of interwar Poland (1918–1939) prior to the Nazi-Soviet invasion of 1939 and the UPA ethnic cleansig
- Country: (Poland) Second Polish Republic
- Voivodeship: Tarnopol Voivodeship
- County: Kamionka Strumiłowa (pl)
- Population: 688 (circa 1879–1880)
- Coordinates: 49°58′N 24°38′E

The village of Adamy was burned to the ground during the Massacres of Poles in Volhynia and Eastern Galicia, and no longer exists. It was destroyed by the Ukrainian Insurgent Army aided by the Ukrainian peasants who set ablaze 200 Polish farms and murdered whomever they could find. Adamy was located in powiat Kamionka Strumiłowa (county) near Busk in the Tarnopol Voivodeship (woj. tarnopolskie) of the Second Polish Republic before the Nazi-Soviet invasion of Poland in 1939.

== The massacre ==
According to the eye-witness account of Weronika Szeremeta-Furmaniewicz who lived in Adamy during the Massacres of Poles in Volhynia and testified at the 1969 trial, the village was attacked several times by the OUN-UPA death squads, although unsuccessfully, because the Polish self-defence unit in Adamy was well armed. Their weapons included a crate of grenades left behind by the Polish Army in 1939. The Ukrainian raids were so persistent that eventually, most inhabitants decided to escape west ahead of the Soviet advance. In March and April 1944 boarded a train under a watchful eye of the German authorities. However, not all villagers left. Several families stayed behind including the family of Feliks Szeremeta.

The final OUN-UPA attack on Adamy took place behind the Soviet-German front, when the Red Army was already stationing in the area. The Adamy village was destroyed by the SB unit of UPA. All 200 houses were set ablaze. Among the attackers led by Dmitry Kupiak (uk) nicknamed "Klei" (or "Klej", meaning "glue") was a local band of Ukrainian peasants including women whose singing could be heard from a distance. The village, already depopulated, burned for a whole day until nighttime. The survivors, hidden in the woods, run to Busk and asked the Russians for help. On the second day, the Soviet NKVD sent three tanks to Adamy but encountered only the smouldering ashes and nothing else. Six bodies of murdered Poles were found, including Franciszka Szeremeta, Maria Święs, Teodor Łucek, Adam Brodziak, Jan Dąbrowski, Antoni Młot and Emilian Łukasiewicz.

== War criminal in Canada ==
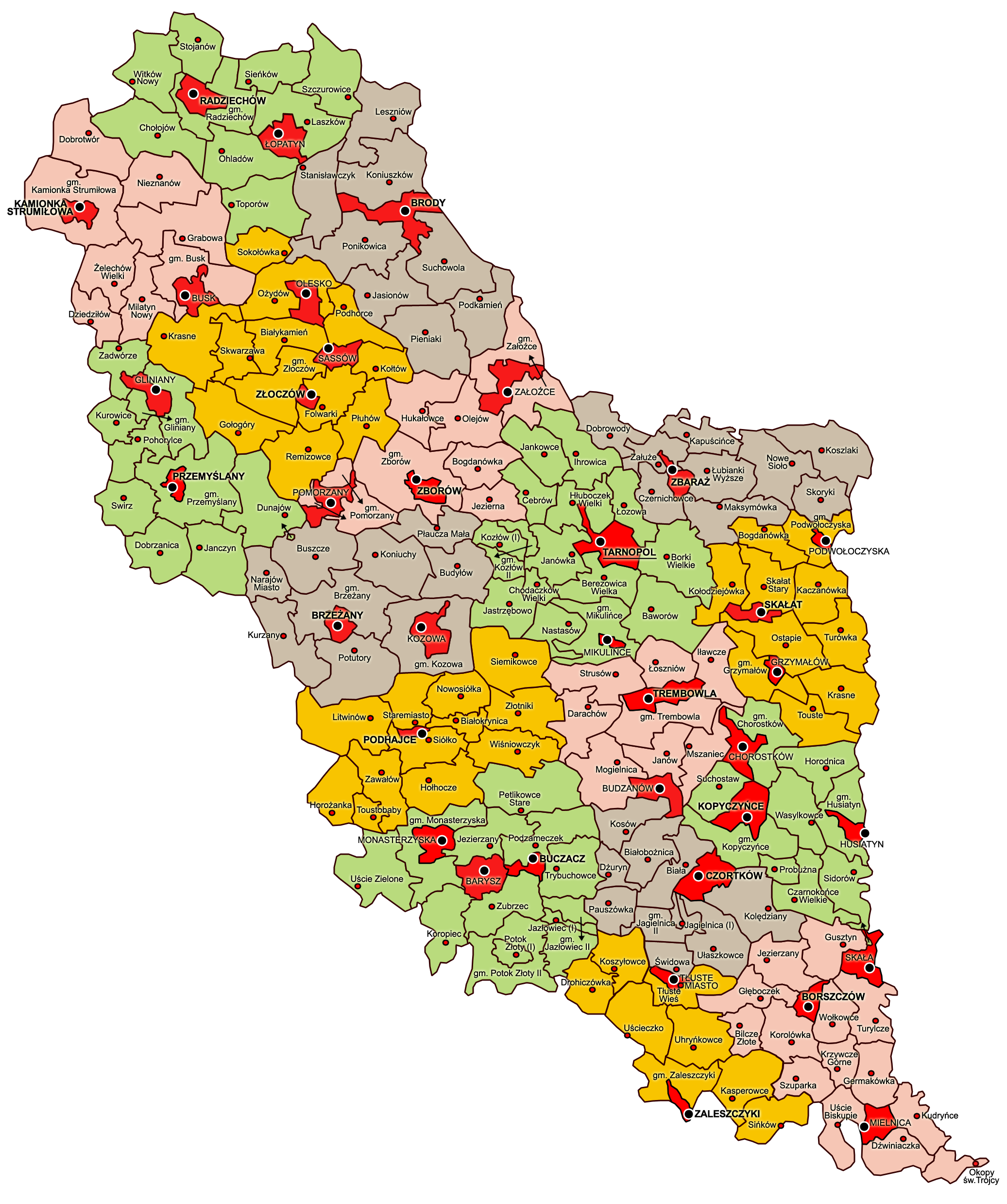
Location of powiat Kamionka Strumiłowa (county) in Tarnopol Voivodeship (woj. tarnopolskie) of the Second Polish Republic with neighbouring administrative centres under attack by the SB units of UPA

The commander of the SB OUN-UPA death squad in charge of the annihilation of Adamy, Dmitry (Dymitr, in Polish) Kupiak (who operated under the pseudonym Sławko Weslar in the Nazi German Distrikt Galizien), after the war emigrated to Canada, under the name Dmytro Kupyak. His five co-conspirators were tried in October 1969 by the Lviv District Court in Soviet Ukraine and sentenced to 15 years of hard labour. Kupyak "Klei" published his own memories in a book called Spohady nerostrilanoho (Memoirs of an Unshot), Toronto 1991, in Ukrainian. Kupyak (born in 1918) died on 13 June 1995 in Toronto. His war crimes' investigation by the Canadian Department of Justice was subsequently terminated. Dymitr Kupiak is the subject of a monograph written by Bronisław Szeremeta, who revealed that "Klei" commanded a death squad of local bandits who engaged in a string of robberies and torture-murder operations targeting ethnic Poles, Polish Jews, as well as ethnic Ukrainians in the area between Lwów and Tarnopol, notably in the settlements of Milatyn Nowy and Stary, Busk, Grabowa, Pobużany, Jabłonówka, Kupcze, Nowosiółka, Żeniów, Bogdanówka, Wodaje, Wierzblany, Zabłotne, Czanyż and others. In almost all of the above locations dozens of his victims were tortured, dismembered alive and burnt to death. A second book featuring Dmytro Kupyak as war criminal wanted in the Soviet Union, was written by Prof. James McKenzie of University of Regina under the title War Criminals in Canada (1995), published by Detselig Enterprises of Calgary. Kupyak is celebrated in Ukraine (as Дмитро Куп'як). A school was named after him in Yabluniv, with a memorial plaque put on display.

== See also ==
- Historiography of the Volyn tragedy
