= Kołodyński =

Kołodyński (feminine: Kołodyńska) is a Polish surname. May refer to:

- Andrzej Kołodyński
- Czesław Kołodyński
- Dorota Kołodyńska
- Jan Kołodyński
- Jana Kolodynska
- Marcin Kołodyński
- Witold Kołodyński
