= Hryhorii Perehinyak =

Ukrainian nationalist (1910 - 1943)

Hryhorii Pereghinyak
- Григорій Перегіняк
- Born: February 7, 1910; Staryi Uhryniv
- Died: February 22, 1943 (aged 33); Vysotsk
- Military career
- Allegiance: Germany, Ukrainian Auxiliary Police (until 1942); Ukrainian Insurgent Army
- Branch: Paramilitary
- Service years: 1941–1943
- Nickname: Dowbeszka-Korobka
- Unit: Commander of a sotnia (company)
- Conflicts: World War Two; Eastern Front; Polish–Ukrainian conflict; Volhynian massacre; Parośla I massacre; Anti-German Ukrainian nationalist insurgency †; Attack on Volodymyrets

Hryhorii Perehinyak (Ukrainian: Григорій Перегіняк; February 7, 1910 - February 22, 1943) was a Ukrainian nationalist and member of the Organisation of Ukrainian Nationalists (OUN-B).

== Biography ==
He came from a peasant family. In 1935, he committed the murder of a Polish village head (sołtys) in his native village of Staryi Uhryniv, for which he was sentenced to life imprisonment. In prison, he met, among others, Stepan Bandera. In September 1939, he was released from prison and joined the organization founded by Stepan Bandera in Kraków. Shortly after completing an OUN training course, Perehijniak became a member of one of the Ukrainian sabotage groups created by the German army to conduct intelligence operations in Volhynia. He then joined the collaborationist Ukrainian Auxiliary Police, where he participated in the extermination of Jews.

In the fall of 1942, he deserted from the Ukrainian police units and joined the UPA, adopting the pseudonym "Dowbeszka-Korobka." On the orders of Ivan Lytvynchuk (pseud. "Dubovyi"), he formed a sotnia (company) in the Sarny district, whose main tasks were to fight Soviet partisans and eliminate the competing group of Ukrainian nationalists centered around the faction of Andriy Melnyk (OUN-M). This unit is considered the first sotnia of the Ukrainian Insurgent Army.

The first mass crime committed by Perehijniak was the massacre in Paroslia, which took place on February 9, 1943, which has subsequently been considered the beginning of the genocide in Volhynia. Even before the action in Paroslia, Perehijniak's sotnia launched an attack on a German police station in Volodymyrets, which was likely defended by a few to a dozen or so gendarmes (Germans and Cossacks). Ukrainian sources exaggerate the number of policemen defending the station, claiming that 63 gendarmes were killed in the clash with Perehijniak's sotnia, and 19 were taken prisoner.

He died on February 22, 1943, in Vysotsk, Volhynia, during a battle with the Nazi German army.
