= Józef Turowski =

Polish historian

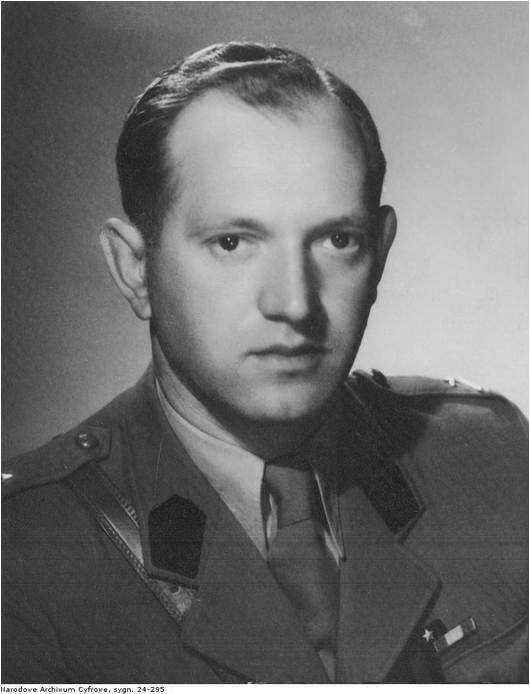
- nom de guerre: Ziuk
- Born: 1927
- Died: 24 July 1989 (aged 61–62); Warsaw

Józef Turowski (died 24 July 1989 in Warsaw, Poland) was a Polish military historian.

He authored two books, published in 1990: Pożoga: Walki 27 Wołyńskiej Dywizji AK (Conflagration: Battles of the Home Army's 27th Wołyń Division); and, with Władysław Siemaszko, Zbrodnie nacjonalistów ukraińskich dokonane na ludności polskiej na Wołyniu 1939-1945 (Crimes Committed by Ukrainian Nationalists against Wołyń's Polish Population, 1939–1945).

== Research ==
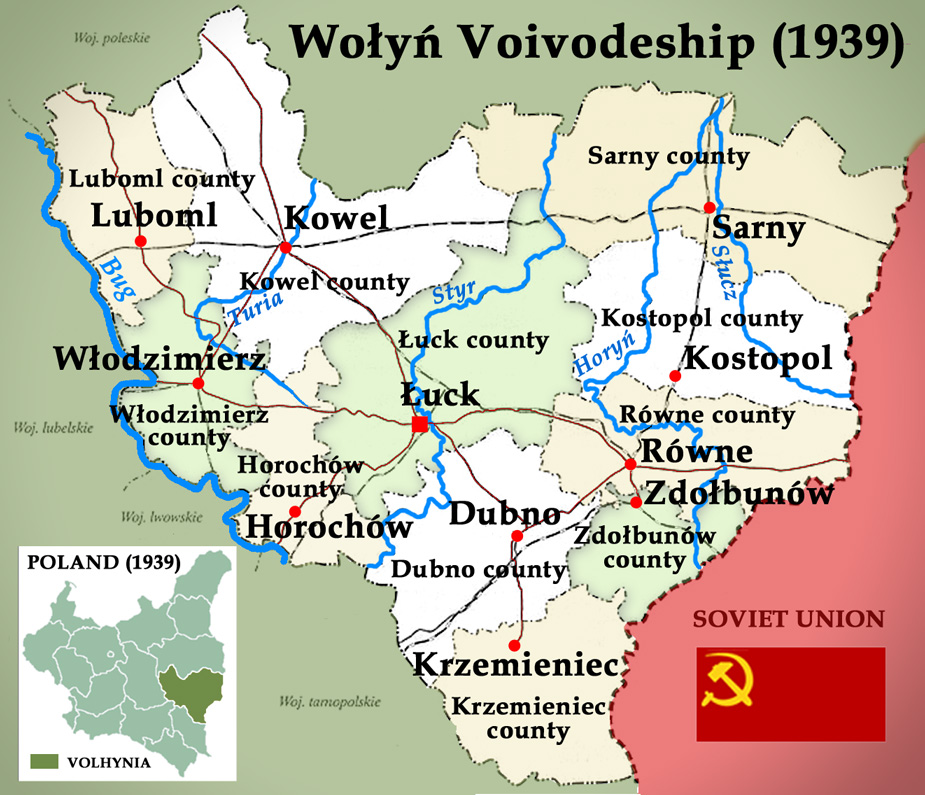
Wołyń Province, eastern Poland, 1939

Crimes Committed by Ukrainian Nationalists, written with the aid of researcher, lawyer, and former Home Army soldier Władysław Siemaszko, recounts the 1942–45 massacres of Poles in Poland's prewar Wołyń Province. It produced an avalanche of responses from massacre survivors and witnesses, providing additional facts about events and localities that had not been included in the original edition.

The book features the first chronological register of Ukrainian OUN and UPA attacks on the Polish population, giving dates, places, short descriptions of crimes committed, estimated numbers of victims and, where possible, their names. Most of the accounts are based on material gathered by Turowski for a memoir project begun in 1985 by Polish veterans of the Home Army's 27th Wołyń Division. About a thousand Wołyń localities are listed here for the first time.

This book was followed up by a much more extensively documented ten-year project of Władysław Siemaszko and his daughter, Ewa Siemaszko, Ludobójstwo dokonane przez nacjonalistów ukraińskich na ludności polskiej Wołynia 1939-1945 (Genocide Committed by Ukrainian Nationalists against the Polish Population of Wołyń, 1939–1945), Warsaw, 2000, 1433 pp., illustrated, ISBN 83-87689-34-3. The authors identified by name almost 20,000 victims of Ukrainian ethnic cleansing in only half of Wołyń's administrative units; the true losses of Polish civilians—men, women and children—were in excess of 60,000.

Józef Turowski, in his Conflagration, attempted to assess as well the extent of Jewish human losses in Wołyń.

== Works ==
- Pożoga: Walki 27 Wołyńskiej Dywizji AK (Conflagration: Battles of the Home Army's 27th Wołyń Division), Warsaw, Państwowe Wydawnictwo Naukowe, 1990, ISBN 978-83-01-08465-3, 597 pages, maps, over 70 photographs.
- with Władysław Siemaszko, Zbrodnie nacjonalistów ukraińskich dokonane na ludności polskiej na Wołyniu 1939-1945 (Crimes Committed by Ukrainian Nationalists against Wołyń's Polish Population, 1939–1945), Warsaw, Główna Komisja Badania Zbrodni Hitlerowskich w Polsce – Instytut Pamięci Narodowej, Środowisko Żołnierzy 27 Wołyńskiej Dywizji Armii Krajowej w Warszawie (Chief Commission for the Investigation of Nazi Crimes in Poland – the Institute of National Remembrance, and Association of Soldiers of the Home Army's 27th Wołyń Division in Warsaw.

== See also ==
- Soviet invasion of Poland
