= Wiktor Poliszczuk =

Polish-Ukrainian-Canadian political scientist (1925–2008)

- Wiktor Poliszczuk
- Born: 10 October 1925; Dubno, Second Polish Republic
- Died: 17 November 2008 (aged 83); Toronto, Ontario, Canada
- Citizenship: Polish, Canadian
- Occupation: political scientist
- Known for: Polish-Ukrainian relations

Wiktor Poliszczuk (10 October 1925 – 17 November 2008) was a Polish-Ukrainian-Canadian political scientist specialising in the history of political thought, who wrote about the Polish-Ukrainian relations during World War II and issues relating to the emergence of Ukrainian nationalism in the 20th century resulting in a campaign of ethnic cleansing. Poliszczuk's work has been praised by several Polish, Canadian, American, and Ukrainian historians, but also acknowledged for his Polish-Ukrainian reconciliation effort.

== Biography ==
Poliszczuk was born in Dubno (then in the Second Polish Republic), into a family of Ukrainian father and Polish mother. He was raised as an Eastern Orthodox Christian. When he was a child Wiktor, his mother and two sisters were deported to Kazakh SSR by the Soviet authorities (in April 1940). His father (an ethnic Ukrainian who had served as government official in interwar Poland) was executed by the Soviets. After World War II his family resettled in Dnipropetrovsk and in 1946 moved to Poland following Polish-Soviet repatriation agreement, to re-unite with the family of his aunt. In Poland Poliszczuk graduated from the Pedagogical Liceum and worked as a teacher. Later he studied law at the Wrocław University, and political science at the University of Silesia in Katowice, where he obtained a PhD (his doctoral thesis was about the ideology of Ukrainian nationalism). He worked as an attorney in the People's Republic of Poland. In 1981 during the time of martial law in Poland he emigrated to Canada. He lived in Toronto until his death in November 2008.

== Work ==
Poliszczuk's research and his extensive writing were devoted to the anatomy of bolshevism, theory and practice of national rights in the former Soviet Union as well as the theory and practice of the Organization of Ukrainian Nationalists and the Ukrainian Insurgent Army activities. His on-line biography does not list any affiliations with a Canadian university. His two books, translated into English-language, were self-published in Toronto, Ontario, Canada, including: Legal and political assessment of the OUN and UPA, as well as Bitter truth : the criminality of the Organization of Ukrainian Nationalists (OUN) and the Ukrainian Insurgent Army (UPA).

Wiktor Poliszczuk was the author of over 200 papers, books and scientific publications, scientific articles, polemics, reviews, and press releases written in English, Ukrainian and Polish, including five large volumes bearing the title Integral Ukrainian nationalism as a variant of fascism (Toronto, 2003). His two books were translated into English-language. In his writing, Poliszczuk clearly separates the issues of the Ukrainian Insurgent Army and the Ukrainian nation, stating that the Organization of Ukrainian Nationalists was based on terror. He explores the sources of the Organization of Ukrainian Nationalists' actions as based on the theories of Dmytro Dontsov. On April 16, 2009, Wiktor Poliszczuk received posthumously the "Polonia Mater Nostra Est" award.

=== Analysis ===
Poliszczuk's main argument in his work on the history of Ukrainian nationalism was that it began only in the period following World War I. Poliszczuk postulated that the earlier political beliefs held by Ukrainian writers such as Mykola Mikhnovsky were oriented toward independence and did not have the same radical character of Dmytro Dontsov's ideology which served as inspiration for the World War II atrocities committed by the Organization of Ukrainian Nationalists. According to Poliszczuk – wrote Dr Anna Dziduszko-Rościszewska of the Jagiellonian University – the main difference among the ideas of Mikhnovsky and Dontsov was the actual definition of a nation. For Mikhnovsky, the reform of the existing social order did not preclude the commitment to the ideal of tolerance, wrote Poliszczuk. For Dontsov, on the other hand, violence and intolerance became the necessary ingredients of the new Ukrainian nationalism providing the vocabulary of motive for the massacres of Poles in Volhynia and Eastern Galicia in the following years.

== Criticism ==
Wiktor Poliszczuk was criticised as biased against OUN-UPA and nonscientific by several historians. Polish historian Rafał Wnuk of the Institute of National Remembrance in Lublin categorized Poliszczuk's work as belonging to the "para-scientific" tradition. Although Poliszczuk was described by Wnuk as a "left-wing democrat" (quotes provided by Wnuk), he was said by Wnuk to have used the same jargon and to have reached the same conclusions as the Polish national nonscientific writers. Ukrainian academic Yaroslav Isayevich of the National Academy of Sciences of Ukraine called Poliszczuk an "expert practitioner of anti-Ukrainian hysteria." Canadian historian David Marples described Poliszczuk's work as detailed, although taking the form of a polemic similar to the views regarding UPA from the Soviet perspective to which Poliszczuk's work can be added. In an interview published in translation by the Warsaw-based Ukrainian newspaper Our Word (Нашe Слово), Polish historian Ryszard Torzecki dismissed Poliszczuk as an "NKVD prosecutor" and one of the named writers unworthy of discussion.

Ukrainian nationalist historians also condemned Poliszczuk's works. For example, Volodomyr Serhiichuk of Ukraine published an entire book in response to his writing, defending OUN-UPA and claiming the Polish community's alleged collaboration with the Germans and with the Bolsheviks. However, the aforementioned book also "denigrates the Poles at every opportunity; it is thus a diatribe – wrote Marples – rather than an academic work..." (Heroes and Villains). Poliszczuk was a "left-wing democrat" who fully supported Operation Vistula, wrote Rafal Wnuk (referring to the forced deportation of the Ukrainian community from eastern Poland after the assassination of Communist minister Karol Świerczewski there); however, any attempts at his work's classification "using a national key" (suggested by Motyka) would be the least convincing. Historian of Ukraine Timothy Snyder wrote that Poliszczuk's argument about the purpose of resettlement was his "blatant" mistake, because this action was undertaken in order to disperse Ukrainian communities so they "could never arise again in Poland". The purported removal of the civilian base from the Ukrainian Insurgent Army after the war was only a pretext used by the authorities in Operation "Wisla".

== Publications ==
- Viktor Polishchuk, Legal and political assessment of the OUN and UPA, Toronto, 1997, 173 pages, ISBN 0-9699444-4-6
- Viktor Polishchuk, Bitter truth: The criminality of the Organization of Ukrainian Nationalists (OUN) and the Ukrainian Insurgent Army (UPA), the testimony of a Ukrainian, 403 pages, ISBN 0-9699444-9-7
- Dowody zbrodni OUN i UPA (Proofs of OUN and UPA's crimes) (in Polish)
- Gorzka prawda (Bitter truth) (in Polish and English)
- Ideologia nacjonalizmu ukraińskiego (Ideology of Ukrainian nationalism) (in Polish)
- Apokalipsa według Wiktora Ukrainca (Apocalipse according to a greater Ukrainian) (in Polish)
- Fałszowanie historii najnowszej Ukrainy (Falsifying of the modern history of Ukraine) (in Polish)
- Ocena polityczna i prawna OUN i UPA (Political and legal judgement of OUN and UPA) (in Polish)
- Akcja Wisła - próba oceny (Action Vistula - an attempt to evaluate) (in Polish)
- Zginęli z rąk ukraińskich (They died from Ukrainian hands) (in Polish)
- Pojęcie integralnego nacjonalizmu ukraińskiego (Notion of the integral Ukrainian nationalism) (in Polish)
- Ukraińskie ofiary OUN-UPA (Ukrainian victims of OUN-UPA) Excerpts available in English at Lemko.org (in Polish)
- Integralny nacjonalizm ukraiński jako odmiana faszyzmu (Integral Ukrainian nationalism as a variety of fascism) (in Polish)
- Działalność ukraińskich struktur nacjonalistycznych w latach 1920-1999 (in Polish, English, and Ukrainian)
