= Shepetivka operation =

Shepetivka Operation
- Part of the Eastern Front of World War II
Date	19 August 1942
Location	Shepetivka, Shepetivka Raion, Khmelnytskyi Oblast
Result	Ukrainian victory

Belligerents
(Ukraine) Polissian Sich	Germany; Hungary

Commanders and leaders
(Ukraine) Taras Bulba-Borovets	Maj. Gen. Halterman

Strength
Unknown	Unknown

Casualties and losses
Unknown	Heavy: 4 trains captured

The Shepetivka Operation was a major sabotage action carried out by the units of Polissian Sich against Nazi Germany on August 19, 1942.

== Prelude ==
In late April of 1942, Taras Bulba-Borovets led Polissian Sich operations against Nazi Germany. Bulba conducted propaganda campaign across Right-Bank Ukraine and targeted gestapo detachments, with the goal of pressuring Erich Koch to stop repressions against the Ukrainian population. However, Koch ignored Bulba’s demands and only increased the repressions. This prompted Bulba to launch a major sabotage operation with demonstrative nature, entering what he himself called the second phase of resistance.

== Operation ==
Unlike in the first phase of anti-German resistance in April and May, partisans now intended to strike transport of military-strategic importance. Detailed description of operation comes from two Ukrainian commanders that took part in it. According to them, the operation was done silently and meant to avoid major battles, while also cutting off communications. Main blow was aimed at SS and gestapo units, while Wehrmacht troops were only required to be locked up after disarming.

As the activity of partisans became known to "SS Brigadeführer Major General Halterman", he had trouble requsting nearby units to stop the partisans. Available auxiliary police units couldn't be entrusted with this task, due to risk of defection. During this time, train station was overrun by "several thousand" partisans.

Later, German command managed to send out available nearby Hungarian units, to whom they were able to entrust the taks of fighting Ukrainian partisans. However, by the time Hungarian units arrived, the partisans already completed their sabotage actions and left with all the loot.

== Aftermath ==
As a result of operation, Erich Koch was now willing to negotiate with Taras Bulba-Borovets and his partisans. Western Ukrainian insurgents seized 4 trains, releasing people sent to forced labour from another 2 trains.

Shepetivka became Bulba’s most famous action. Even the Soviet author Polykarp Shafet was compelled to comment on the operation: "Ataman Bulba dared to attack commodity in Shepetivka, and fought Magyars [Hungarians], which he declared as 'military-strategic struggle of Ukraine'".

== Bibliography ==
- Borovets, Taras (1981). Бульба-Боровець Т. Армія без держави: слава і трагедія українського повстанського руху (in Ukrainian). Інститут Дослідів Волині ч. 45 Накладом Товариства “Волинь”. ISBN 978-966-2186-15-4.
