= Stara Huta, Volyn Oblast =

Village in Volyn Oblast, Ukraine

Stara Huta Стара Гута
- Village
- Location within Volyn Oblast Location within Ukraine
- Coordinates: 51.4119°N 24.2436°E
- Country: Ukraine
- Oblast: Volyn Oblast
- Raion: Kovel Raion

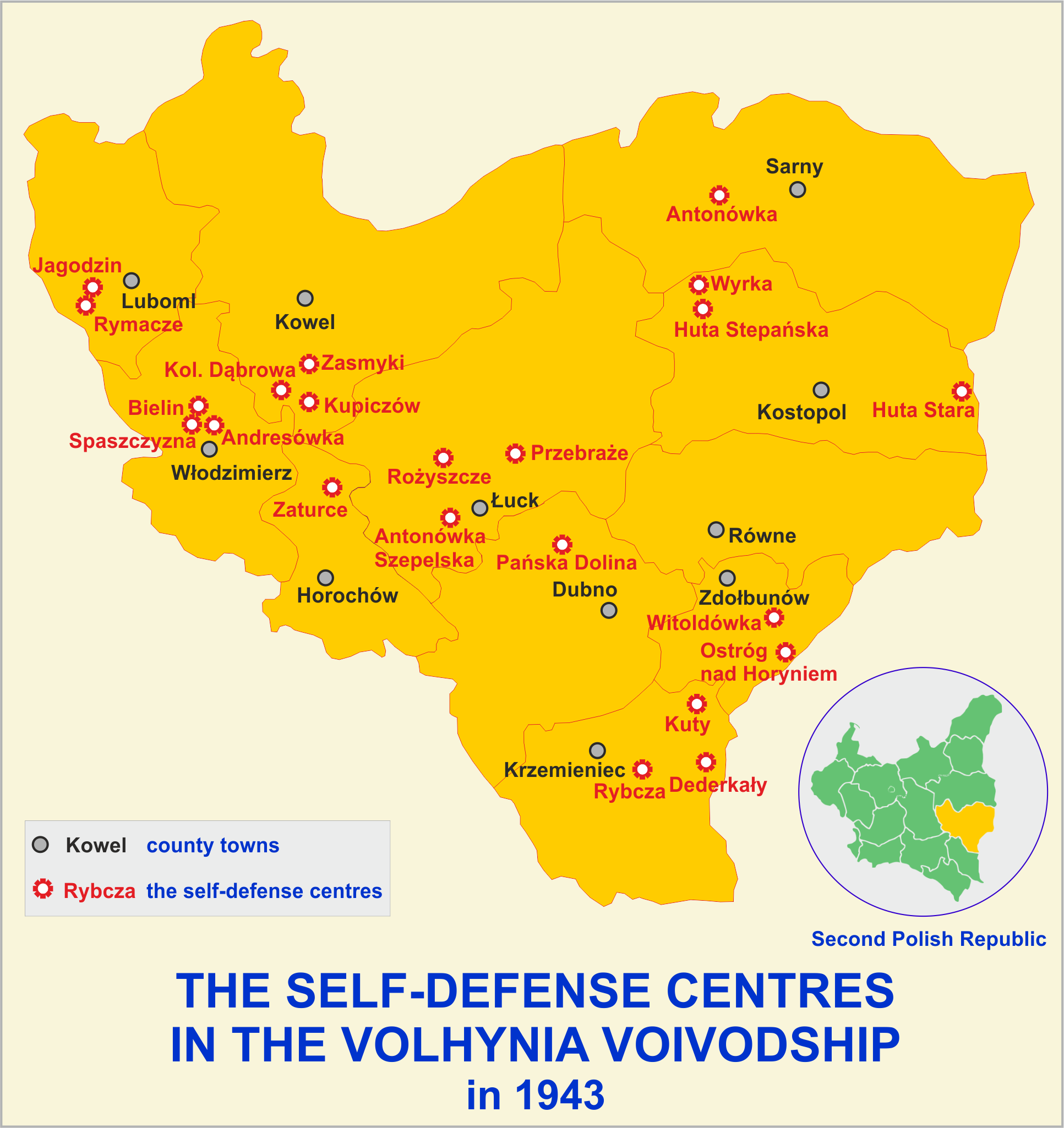
The self-defense centres in the Volhynia Voivodship in 1943

Stara Huta (Ukrainian: Стара Гута) is a village in northwestern Ukraine, in Kovel Raion of Volyn Oblast, but was formerly administered within Stara Vyzhivka Raion. The population of the village is 1024 people.

== History ==
Between the wars, the village was located in the Second Polish Republic, in the Kostopol County, Volhynia Voivodeship. Up till the Nazi German and Soviet invasions of Poland in September 1939 it was known as Stara Huta. During World War II, the village was the site of Polish and Jewish mass murders between 1942 and 1945, perpetrated by local Ukrainian peasants and the Ukrainian Insurgent Army.

== Defense of Huta Stara in 1943 ==
The first attack on the self-defence centre in Huta Stara was launched by the Ukrainian Insurgent Army at the beginning of June 1943.

On 7 July 1943, the centre lost Lt. Osiecki, who was kidnapped and murdered by Soviet partisans from the grouping of NKVD Colonel Dmitry Medvedev. The loss of command resulted in the partial dispersal of the self-defence and the seizure of some of its members by Soviet partisans, although the seized people, being part of the Dzerzhinsky unit, still performed self-defence tasks.

On 15 August 1943, a 200-strong partisan detachment of the Home Army (AK), led by Lieutenant Władysław Kochański "Bomba", arrived in Huta Stara and joined the self-defence, staying there until December 1943.

On 16 November 1943, taking advantage of the absence in the village of the "Bomba" detachment, which had set out on an action against the Germans, UPA units of about 1,200 men attacked the self-defence centre from the east. Heavy fighting continued throughout the day. The balance of power was altered by the return of the "Bomba" unit, which hit the Ukrainians in the vicinity of Moczulanka, and the attack on the UPA units by Soviet partisans under the command of Capt. Kotlarov. Smashed and dispersed, the UPA lost 54 killed and about 40 wounded. On the Polish side, some people were killed. It was one of the greatest Polish successes in their fight against the UPA.

== After the Defense ==
The second "pacification" operation took place on 28 February 1945 and this time, the Ukrainians killed all the Poles they encountered, including infants and seniors. At that time, the village was destroyed completely and the remaining inhabitants murdered. Among the murdered were four female members of the Biernacki family; the males had been murdered on 4 March 1944. A local Roman Catholic church, had also been razed. The Ukrainians were led by Pavlo Kirychuk, a member of the OUN(B), who himself was later shot by the UIA for desertion.

== Sources ==
- (in Polish) Isakowicz-Zaleski, Tadeusz. Annihilation of Korosciatyn, kki.pl; accessed 13 December 2014.
- (in Polish) Stankiewicz, Janusz. Huta Stara, stankiewicze.com, 2007; accessed 13 December 2014.

== See also ==
- Massacres of Poles in Volhynia
