= Taras Bulba-Borovets =

Ukrainian Axis collaborator and resistance leader

- Тарас Бульба-Боровець
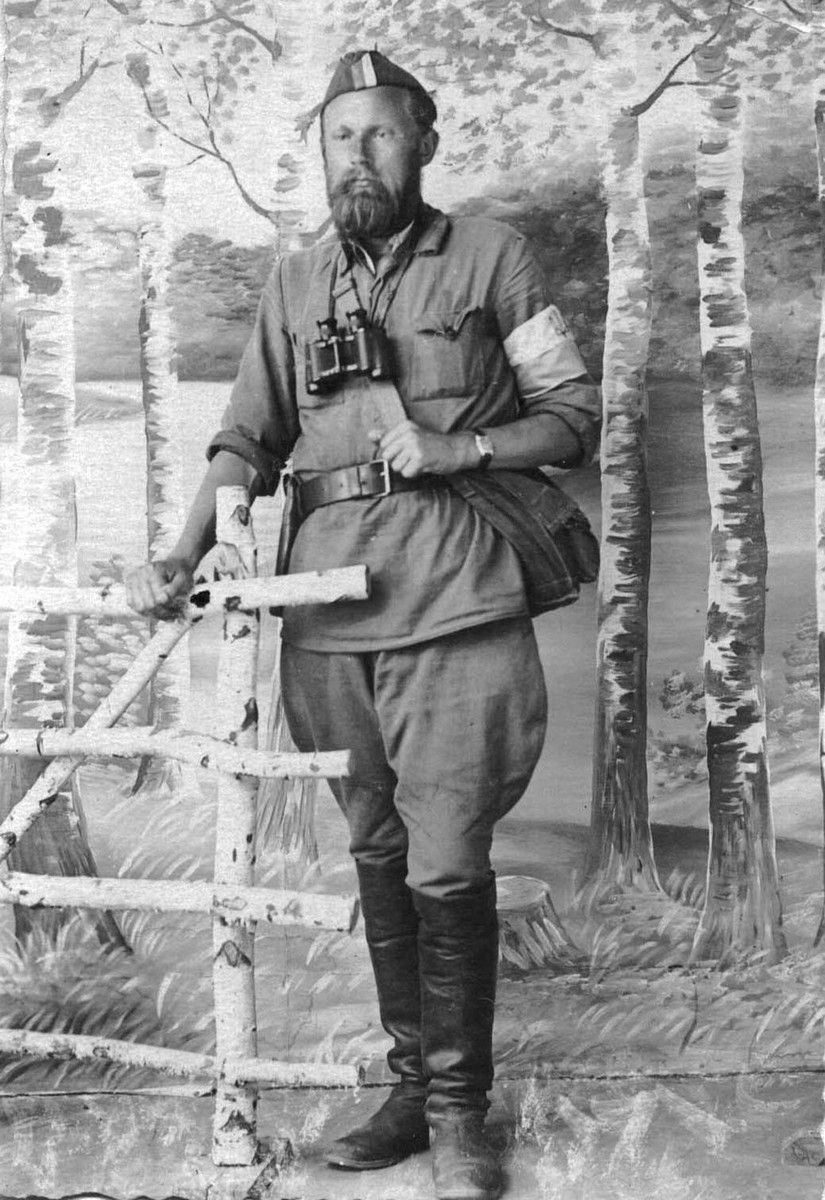
- Bulba-Borovets in 1941
- Born: March 9, 1908; Rovensky Uyezd, Volhynian Governorate, Russian Empire
- Died: May 15, 1981 (aged 73); New York City, U.S.
- Known for: Ukrainian nationalist leader

Taras Dmytrovych Borovets (Ukrainian: Тарас Дмитрович Боровець; March 9, 1908 – May 15, 1981) was a Ukrainian nationalist commander during World War II who founded and led the Polissian Sich partisan group, which was later renamed the Ukrainian People's Revolutionary Army (UPRA). His forces initially collaborated with German forces against the Soviet Union at the start of the German invasion, but later entered into conflict with them.

He adopted the nom de guerre Taras Bulba and is commonly known as Taras Bulba-Borovets. The pseudonym was taken from the protagonist of the eponymous novel by Nikolai Gogol, a Ukrainian-born writer of the Russian literary tradition.

== Early years ==
Borovets was born in the village of Bystrychi, in the subdivision Rovensky Uyezd of the Volhynia Governorate, part of the Russian Empire. According to some Polish police documents of the period, his first name was Maksym. As a result of the 1921 Treaty of Riga, the part of Volhynia Borovets lived in was incorporated into the Second Polish Republic.

In his memoirs, Borovets claimed that from 1933 he worked for the government-in-exile of the Ukrainian People's Republic (UNR) and carried out illegal missions in the Soviet Union. Polish police documents from the same year, however, identify him as the head of a local cell of the Organization of Ukrainian Nationalists (OUN). In 1934, following the OUN's assassination of Polish interior minister Bronisław Pieracki, Borovets was arrested and sentenced to three years in the Bereza Kartuska Detention Camp. He was released in 1935; while the official reason was good behavior, some historians suggest his release was facilitated by German intelligence, which was seeking to create contacts with Ukrainian nationalists.

Remaining under suspicion for his political activities, in 1937 he was forced by Polish authorities to relocate from the border region to central Poland.

After the 1939 invasion of Poland, he reached the German-occupied General Government and re-established contact with the UNR leadership in Warsaw. They instructed him to return to the Sarny area to organize a military force, which he did in August 1940. Following the Soviet annexation of Western Ukraine, Borovets organized an underground anti-Soviet resistance in Volhynia that became the partisan group known as the Polissian Sich.

== Organization of the Polissian Sich ==
In early July 1941, following the start of Operation Barbarossa, the German military command for the rear area of Army Group South appointed Borovets chief of a Ukrainian militia in the Sarny district. On August 8, 1941, the command of the Wehrmacht's 213th Security Division authorized him to form the Polissian Sich with an initial strength of 1,000 men. The formation's relationship to the later, more widely known Ukrainian Insurgent Army (UPA) is a subject of historical debate, as Borovets renamed his group the UPA in late 1941, preceding the Organization of Ukrainian Nationalists' (OUN-B) adoption of the same name for its forces.

German military authorities praised the unit for its operations against retreating Red Army soldiers. The Polessian Sich was officially disbanded by German order on November 16, 1941, as part of a policy to bring nationalist militias under direct control. Although Borovets claimed to have rejected German demands for his troops to participate in the mass murder of Jews, the Sich was involved in pogroms against the Jewish population of Olevsk. Its members also participated in German-led massacres in the area, including the killing of 535 Jews from Olevsk in November 1941. Reflecting the unit's antisemitic ideology, its newspaper, Haidamaka, announced at the end of 1941 that "the parasitical Jewish nation has been destroyed." After the official demobilization, Borovets maintained a small cadre of his forces, which formed the basis of his subsequent anti-German partisan activities.

== First UPA ==
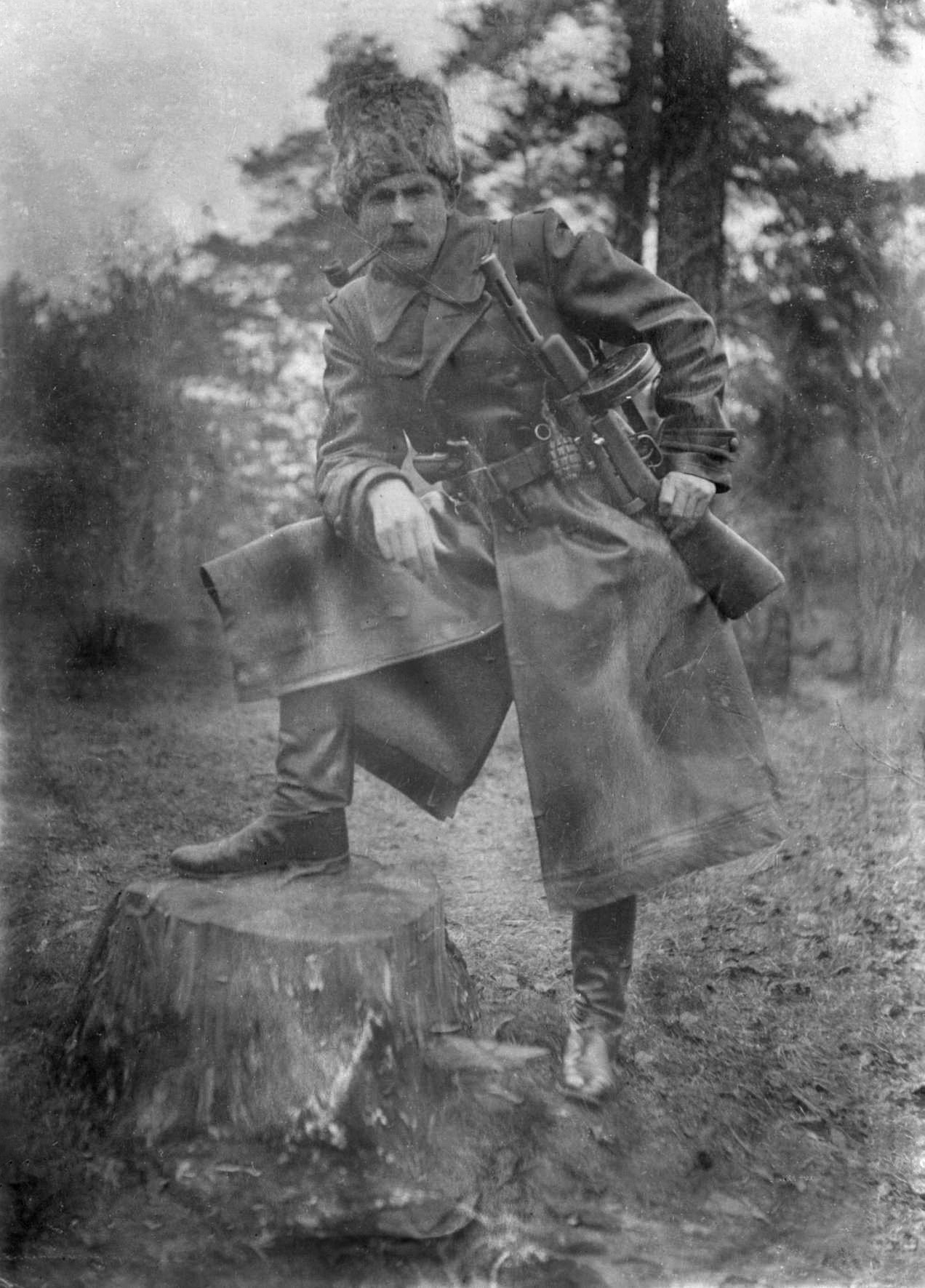
Taras Bulba-Borovets in 1942

Beginning in the spring of 1942, groups under Borovets' command began targeting German Gestapo detachments alongside their ongoing fight against Soviet partisans. In June 1942, Borovets wrote a letter to Reichskommissar Erich Koch accusing his administration of repressions against the Ukrainian population.

The Polisian Sich's most famous operation was a major sabotage action at Shepetivka on August 19, 1942. The operation targeted German military transport and was designed to be "silent," with the goal of disarming Wehrmacht troops rather than engaging them in lethal combat. During the raid, his partisans captured four trains and liberated two others carrying people for forced labor in Germany. Borovets himself later claimed in his memoirs that he "had spilled no German blood".

On September 15, 1942, "The law of a Ukrainian Partisan" was published, which first designated the partisan detachments under Borovets as the "Ukrainian Insurgent Army" (UPA). That same month, Borovets entered into negotiations with Soviet partisans under the command of Dmitry Medvedev. The two groups could not reach an agreement because Borovets refused to accept subservience to the Soviet command structure and feared German reprisals against Ukrainian civilians. Ideological differences also played a role, as Borovets was aligned with the government-in-exile of the Ukrainian National Republic. Nevertheless, a neutrality agreement was maintained between Borovets' detachments and the Soviet partisans until the spring of 1943.

Parallel to the negotiations with the Soviets, Borovets continued to seek an agreement with the Germans. On November 23, 1942, a meeting was held in Berezne with Obersturmbannführer Pütze, the chief of the security police and SD for the Volhynia-Podolia general district. Pütze stated that the negotiations were initiated because Borovets had never given an order "to shed German blood". He proposed that Borovets's forces be integrated into German-controlled Schutzmannschaften (auxiliary police) to fight Soviet partisans.

In subsequent written correspondence, Borovets formally rejected the offer. He made counter-proposals that included the release of all Ukrainian political prisoners and the recognition of a sovereign Ukrainian republic, but these demands were refused. In March 1943, Borovets developed a new plan for cooperation against Soviet forces. He proposed a partnership based on several principles: that German administration would change its occupation policies regarding Ukrainians; that the Germans would provide military equipment, and the Ukrainians would provide manpower; and that the cooperation would be formalized under the structure of an "independent Ukrainian partisan movement".

Borovets proposed raising a 40,000-strong partisan army under this arrangement, but the proposals were not acted upon by the Germans and remained only on paper.

== Ukrainian People's Revolutionary Army ==
On February 22, 1943, Borovets began negotiations with the leadership of the OUN-B to unite Ukrainian nationalist movements. The discussed proposal was for Borovets's Ukrainian Insurgent Army (UPA) to become the military organization of the unified forces, with OUN-B representatives joining the general staff. Borovets rejected the OUN-B's demand that he subordinate his forces to their command and objected to their totalitarian ideology. In May, the OUN-B terminated the negotiations and began applying the name "UPA" to its own armed detachments. As a result, on July 20, 1943, Borovets' UPA changed its name to the Ukrainian National Revolutionary Army (UNRA) to differentiate itself from the OUN-B's own army.

Borovets opposed the use of terror against national minorities, particularly the Poles. Despite his official position, some of his units were involved in anti-Polish actions. After Borovets refused to subordinate his movement to the OUN-B, his troops were attacked by OUN-B forces, with some destroyed and others incorporated into the OUN-B. His wife, Anna Opochens'ka, was presumably captured and killed by OUN-B members. Borovets and his remaining men were forced to withdraw into territory controlled by Soviet partisans to escape the OUN-B. In September, this group was defeated in the region, and he escaped. On October 5, 1943, Borovets ordered his remaining troops to disband and go underground. In November, he left his small group of remaining forces and went to Warsaw to seek negotiations with the Germans.

== End of World War II and emigration ==
In November 1943, during political negotiations with German officials in Warsaw, Borovets was arrested by the Gestapo and incarcerated in the Sachsenhausen concentration camp. In autumn 1944, as German authorities sought Ukrainian support during the war, Borovets was freed. He was made to change his nom de guerre to Kononenko and, under this name, led the formation of a Ukrainian special forces detachment of approximately 50 men within the structure of the Waffen-SS. The intended purpose for this detachment was for it to be dropped behind Red Army lines to conduct guerrilla warfare. These plans were not realized. Near the end of the war, some Ukrainian units collaborating with the Germans requested transfers away from the Eastern Front to surrender to Western Allied forces. Borovets' detachment surrendered to Allied forces on May 10, 1945, and its members were interned in Rimini, Italy.

Accounts of Borovets's location after the war differ. Some reports state he emigrated to Canada or the United States in 1948. However, according to internal Soviet secret service documents, he remained in West Germany for a period. These documents claim that he worked in an American intelligence school and traveled to the United States in 1953 to meet with CIA director Allen Dulles; this claim is not corroborated in other sources.

== Legacy ==
In 2014, the American historian Jared McBride criticized a plaque to Borovets in a Tablet article titled, "Ukrainian Holocaust Perpetrators Are Being Honored in Place of Their Victims".

== Sources ==
- Son of Polissia
- Army without country
- Taras Borovetz History of the UIA
- Taras Borovetz - Our opinion of Russia and General Vlasov
- Дзьобак, Володимир (1995). "Тарас Боровець і "Поліська Січ"". З архівів ВУЧК-ГПУ-НКВД-КГБ. 1/2(2/3). Archived from the original on March 11, 2012. LCC JN6635.A55 I679
- Дзьобак, Володимир (2002). Тарас Бульба-Боровець і його військові підрозділи в українському русі Опору (1941-1944 рр.). Киев: Інститут історії України. НАН України. ISBN 966-02-2192-4.
- Armstrong, John (January 1990). Ukrainian Nationalism (3rd ed.). Ukrainian Academic Press. ISBN 978-0-87287-755-9.
- Armstrong, John (1980). Ukrainian Nationalism (2nd ed.). Ukrainian Academic Press. ISBN 0-87287-193-2.
- Стельникович, Сергій (2007). Український національний рух опору Тараса Бульби-Боровця:історичний нарис. Житомир: Житомирська обласна друкарня.
- Ленартович (2011). Український національно-визвольний рух на Волині в роки Другої Світової війни. Волинський національный університет ім. Лесі Українки. ISBN 978-966-600-573-4.
