= Nortom =

Polish publishing house

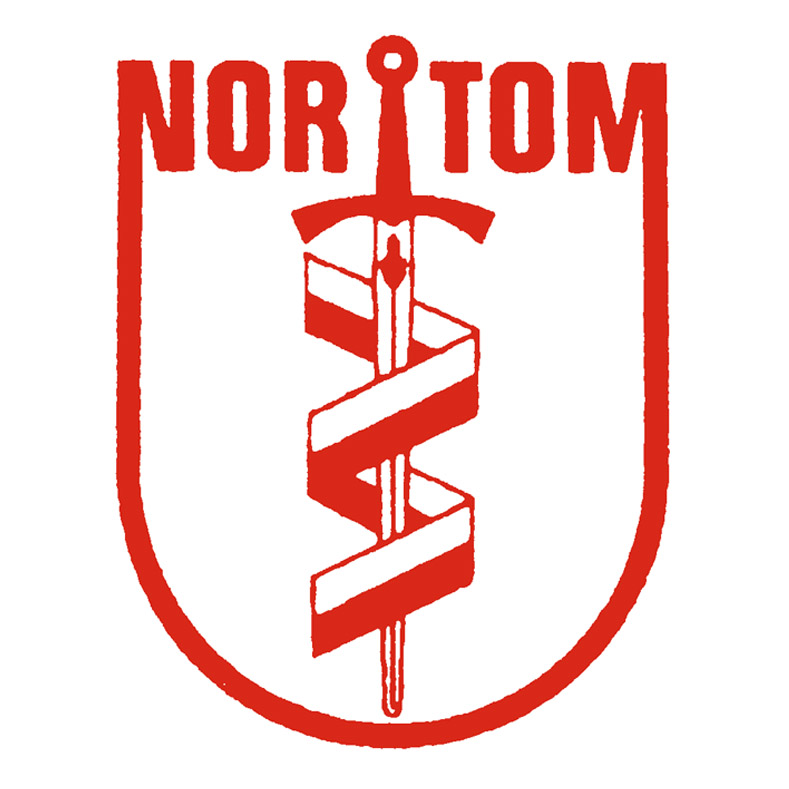

NORTOM is a Polish publishing house, founded in 1992 in Wrocław, specialising in books on Polish history with a focus on the Kresy region of the prewar Second Polish Republic, the Polish literature and political thought, including post-communist economic crises and nationalism. It also publishes religious books for children and youth. Nortom was founded by Norbert Tomczyk, re-elected in December 2000 as member of the Board of Control of the Polish Chamber of Book Publishers, a leader of the marginal National Party dissolved in 2001, whose ideology was based on that of the pre-war National Democratic movement, and which received 0.16% of the Polish vote in the presidential elections.

Authors featured by Nortom include Roman Dmowski (1864-1939) who was a chief architect of the reborn Polish state, politician, diplomat and statesman considered antisemitic; with a series on the return of Polish sovereignty; Jan Ludwik Popławski (1854-1908) the founder of The National-Democratic Party (1897); right-wing politician Janusz Dobrosz, member of the Polish Parliament; Dmowski's political ally Jędrzej Giertych, Polish war correspondent and Franco ally during the Spanish Civil War, expelled from the National Party because of his extremism and antisemitism; Zbigniew Żmigrodzki; Adam Doboszyński (1904-1949); Roman Rybarski (1887-1942), one of the best economists in prewar Poland, (another ally of Roman Dmowski); Czesław Czaplicki; Andrzej Sołdrowski, political prisoner under Stalinism; Lubomir Czupkiewicz; Piotr Kosobudzki; Maciej Giertych, a member of the European Parliament who created a scandal with his antisemitic writing; Stanisław Jastrzębski, veteran Polish underground fighter during World War II; controversial politologist Edward Prus; Stanisław Żurek; Norbert Tomczyk; Stanisław Sosenkiewicz; Henryk Komański; Szczepan Siekierka; Witalij Masłowśkyj; Aleksander Korman; Mieczysław Dobrzański; Feliks Koneczny, a Polish historian and social philosopher who claimed that Jews were conspiring to destroy Latin-Christian civilization and that Nazism was example of Jewish civilization type; Michał Poradowski; Stanisław Bełza; Izabella Wolikowska and others.

== Controversy ==
In 2000, Nortom was forced to withdraw its 12 controversial titles from the Frankfurt Book Fair by the Polish Ministry of Culture representative Andrzej Nowakowski overlooking the Polish exposition. Nortom was accused of selling anti-German, Anti-Ukrainian and antisemitic books, especially the following titles: Być czy nie być by Stanisław Bełza, Polska i Niemcy by Jędrzej Giertych and I tak nie przemogą. Antykościół, antypolonizm, masoneria by his son Maciej Giertych. As a result of the above request, the president of the Polish delegation Andrzej Chrzanowski from Polska Izba Książki decided to penalize Nortom by removing it from the 2000 book fair altogether.
