= Vysotsk, Rivne Oblast =

Vysotsk Висоцьк
- Village
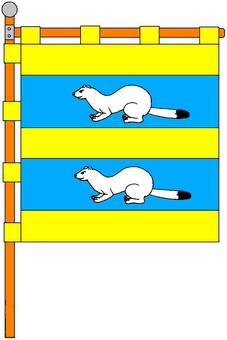
- Flag Coat of arms

- Location within Rivne Oblast Location within Ukraine
- Coordinates: 51°43′18″N 26°39′03″E
- Country: Ukraine
- Oblast: Rivne Oblast
- Raion: Sarny Raion
- Hromada: Vysotsk rural hromada
- Founded: 1005

Area
  - Total: 1.85 km^{2} (0.71 sq mi)
- Elevation: 142 m (466 ft)

Population (2021)
  - Total: 1,746
  - Density: 1,208.11/km^{2} (3,129.0/sq mi)
- Time zone: UTC+2 (EET)
  - Summer (DST): UTC+3 (EEST)
- Postal code (Index): 34111
- Area code: +380 3658

Vysotsk (Ukrainian: Висоцьк; Polish: Wysock) is a village in western Ukraine, in Sarny Raion of Rivne Oblast, but was formerly administered within Dubrovytsia Raion. As of the year 2001, the community had 2235 residents. The postal code is 34111, and the KOATUU code is 5621882001.

== Geography ==
The settlement is located on the Horyn river in the region of Western Polesia.

== History ==
During the Middle Ages Vysotsk belonged to the Principality of Turov-Pinsk.

During the liquidation of its ghetto on September 9, 1942, 1,600 to 1,800 Jews were killed in Vysotsk. The mass shooting was perpetrated by the Security Police of Pinsk. The Jews were in two graves about 2.5 kilometers outside of town. The Gendarmerie and local police forces from Stolin, Vysotsk and Davidgrodek participated in this Aktion.

During the Second World War Vysotsk was an area of fighting between the Ukrainian Insurgent Army, Germans and Soviet partisans. After the war it served as a district centre of Rivne Oblast.
