= Ryszard Torzecki =

Polish historian

Ryszard Torzecki (20 March 1925 in Łódź – 20 August 2003 in Konstancin) was a Polish historian, specializing in the Polish-Ukrainian relations. He graduated from the University of Łódź in 1949, majoring in economics, a field he would work in until 1970. He was a member of the Institute of History of the Polish Academy of Sciences and in the 1990s he served as one of the experts to the Polish parliament (Sejm) with regards to the Polish-Ukrainian relations. He was the author of over 100 scholarly works.
