= Edward Prus =

Edward Prus (born 1931 in Załoźce (now known as Zaliztsi) near Zboriv, (now in the Ternopil Oblast, Ukraine, died December 31, 2007) was a controversial Polish activist and political scientist with fields of interest in history of Poland (particularly the Second World War events in the Kresy region and contemporary Polish-Ukrainian relations) and politology. He was a professor at several minor Polish higher education institutions.

== Biography ==
During World War II, Edward Prus was a member of the Polish resistance, primarily involved in fighting the Ukrainian Insurgent Army. Later, he joined the destruction battalion (auxiliary formations of NKVD)

After the war he received a doctorate from the University of Warsaw. He would become a political activist, supporting the Polish communist government, and would hold professorship at several minor Polish higher education institutions. During the 1980s, he was an activist of the Patriotic Association Grunwald (Zjednoczenie Patriotyczne Grunwald).

After the fall of communism in Poland Prus became associated with Radio Maryja nationalist Catholic faction, and similar organizations and media. Prus was also known for his anti-EU positions and he worked as an adviser of the movement Nie dla Unii Europejskiej (No to the European Union) in Kraków. He was equally opposed Poland's accession to NATO. He has been also known for his strong criticism of Ukrainians, particularly in the view of the 20th century Polish-Ukrainian relations.

== Works ==
Prus's works have been criticised for significant bias. Many of Prus' publications have been printed in Wrocław by the controversial Nortom publishing house. Nortom is listed by the Roth Institute in Tel Aviv among the four Polish publishers known for their "antisemitic, Holocaust distorting or Holocaust denying books." Prus's works have been classified as nonscientific.

== Books ==
- Pannacjonalizm. Polityczna działalność emigracyjna byłych kolaboracjonistów z Europy wschodniej i południowo-wschodniej, Śląski Instytut Naukowy, Katowice 1976.
- Z dziejów współpracy nacjonalistów ukraińskich z Niemcami w okresie II wojny światowej i okupacji, Katowice 1985, Wyd. Akademia Ekonomiczna;
- Herosi spod znaku tryzuba: Konowalec - Bandera - Szuchewycz, Warszawa 1985, wyd. Instytut Wydawniczy Związków Zawodowych, ISBN 83-202-0369-4
- Władyka świetojurski, Warszawa 1985, Wyd. Instytut Wydawniczy Związków Zawodowych, ISBN 83-202-0302-3
- Atamania UPA: tragedia kresów, Warszawa 1988 Wyd. Instytut Wydawniczy Związków Zawodowych, ISBN 83-202-0631-6
- UPA - armia powstańcza czy kurenie rizunów ? Wrocław 1994, wyd.: "Nortom", ISBN 83-85829-31-8
- Holocaust po banderowsku. Czy Żydzi byli w UPA, wyd. I Wrocław 1995 ISBN 83-85829-45-8, Wyd. II rozszerzone: Nortom, Wrocław 2001, ISBN 83-85829-18-0
- Taras Czuprynka. Hetman UPA i wielki inkwizytor OUN, Nortom, Wrocław 1998, ISBN 83-85829-02-4
- Patriarcha galicyjski. Rzecz o arcybiskupie Andrzeju Szeptyckim metropolicie grekokatolickim, Nortom, Wrocław 1999
- Rycerze żelaznej ostrogi: oddziały wojskowe ukraińskich nacjonalistów w okresie II wojny światowej Wrocław 2000 ISBN 83-86882-98-0, wyd. Atla2
- SS-Galizien. Patrioci czy zbrodniarze?, Nortom, Wrocław 2001, ISBN 83-85829-68-7
- Legenda Kresów .Szare Szeregi w walce z UPA, Nortom, Wrocław 2003, ISBN 83-85829-44-X
- Stepan Bandera 1900-1959. Symbol zbrodni i okrucieństwa, Nortom, Wrocław 2004, ISBN 83-85829-89-X
- Operacja "Wisła", Nortom, Wrocław 2006, ISBN 978-83-89684-41-7
- Banderomachia - łże-rząd Stećki na tle rzeczywistości, Nortom, Wrocław 2007, ISBN 978-83-89684-09-7
- Szatańskie igrzysko: historia Organizacji Ukraińskich Nacjonalistów (OUN), Nortom, Wrocław 2009 ISBN 978-83-89684-29-5
