= Władysław Siemaszko =

Polish lawyer and author (1919–2025)

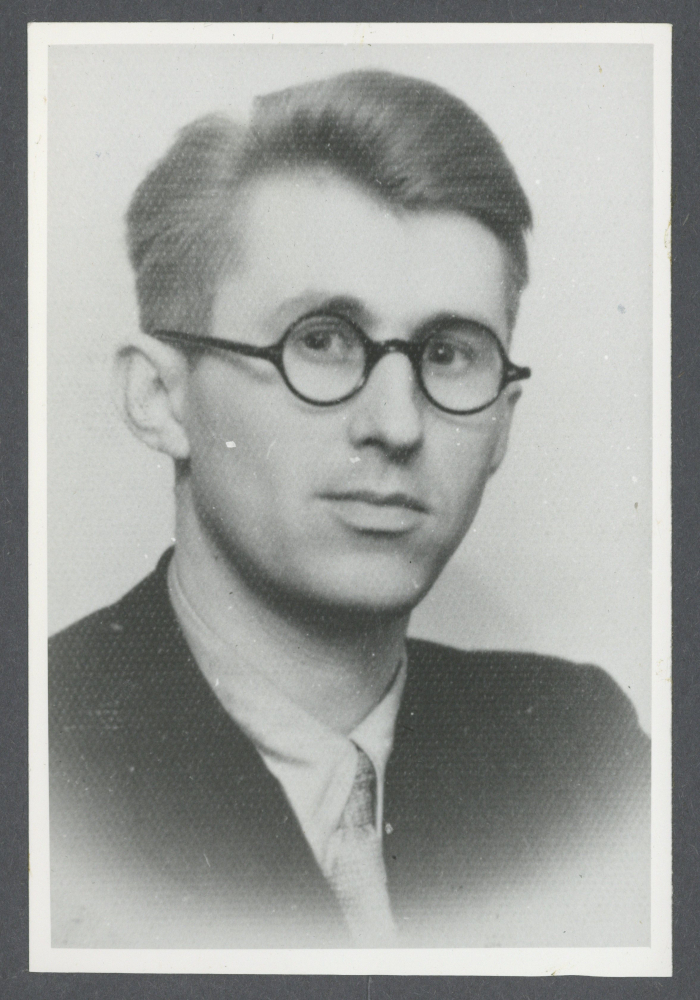
- Siemaszko in the 1930s
- Born: 8 June 1919 Curitiba, Paraná, Brazil
- Died: 11 December 2025 (aged 106)
- Occupation: Lawyer
- Children: Ewa Siemaszko

Władysław Siemaszko (8 June 1919 – 11 December 2025) was a Polish publicist and lawyer, a member of the Polish resistance Armia Krajowa (AK), and author of numerous publications focusing on the massacres of Poles in Volhynia. He was the father of writer Ewa Siemaszko, co-author of Ludobójstwo dokonane przez nacjonalistów ukraińskich na ludności polskiej Wołynia 1939–45 (The Genocide Committed by the Ukrainian Nationalists on Polish Citizens of Volhynia in 1939–45) consisting of two volumes of 1,500 pages of research.

== Background ==
Siemaszko was born in Curitiba, Paraná, Brazil, on 8 June 1919, to a Polish diplomat who was sent there by the Second Polish Republic to a diplomatic post. Władysław moved with his family back to Poland in 1924, and settled in Wołyń Voivodeship. The Siemaszko family had lived in Volhynia since January Uprising of 1863, after which Wladyslaw's grandfather bought some land from the Ukrainians in the area of Volodymyr-Volynskyi.

He joined the 27th Volhynian Division of the Home Army (AK) during World War II and remained in Volhynia until 1944. In 1940, the Soviet authorities captured and sentenced him to death, but reduced the sentence to 10–year imprisonment. Initially Siemaszko was imprisoned by NKVD in Lutsk, until the Nazi German attack on the Soviet Union in June 1941. Siemaszko managed to survive the massacres of Polish political prisoners carried out by the retreating Soviet military units and the NKVD. In 1945, Siemaszko was arrested again by the Soviets and transferred over to Polish communist authorities. He was imprisoned for two years in Poland until 1947 and released in 1949. Siemaszko graduated from the Faculty of Law of the Jagiellonian University of Kraków and became a legal advisor and defence lawyer.

Siemaszko died on 11 December 2025, at the age of 106.

== Work ==
Siemiaszko's first research project based on witness accounts related to the Volhynian massacres of Poles began in mid 80s. It was inspired by the initiatives of the surviving community of combatants of the 27th Volhynian Division of AK, and the apparent lack of historical documentation resulting in numerous misconceptions. Initially, Władysław Siemiaszko was asked to assist military historian Józef Turowski of the Polish Society of War Veterans, gathering materials for a memorial project. Turowski died on 24 July 1989, before their collaborative work, kept unpublished for four years by the authorities, became first available in Poland in 1990 as limited edition print.

Subsequently, Władysław with his daughter Ewa Siemaszko, in their own ten-year-long research project went on to document murders committed on Polish citizens by Ukrainian Insurgents in some 1,865 villages and towns of Volhynia during the Nazi and Soviet occupations. Their books were based on witness accounts, court documents including transcripts from trials of Ukrainian war criminals, as well as the Polish national archives and statistical censuses. They were published and distributed by a Polish non-governmental organization KARTA Center. The Siemiaszkos' collaborative work continued. In 2010 the Institute of National Remembrance (Bulletin No. 7–8, 116–117) published an overview of their joint research with the following up-to-date table of collected data.

Massacres of Poles in Volhynia and Eastern Galicia: documented numbers and approximations
Voivodeships	Recorded number of settlements where the murders took place	Documented number of Poles massacred (round number)	Number of Polish victims known by their names	Estimated victims above numbers already established	Approximated number of murdered Poles (round number)^{+}
Wołyń	1,865	~ 38,600	22,113	21,400	~ 60,000
Lwów	1,007	~ 15,400	6,397	9,395	~ 24,800
Stanisławów	422	~ 11,700	3,843	6,700	~ 18,400
Tarnopol	850	~ 23,000	10,143	4,585	~ 27,600
Total	4,144	~ 88,700	42,496	42,080	~ 130,800

== Discourse ==
According to the Ukrainian historian, Yaroslav Tsaruk, who studied the materials collected by the Siemaszkos, the number of ethnic Poles given by them, in some of the villages he is familiar with, does not correspond with the Ukrainian statistical data. According to Tsaruk, the Siemaszkos included in the number of Polish casualties those who emigrated before the commencement of hostilities, and included population points which were never separate administrative units, thus enlarging the number of Polish inhabitants while minimizing the Ukrainian casualties. Tsaruk claims that in the Volodymyr region initially there were attacks on Ukrainian villages by Polish-German police which were retaliated in self-defence. He writes that according to the Siemaszkos 1,915 Poles died in the hands of Ukrainian Nationalists in that area, but according to him – only 430. The Siemaszkos replied in their monograph by saying, that this type of criticism is based on statements made by Ukrainian villagers today, decades after the war ended. Therefore, the discrepancies in what has been said by the locals can be "explained by psychological defense mechanisms".

Another Ukrainian historian, Ihor Ilyushin, echoed Tsaruk's observations and questioned whether the Siemaszkos' approach, based on testimony from one side, can be truly objective – wrote Canadian historian David R. Marples (Heroes and villains). Marples quoted Ilyushin who said that because Władysław Siemaszko was a participant in the conflict he is not a credible witness. However, Marples also noted, that Ilyushin failed to reach a reasonable conclusion in his article and made no distinction between Ukrainian atrocities committed against officials and innocent civilians.

== Awards ==
- Władysław and Ewa Siemaszko were the 2002 recipients of the Józef Mackiewicz Award.

== See also ==
- Historiography of the Volyn tragedy
