= Ewa Siemaszko =

Polish engineer

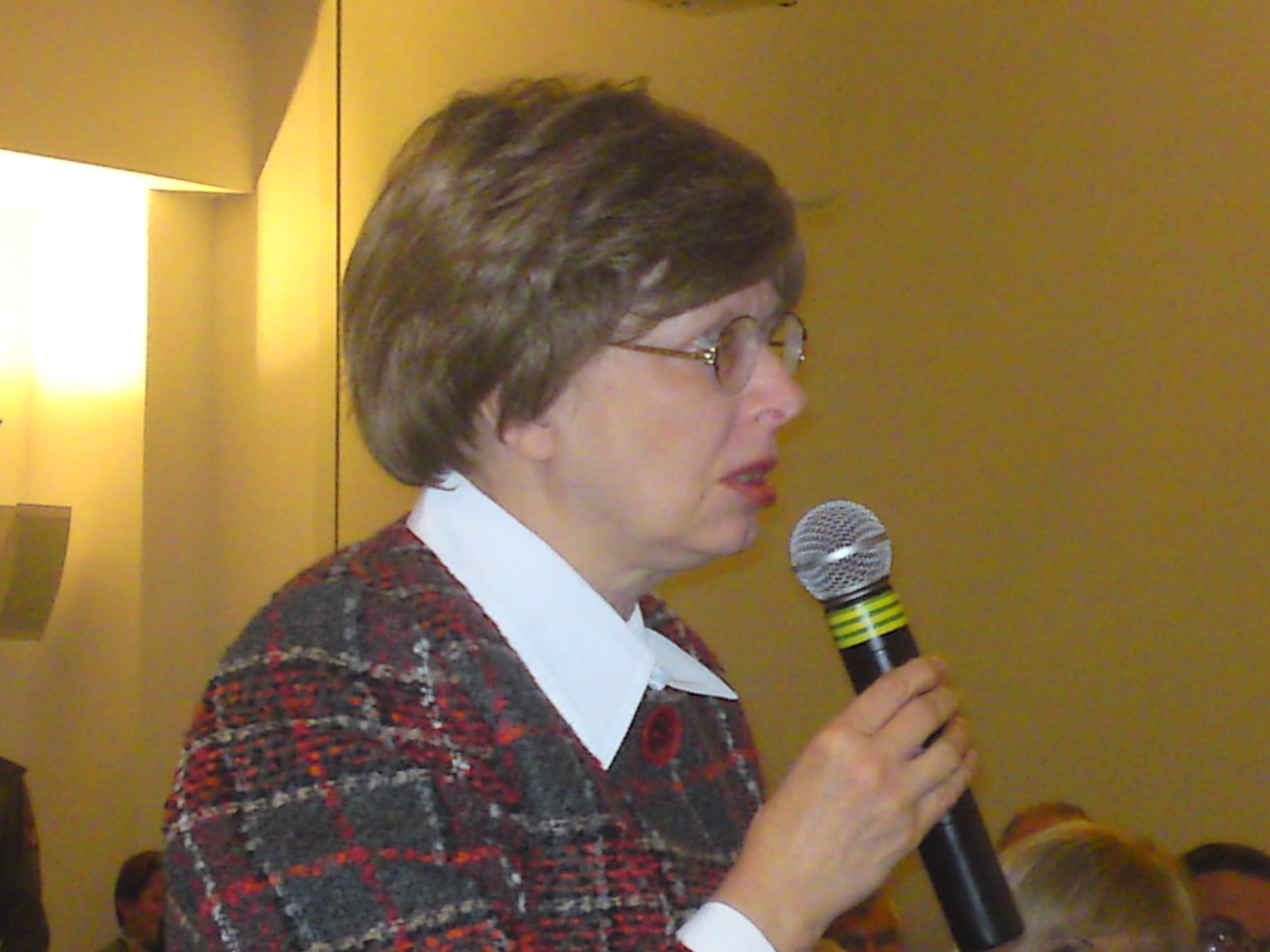
- Public lecture, 26 October 2010
- Born: 27 October 1947 (age 78)
- Education: Master's degree
- Alma mater: Warsaw University of Life Sciences
- Writing career
- Genre: Historiography
- Subject: World War II
- Notable work: Ludobójstwo dokonane przez nacjonalistów ukraińskich na ludności polskiej Wołynia 1939-1945 (Genocide committed by Ukrainian Nationalists in Volhynia 1939-1945)
- Notable awards: The 2002 Józef Mackiewicz Literary Prize and medal

Ewa Siemaszko (born 27 October 1947) is a Polish writer, publicist and lecturer; collector of oral accounts and historical data regarding the Massacres of Poles in Volhynia. An engineer by profession with Master's in technological studies from the Warsaw University of Life Sciences, Siemaszko worked in public health education and also as a school teacher following graduation. She is a daughter of writer Władysław Siemaszko with whom she collaborated and shared strong interest in Polish World War II history.

From 1990 Ewa Siemaszko collected and prepared documents regarding the ethnic cleansing that took place in Volhynia during the Second World War. She is the co-author of a 1992 exhibition at the Warsaw Museum of Independence regarding the atrocities committed by the NKVD in and around the Polish Kresy region in 1941; and, an exhibit "Wolyn or our ancestors" organised in 2002 at the Dom Polonii in Warsaw. She also collaborates with the Society of Volyn and Polissia at the Polish Institute of National Remembrance.

For her contribution to the monograph Ludobójstwo dokonane przez nacjonalistów ukraińskich na ludności polskiej Wołynia 1939-1945 (Genocide committed by Ukrainian Nationalists in Volhynia 1939–1945) written together with her father Władysław, she received the Józef Mackiewicz Literary Prize and medal in 2002.

== Selected publications ==
- Ewa Siemaszko with Władysław Siemaszko, Ludobójstwo dokonane przez nacjonalistów ukraińskich na ludności polskiej Wołynia 1939-1945, (Genocide committed by the Ukrainian Nationalists against the Polish inhabitants of Volyn) Warsaw, 2000, length: 1433 pages, illustrated, ISBN 83-87689-34-3. Preface by Prof. dr Ryszard Szawłowski.
- Ewa Siemaszko, Wołyń naszych przodków Śladami życia - czas zagłady, 2008 (in Polish)
- Ewa Siemaszko, The July 1943 genocidal operations of the OUN-UPA in Volhynia

== Ukrainian responses ==
According to Ukrainian historian Yaroslav Tsaruk (Ярослав Царук), who commented on data collected by Siemaszkos, the number of ethnic Poles given by them, in some of the villages he is familiar with, does not correspond with his Ukrainian research. According to Tsaruk, Siemaszkos included in the number of Polish citizens also those who emigrated before the commencement of hostilities according to him, and included population points which were not administrative units, thus enlarging the number of Polish victims of ethnic cleansing while minimizing the Ukrainian casualties. Tsaruk claims that although according to Siemaszkos 1,915 Poles died in the hands of Ukrainian Nationalists in the area of Volodymyr, according to him – only 430. Siemaszkos in their own monograph replied to this kind of criticism by stating that claims made by Tsaruk are based on statements made by Ukrainian villagers half a century after the war ended, therefore the discrepancies in what is being said by the locals can be "explained by psychological defense mechanisms".

Another Ukrainian historian, Ihor Ilyushin, echoed Tsaruk's observations and questioned whether Siemaszkos' approach, based on testimony from one side, can be truly objective – wrote Canadian historian David R. Marples in Heroes and villains. Marples quoted Ilyushin as saying that because Władysław Siemaszko was a participant in the conflict he is not a credible witness. However, Marples also noted that Ilyushin failed to reach a reasonable conclusion in his article and made no distinction between Ukrainian atrocities committed against officials and innocent civilians; men, women and children.
