= Defense of Huta Stepańska and Wyrka =

Part of World War II

- Part of the Massacres of the Poles in the Volhynia and Galicia during the Polish–Ukrainian ethnic conflict in the World War II
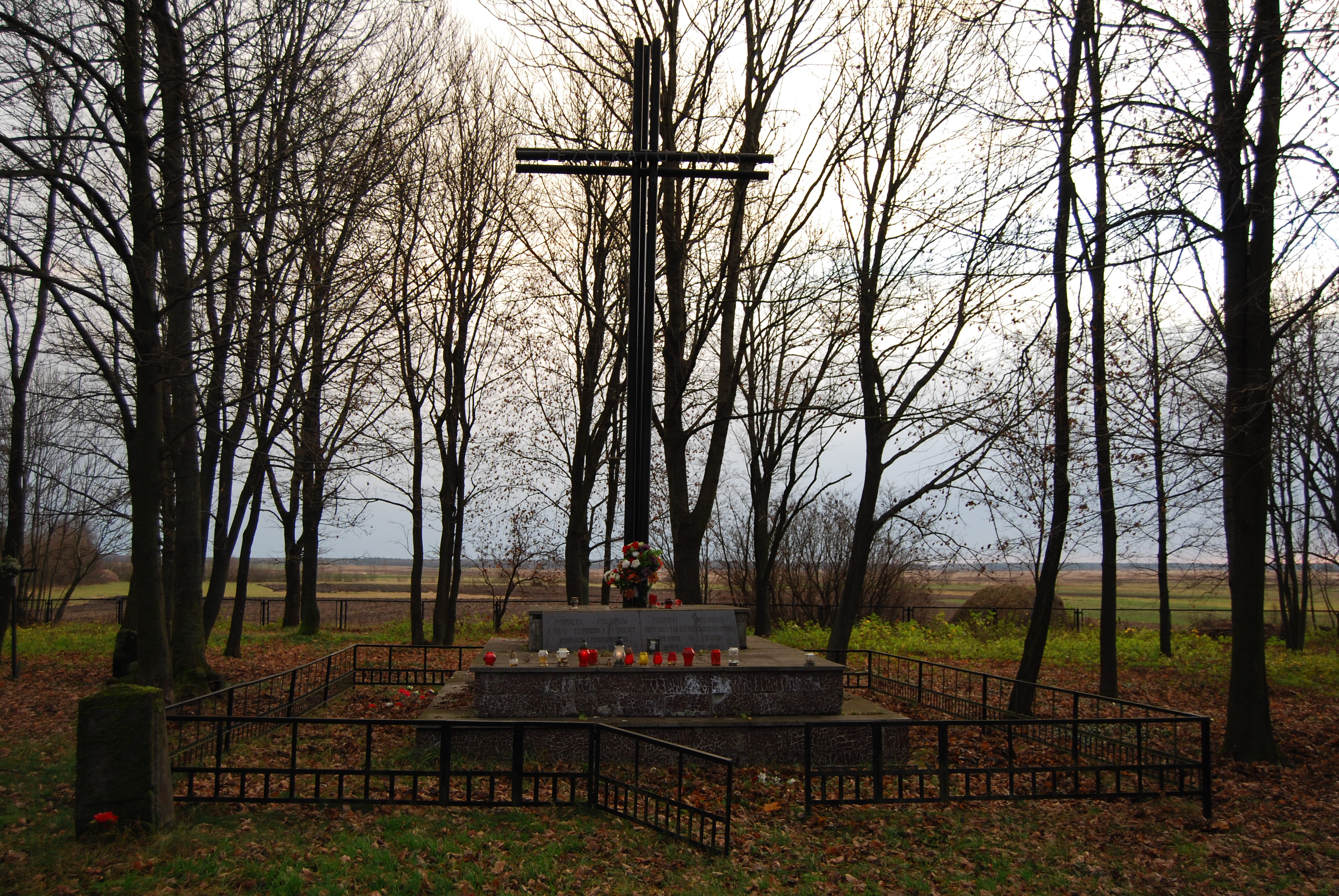
- Memorial to the murdered Poles in Huta Stepańska
Date	16–19 July 1943
Location	Huta Stepańska and Wyrka, Kostopol County, Wołyń Voivodeship
Result	Ukrainian victory

Belligerents
Ukrainian Insurgent Army (Ukraine) Kusch Units of the Ukrainian Self–Defense	Polish Self–Defense; Home Army; Soviet partisans Germany

Commanders and leaders
Ivan Lytvynchuk; Dmytro Voytseshko; Vasyl Pavlonyuk; Dmytro Korinets; Dmytro Kalynyuk; Makar Melnyk	Jan Szabelski; Władysław Kochański (WIA); Józef Sobiesiak

Units involved
Northern Operational Group: 1st Operational Group “Zahrava”; Western Operational Group: 6th Operational Group “Syan”	Armed Unit of the Polish Self–Defense; Fourth Platoons of the Home Army; Armed Detachment of the Soviet partisans

Strength
1,000 men	Huta Stepańska: 500 men (of which only 80 with firearms); Wyrka: Unknown

Casualties and losses
18–30 killed 17 wounded	40 killed 10 killed
- 500 Poles murdered

The Defense of Huta Stepańska and Wyrka (Polish: Obrona Huty Stepańskiej i Wyrki, Ukrainian: Оборона Гути Степанської і Вирки; 16–19 July 1943) was fought between the 1st Operational Group “Zahrava” in the Northern Operational Group and 6th Operational Group “Syan” in the Western Operational Group of the Ukrainian Insurgent Army and Kusch Units of the Ukrainian Self–Defense under the command of Ivan Lytvynchuk, Dmytro Voytseshko, Vasyl Pavlonyuk, Dmytro Korinets, Dmytro Kalynyuk, and Makar Melnyk against the Polish Self–Defense, Home Army and Soviet partisans under the command of Jan Szabelski, Władysław Kochański and Józef Sobiesiak in the outskirts of the villages of Huta Stepańska and Wyrka in the Kostopol County of the Wołyń Voivodeship. The tasks of the Northern Operational Group and Western Operational Group were eliminating and destroying the strongholds of the armed formations of the Polish Self–Defense in the villages of Huta Stepańska, Wyrka, Borek, Lady, Omelianki, Romaszkowe, Ciemne, Łomy, Mielniki, Huta Mydzka, Podselecze, Poliali, Hołyń, Kamenianka, Mielnicy, Hały, Wyróbki, Ostrówki, Osówicze, Szymonisko, Tur, Użane, Iwancze, Perespa, Berezówka, Kamenia, Siedliska and Żywka, from which Polish punitive attacks on the Ukrainian civilian population were carried out.

== Before the battle ==
In 1942 and early 1943, the Polish inhabitants of Huta Stepańska and Wyrka were terrorized by Ukrainian nationalists. The Ukrainian auxiliary police carried out searches in search of Jews, and property was also requisitioned. February 9, 1943 After the crime in Buteyki, a meeting was held in Huta Stepańska, during which the village self-defense was established. Sentinels armed with pikes were to guard the roads leading to the village. The next night, a group of Ukrainians broke into Huta and kidnapped and murdered four men, including two guards. one of the dead guards before death managed to kill one of the attackers and severely wound the other in self-defense.

After this incident, the self-defense was strengthened. Władysław Kurkowski "Duch" became the chairman of the Self-Defense Committee. The defenders were divided into teams and platoons. The construction of defensive fortifications and shooting positions began around the village. The enemy's movements were observed from the church tower. At the same time, a similar self-defense organization was established in Wyrka, 6 km away. Its commander was 2nd Lieutenant. Jan Skiba. Both self-defense forces cooperated with each other, covering, in addition to Huta Stepańska and Wyrka, the following towns: Borek, Mielnica, Temne, Kamionka, Lady, Omelanka, Romaszkowo, Siedlisko, Ostrówek, Perespa, Ziwka, Hały, Szymonisko, Brzezina, Użanie, Soszniki, Tur and Wyrobki .

From April 13, 1943, the commander of the self-defense of Huta Stepańska was Sergeant Jan Szabelski. In May 1943, Lieutenant came to Wyrka. Władysław Kochański "Bomba", silent and dark, with the task of rebuilding the underground network of the Home Army in the Kostopol district, destroyed as a result of German arrests. "Bomba" joined the construction of self-defense and became its leader.

As the extermination of Poles intensified during the Volhynian genocide the number of refugees gathered in the self-defense center increased. At the beginning of July 1943, in Huta Stepańska, there were approximately 3 thousand people, and in Wyrka approximately 2 thousand. Ukrainian nationalists tried to identify self-defense forces, using village head Jakub Kryczylski as their agent and organizing mill expeditions and patrols. This was prevented by changing the village headman to a Pole, Stanisław Drozdowski, and banning Ukrainians from entering the village.

=== Collaboration with communist partisans and offensive actions ===
The Huta Stepańska-Wyrka self-defense center provided assistance to Soviet and Polish communist partisans, as well as the unit named after Tadeusz Kościuszko or the unit of Józef Sobiesiak "Maks". After some time, the belief began to grow among the defenders of the village that the communist partisans treated cooperation with self-defense as an opportunity to recruit volunteers.

At the end of March 1943, a self-defense group from Huta Stepańska together with several Soviet partisans attacked Mielnica Mała, where they defeated the UPA militia, killing a dozen or so Ukrainians. A similar action took place on April 7, 1943, upon learning of the gathering of UPA forces in Buteyki. The self-defense group together with Soviet partisans dispersed the UPA members, but suffered significant losses of 18 killed.

At the beginning of May 1943, the self-defense group provided assistance to the Wilcze colony in Łuck County defending itself against the UPA. After the UPA attack was repelled, the besieged were evacuated to Huta Stepańska and Wyrka. Similar aid was provided in June to the attacked Polish villages of Ziwka Stara, Brzezina, and Soszniki in Sarny County.

== Battle ==
The forces of the Ukrainian Insurgent Army (UPA), supported by Ukrainian peasants from the SKV (Self-Defense Kushch Units), launched a massive attack on the self-defense center on the evening of July 16, 1943. Smaller self-defense points could not withstand the assault and retreated to Huta Stepańska. Civilians from nearby Polish settlements such as Perespa, Soshnyky, Uzhany, Haly, and Tur also fled. At the same time, the first UPA group captured and burned Polish settlements Borek and Lyady. They also took control of a stronghold near the therapeutic mud resort "Salty Swamp."

At night, UPA emissaries arrived in Huta Stepańska from the direction of Buteyky, demanding the surrender of the settlement under the threat of its complete destruction. There was no time to respond as the emissaries departed (according to other sources, the self-defense forces killed the envoys). During the night of July 16–17, the self-defense forces of Vyrka and Sedlyshche, along with peaceful civilians, retreated to Huta Stepańska. However, the partisan group "Max" left the village, taking with them 17 armed defenders of Huta, significantly weakening its defensive capability.

Huta Stepańska remained the only settlement in Polish hands, surrounded by burning Polish villages.

On the morning of July 17, 1943, the Ukrainian Insurgent Army (UPA) launched a major assault on Huta Stepańska. Massive waves of attacks by UPA fighters and armed peasants were repelled with great difficulty. Hand-to-hand combat broke out repeatedly, and the attackers were driven out of the village center three times. Civilians, threatened with death, sought refuge near the church, school, and post office.

The defense was effectively and devotedly commanded by Lieutenant Kochanski ("Bomba"), who was wounded in his left arm. It is estimated that approximately 50–100 defenders and civilians were killed during the July 17 attack. According to Józef Turowski, Ukrainian losses were even higher. Following this, UPA attacks ceased, but the final assault on the village occurred at 7 a.m.

=== Evacuation ===
When, due to lack of ammunition, the decision was made to leave Huta Stepańska on July 18, 1943, several hundred carts filled with people were standing in front of the church and a column was being formed to march. The earlier morning, arbitrary and panic escape of about 1,000 people towards Rafałówka ended tragically on the bridge beyond Wyrka. The command took decisive measures to successfully remove the population. Several wagons were placed next to each other and armed defense was set up, ready to repel a possible attack. They were waiting for the marching order. At 1 p.m., the noise stopped, the gathered people began to kneel like a wave, and the frightened people turned to the church. The priest entered the cart. Bronisław Drzepecki, gave general absolution (in articulo mortis) to everyone, ending with the words: "May Almighty God the Father, the Son of God and the Holy Spirit bless you." The gathered people believed in a lucky rescue, and the unfurled and raised holy banners showed the way.

At this time, another attack occurred from the direction of Slony Blota, the self-defence supported by about 500 Kosminers repulsed the assault. The Banderites and peasants threw themselves into retreat, and the defenders joined the outgoing column. At the same time, a thunderstorm broke loose and progressed behind those leaving Huta, as if protecting their rear.

The next day after Huta Stepańska was captured, the UPA burned the church.

=== The Fate of the Poles after the evacuation ===
Part of the population was loaded onto railway wagons by the Germans after travelling about 20 km and reaching the railway stations on the Kowel-Sarny line, and taken to work in the Reich. The rest reached Wydymer near Włodzimierz, from where they were dispersed to Antonówka, Kowel, Sarny and Przebraże. The armed defenders of Huta Stepańska, consisting of sworn Home Army soldiers, found shelter in Perespa near Antonovka, and then in Karachun. At the beginning of August 1943, as a partisan unit of the Home Army under the command of "Bomba", in company strength they joined the self-defense in Huta Stara. After the UPA attack on April 13/14, 1943, she was saved, among others. the family of the local teacher Czesław Gawęda. A descendant of one of the saved families is Janusz Horoszkiewicz, guardian of Polish memorial sites in Volhynia, investigator of the OUN - UPA crimes, winner of the Custodian of National Remembrance award.

=== Battle against Germans ===
A detachment under the command of F. Kononovych ("Tsyhan") engaged in battle with German forces in the Yapolot ravine. The fight lasted 45 minutes. The defeated Germans left behind 10 dead. The insurgents captured 2 heavy machine guns, 1 light machine gun, three motorcycles, three pistols, seven rifles, 15 grenades, over 2,000 rounds of ammunition, and burned two vehicles. The insurgents sustained only a few light injuries.

== Aftermath ==
The liquidation of the Huta Stepańska-Wyrka self-defense center was led by Ivan Litvinchuk "Dubovyj". He gave him the task of destroying Huta "Korban" and "Borysten" of Wyrki. The action was insured by the "Czyhana" unit and part of the "Jarema" unit. According to Polish estimates, as a result of UPA attacks on towns located in the Huta Stepańska-Wyrka self-defense center on July 16–18, 1943. approximately 600 Poles died. UPA report of July 27, 1943 he spoke of over 500 Poles killed and an unspecified number of wounded. He estimated his own losses at 18 killed and 17 wounded. The Poles rate the UPA losses as unknown. Though the self-defense base was liquidated, they quickly joined with other self-defense units, including the Huta Stara self-defense, which would go on and stage a victorious defenses from August 1943 to January 1944.

=== Commemoration ===
In today's Huta Stepańska there exists several monuments commemorating the dead Poles. Like a cross of the then Catholic church with the inscription "Jezu Ratuj Nas" and a description in both Polish and Ukrainian. In 2017, Huta Stepańska was added to the Tomb of the Unknown Soldier in Warsaw.
