= Kazimierz Iranek-Osmecki =

Polish infantry colonel

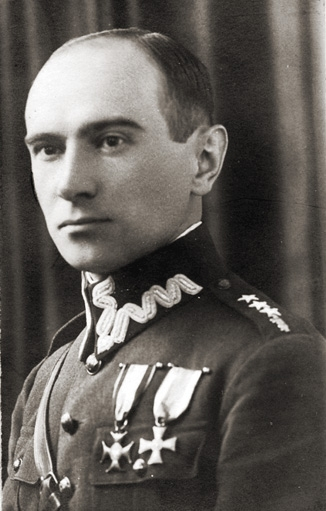
- Born: September 5, 1897; Pstrągowa, Galicia, Austria-Hungary (modern-day Poland)
- Died: May 22, 1984 (aged 86); London, United Kingdom
- Military career
- Allegiance: Second Polish Republic
- Branch: Polish Legions; Polish Land Forces
- Service years: 1916–1945
- Rank: Pułkownik
- Nicknames: Kazimierz Jarecki; Włodzimierz Ronczewski; Makary; Antoni Heller; Pstrąg
- Conflicts: World War I; Italian Front; Polish–Soviet War; World War II; Polish Defensive War; Warsaw Uprising (POW)
- Awards: Virtuti Militari

Kazimierz Wincenty Iranek-Osmecki (noms de guerre Kazimierz Jarecki, Włodzimierz Ronczewski, Makary, Antoni Heller, Pstrąg; 5 September 1897 – 22 May 1984, London) was an infantry colonel (pułkownik) in the Polish Army, and colonel in Poland's Home Army (AK). He fought in the 1944 Warsaw Uprising, and was responsible for negotiations between the Home Army and the German Wehrmacht.

Iranek-Osmecki commanded the Home Army General Staff's Section II (Intelligence and Counterintelligence), and was a Cichociemny. He discovered the German V-1 and V-2 testing facility at Peenemünde.

== Life ==
Born on September 5, 1897, in the village of Pstrągowa, Austrian Galicia, he attended the Second High School in Rzeszów, joining the Riflemen's Association in 1913. In December 1916, he became a soldier of the Second Battalion, 1st Infantry Regiment of the Polish Legions in World War I. After the Oath crisis of 1917, Iranek-Osmecki was drafted into the Austro-Hungarian Army, and sent to the Italian Front (World War I). He managed to escape and returned to Kraków. Sent by the Polish Military Organisation (POW) to Iłża (November 1917), he became a local commander of POW there.

In November 1918, Iranek-Osmecki entered the newly created Polish Army's 23rd Infantry Regiment. In January 1919, he was transferred to the Operational Group of Colonel Leopold Lis-Kula. In March 1919, he became chief of staff at 1st Legions Infantry Brigade, and in March 1920, he was sent to Infantry Department of the Ministry of Military Affairs. In December 1920, Iranek-Osmecki joined the headquarters of military police, and in May 1921, he was sent to the staff of the 19th Infantry Division (Poland). After completing a NCO course, he was named company commandant at the 77th Infantry Regiment.

On December 23, 1929, Iranek-Osmecki began a two-year course at Wyższa Szkoła Wojenna in Warsaw. On September 1, 1930, he was promoted to officer, and on May 1, 1933, he became a major. For most of the early 1930s, he lectured at the military college, returning to active service in 1937, when he was named battalion commandant of the 36th Infantry Regiment (Poland).

=== World War II ===
During the 1939 Invasion of Poland, Iranek-Osmecki was an officer at the Polish General Staff, serving under General Quartermaster, Colonel Jozef Wiatr. On September 17, 1939, he crossed the Polish-Romanian border.

In October 1939, Iranek-Osmecki was named deputy commandant of Bucharest officer of the Second Department of Polish General Staff. In December of that year, he joined the Union of Armed Struggle. In June 1940, after moving to France, he continued working at the Polish General Staff, responsible for communication with occupied Poland. On November 6, 1940, following the order of Commander in chief, General Władysław Sikorski, Iranek-Osmecki went to Poland, reaching Warsaw on December 18, 1940, and reporting immediately to General Stefan Grot-Rowecki. On January 21, 1941, Iranek-Osmecki headed back to London, reaching the British capital on April 15, 1941.

Back in London, Iranek-Osmecki once again worked for the General Staff. In the night of March 13/14 1943, he was parachuted over Poland on the personal request of General Rowecki. Between April 1943 – January 1944, he was a quartermaster of the Home Army, to be moved to intelligence and information department of the AK. In late July 1944, Iranek-Osmecki reported to his superiors about a German panzer counterattack in Praga. His report was sidelined, and the decision to begin the Warsaw Uprising was taken by the Home Army Leaders.

On October 1, 1944, Iranek-Osmecki was named the envoy of General Bor-Komorowski, and began negotiations with the Germans. On October 3, together with Colonel Zygmunt Dobrowolski, he signed the capitulation of Polish forces in Warsaw. Captured by the Germans, he was sent to Oflag IV-C.

After the war, Iranek-Osmecki settled in London (May 1945), never to return to Communist Poland. In December 1945, he joined the Society of Home Army Soldiers, and remained an active member of this organization. Also, he was a member of Temporary Council of National Unity and other Polish emigree organizations. In February 1965, he was promoted to General brygady, but did not accept this rank, claiming that the wartime promotion to Colonel was more important to him. In 1971, Iranek-Osmecki published a book thoroughly documenting the tragedy of Jews in Poland during World War II and the help given to the Jews by the Poles.

Kazimierz Wincenty Iranek-Osmecki died on May 22, 1984, in London.

== Promotions ==
- Major (Major) - 1 January 1933
- Podpułkownik (Lieutenant colonel) - 19 March 1939
- Pułkownik (Colonel) - 14 March 1943

== Awards ==
- Gold Cross of Virtuti Militari
- Silver Cross of Virtuti Militari
- Commander's Cross of the Order of Polonia Restituta
- Cross of Independence (9 November 1932)
- Cross of Valour (three times)
- Gold Cross of Merit with Swords
- Gold Cross of Merit (11 November 1937)
- Silver Cross of Merit with Swords
- Silver Cross of Meirt (10 November 1928)
- Cross of the Home Army
- Medal of the 10th Anniversary of the War of Independence (Latvija)

== See also ==
- List of Poles

== Sources ==
- Andrzej Krzysztof Kunert: Słownik biograficzny konspiracji warszawskiej 1939–1944. T. 2. Warszawa: Instytut Wydawniczy PAX, 1987
- Jerzy Majka, Grzegorz Ostasz: Pułkownik Kazimierz Iranek-Osmecki. Emisariusz, cichociemny, oficer Komendy głównej AK. Rzeszów: Wydawnictwo Libra, 2007 OCLC 177306761
