= Stefan Bałuk =

Polish general and photographer (1914–2014)

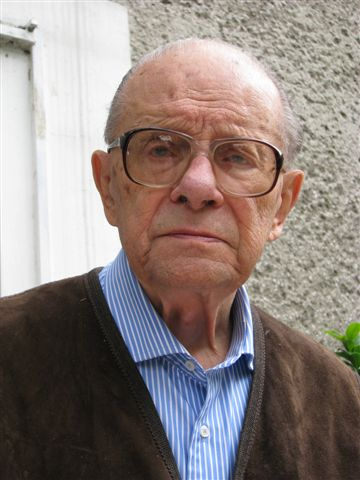
- Bałuk on 27 August 2008
- Born: 15 January 1914
- Died: 29 January 2014 (aged 100)
- Resting place: Powązki Military Cemetery
- Occupations: Soldier; taxicab driver
- Military career
- Allegiance: Polish Underground State
- Service: Home Army
- Rank: Brigadier general
- Units: 10th Cavalry Brigade; Silent Unseen
- Conflicts: World War II; Invasion of Poland; Warsaw Uprising
- Awards: Virtuti Militari; Cross of the Home Army; Order of Polonia Restituta

Stefan Bałuk (15 January 1914 – 29 January 2014) was a Polish general and photographer.

== World War II ==
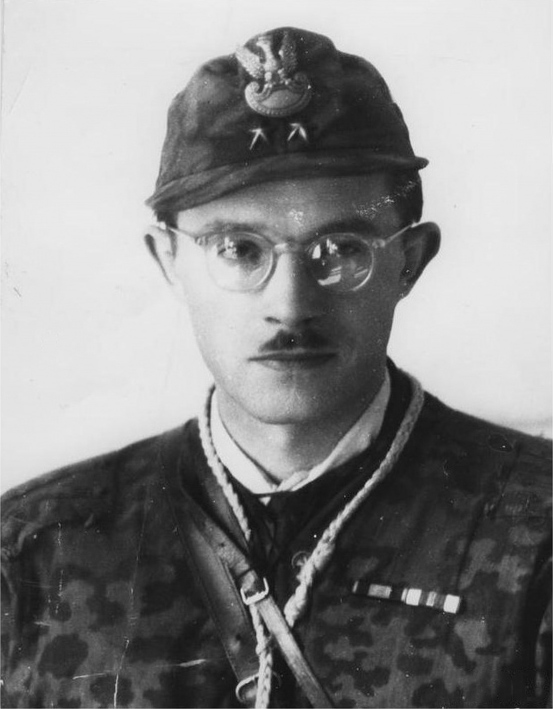
Bałuk in 1944

Born on 15 January 1914, Bałuk was a law student at the University of Warsaw at the onset of World War II. After joining the Home Army, Bałuk fought in the Invasion of Poland, and then transferred to the 10th Motorized Cavalry Brigade. Bałuk received parachute commando training in Glasgow before being dropped back into Poland in April 1944 as a Silent Unseen. Bałuk "engaged in the production of false documents for Polish intelligence officers, made photo documentation of German military installations in Warsaw and took part in the Warsaw Uprising." After his release from the Nazi prisoner-of-war camp, Oflag II-D, in Großborn, Bałuk traveled to his mother's and sister's home in Praga; he found their house destroyed, but with a note saying they had fled to safety.

During his World War II service, Bałuk was promoted to the (21st-century equivalent) rank of brigadier general and awarded both the Virtuti Militari and the Cross of the Home Army.

== Post-war ==
After the war, Bałuk was imprisoned by the Soviet Union from November 1945 to March 1947. He later worked as a taxicab driver and took up photography as a hobby—publishing several photo albums. In 2008, Bałuk published his memoir: Byłem Cichociemnym (released in English as Silent and Unseen: I Was a WWII Special Ops Commando). Bałuk died on 29 January 2014.

He was posthumously awarded the Grand Cross of the Order of Polonia Restituta by the president of Poland, Bronisław Komorowski, and later buried in Powązki Military Cemetery. In May 2023, Bałuk was one of 19 insurgents honored by Warsaw and the Warsaw Rising Museum with a tree planted in Insurgents Park in Wola.
