= Ivan Lytvynchuk =

Ukrainian military officer

- Іван Самійлович Литвинчук
- Born: 21 August 1920; Wołyń Voivodeship Second Polish Republic
- Died: 19 January 1951 (aged 30); Horokhiv Raion, Ukrainian SSR, Soviet Union
- Military career
- Allegiance: Ukrainian Insurgent Army
- Branch: Paramilitary
- Rank: Colonel
- Nickname: Dubovyi
- Conflicts: Eastern Front (World War II); Polish–Ukrainian conflict; Volhynian massacre; Janowa Dolina massacre; Defense of Huta Stepańska and Wyrka; Battle of Moczulanka; Anti-Soviet Resistance by the Ukrainian Insurgent Army †
- Awards: Cross of Combat Merit

Ivan Samiilovych Lytvynchuk (also known by his pseudonym Ivan Dubovyi; Ukrainian: Іван Самійлович Литвинчук; Polish: Iwan Łytwynczuk; 21 August 1920 – 19 January 1951) was a commander of the military district of the Ukrainian Insurgent Army (UPA), a member of the Organization of Ukrainian Nationalists (OUN), a war criminal, and a Major. He is believed to have been one of the organizers and initiators of the Volhynian massacre, recognized as a genocide. His units were among the first in Volhynia to begin the extermination of Poles.

== Biography ==
He was born in 1920 in Derman Druha, Volhynia, into a family of an Orthodox priest (according to other researchers, he was born in Biskupice Ruskie).

He studied at the Volhynian Orthodox Theological Academy in Kremenets. Between 1937 and 1939, he was imprisoned by Polish authorities for underground activities in the OUN.

In 1943, he organized UPA units in northeastern Volhynia and became the commander of the Military District (WO) UPA "Zahrawa".

Prosecutor Piotr Zając and historian Grzegorz Motyka suggest his possible involvement (together with Dmytro Klyachkivsky and Vasyl Ivakhiv) in the decision to carry out the Volhynian massacre. (Note: According to Ukrainian historians, there is no confirmation of this fact in OUN-UPA documents, to which Grzegorz Motyka responds by citing the analogous example of the lack of a written order from Stalin regarding the initiation of the Holodomor. See: Причини in Волинська трагедія: що сталося 70 років тому, і чого хоче польська сторона) Units under Lytvynchuk's command were among the first in Volhynia to begin the extermination of Poles. Lytvynchuk directly participated in the destruction of the Janowa Dolina settlement, where his units murdered approximately 600 Poles, Lytvynchuk was particularly zealous in carrying out the murders of Poles, which he often boasted about.

He died in 1952 by blowing himself up in a bunker attacked by the NKVD in Horokhiv Raion in Volyn Oblast.

== Commemoration ==
A Memorial Cross was erected at the site of Ivan Lytvynchuk's death, and a school in the village of Zolochiv, Lviv Oblast was named after him.

== Bibliography ==
- Motyka, Grzegorz (2006). Ukraińska partyzantka 1942-1960. Oficyna Wydawnicza RYTM. ISBN 83-7399-163-8.
- V. Zavedniuk, Lytvynchuk Ivan [В. Заведнюк, Литвинчук Іван [w] Тернопільський енциклопедичний словник. редкол.: Г. Яворський та ін.. T. 2: К—О. Тернопіль : Видавничо-поліграфічний комбінат «Збруч», 2005, s. 368. ISBN 966-528-199-2.] TWSE: 2
