= Józef Hartman =

Polish Army colonel and SOE training commander (1898–1979)

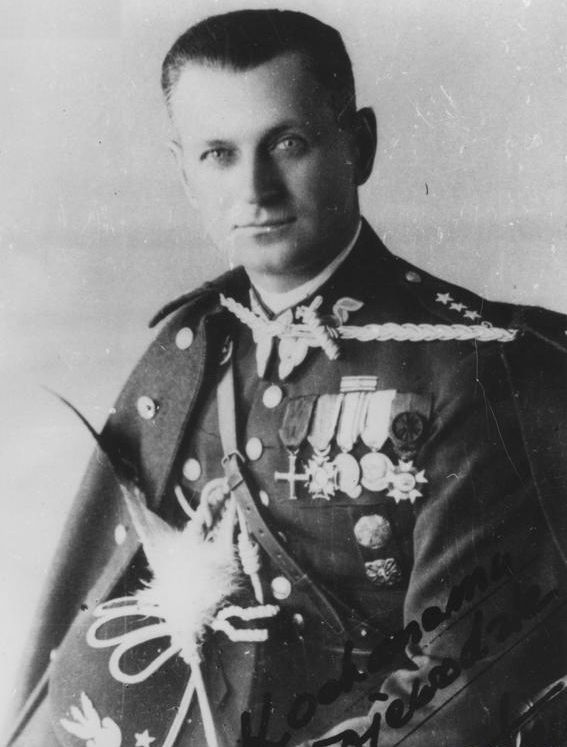
- Captain Józef Hartman (c. 1935)
- Born: Józef Sławomir Hartman; 27 October 1898; Swaryszów, Congress Poland, Russian Empire
- Died: 24 April 1979 (aged 80); London, England, United Kingdom
- Burial place: St Mary's Catholic Cemetery, Kensal Green, London
- Spouse: Grace Leborgne (m. 1947–1974)
- Military career
- Allegiance: Poland
- Branch: Polish Army; Polish Armed Forces in the West
- Service years: 1917–1948
- Rank: Lieutenant colonel (1944); Colonel (in exile, 1964)
- Nicknames: "Roch", "Sławek", "Tata" ("Dad")
- Units: 25th Infantry Regiment; 4th Legions Infantry Regt. 1st Legions Infantry Regiment; 2nd Podhale Rifles Regiment
- Commands: Polish Section, SOE STS 43 Audley End; Training Division, Section VI, Polish General Staff
- Conflicts: Polish–Soviet War; Battle of Grodno; World War II; Invasion of Poland
- Awards: Silver Cross of the Virtuti Militari; Commander's Cross of Polonia Restituta; Honorary Officer of the Order of the British Empire (UK); Officer of the Legion of Honour (France); Officer of the Order of the Crown (Belgium); Cross of Independence; Cross of Valour (3 times)

Józef Sławomir Hartman (27 October 1898 – 24 April 1979), noms de guerre "Roch", "Sławek", and "Tata", was a Polish Army officer, a lieutenant colonel of infantry in the Polish Armed Forces in the West, promoted to colonel in exile in 1964. From 1934 to 1939, he served as personal aide-de-camp to Polish President Ignacy Mościcki. During World War II, he was assigned to Section VI of the Polish General Staff in London and served as the Polish commandant of Special Training School 43 (STS 43) at Audley End House in Essex, the primary commando training facility operated by the British Special Operations Executive (SOE) for the Cichociemni paratroopers of the underground Home Army. From December 1943, he directed the Training Division of Section VI, overseeing the preparation and dispatch of airborne agents into occupied Poland. His mentorship of the candidates earned him the designation in Polish military historiography as the "Father of the Cichociemni" (Ojciec Cichociemnych).

== Early life and Polish–Soviet War ==
Józef Sławomir Hartman was born on 27 October 1898 in the village of Swaryszów, in Jędrzejów County, then part of the Kielce Governorate of Congress Poland within the Russian Empire. He was the son of Karol Hartman and Małgorzata (née Białek), growing up with four brothers (Antoni, Stanisław, Jan, and Tadeusz) and a sister, Jadwiga. He completed his primary and secondary schooling in Jędrzejów and Warsaw.

In 1915, at the age of sixteen, Hartman joined the clandestine pro-independence Polish Military Organisation (Polska Organizacja Wojskowa, POW), adopting the nom de guerre "Roch", and served as commander of the POW Jędrzejów District. On 27 October 1917, he enlisted as a sergeant in the 25th Infantry Regiment forming under the Regency Council.

Following the restoration of Polish independence in November 1918, Hartman joined the newly established Polish Army and was assigned in 1919 to the 4th Legions Infantry Regiment in Kielce. During the Polish–Soviet War (1919–1920), he served on the front line with the regiment, participating in operations in the eastern borderlands and in the Battle of Grodno in September 1920. He was wounded twice in combat during the campaign.

== Interwar period and presidential aide ==
After demobilization following the Treaty of Riga, Hartman remained on active service as a regular infantry officer in the 1st Legions Infantry Regiment in Vilnius, and was promoted to lieutenant with seniority from 1 July 1923 (ranking 57th in 1923, 55th in 1924, and 43rd in 1928). In February 1925, he was reassigned from the 1st Legions Infantry Regiment to the Maneuver Battalion in Rembertów as supply officer. He was promoted to the rank of captain with seniority from 1 January 1932 (ranking 94th), serving at that time in the Department of Infantry of the Ministry of Military Affairs in Warsaw, and was subsequently posted to the 2nd Podhale Rifles Regiment in Sanok.

On 24 January 1934, upon the recommendation of Marshal Józef Piłsudski, Hartman was appointed personal aide-de-camp to the President of Poland, Ignacy Mościcki, serving within the Military Chancellery of the President. He held this appointment continuously for nearly six years until the outbreak of World War II. In this capacity, Hartman accompanied President Mościcki at official state ceremonies, diplomatic receptions, and military inspections, including state visits by King Carol II of Romania and Crown Prince Michael in 1937, King Leopold III of Belgium, and Italian Foreign Minister Galeazzo Ciano in early 1939. In his Podhale Rifles uniform, complete with traditional cape and feather, Hartman appeared regularly in European newsreels, diplomatic press coverage, and photographic documentation. On 19 March 1939, he was promoted to major of infantry with seniority from 19 March 1939 (rank 131).

Following the German Invasion of Poland on 1 September 1939, Major Hartman coordinated presidential security and accompanied President Mościcki during the eastward evacuation across Poland. On the night of 17–18 September 1939, following the Soviet invasion of Poland, he crossed the border into Romania at Kuty with the presidential convoy. Interned by Romanian authorities alongside Mościcki at Craiova and later Bicaz, Hartman kept a daily war diary documenting diplomatic negotiations and the transfer of presidential authority to Władysław Raczkiewicz. In late December 1939, after Mościcki received permission to leave Romania, Hartman escorted the former president through Italy to neutral Switzerland.

== World War II and the Special Operations Executive ==
=== Assignment to Section VI and STS 43 Audley End ===
In early 1940, Hartman reported to France to rejoin the reconstituted Polish Armed Forces in France. Following the fall of France in June 1940, he evacuated to the United Kingdom. He was assigned to Section VI of the Polish General Staff in London, the specialized department responsible for liaison, radio communications, air supply drops, and clandestine agent infiltration into occupied Poland in support of the Union of Armed Struggle (ZWZ) and later the Home Army (Armia Krajowa).

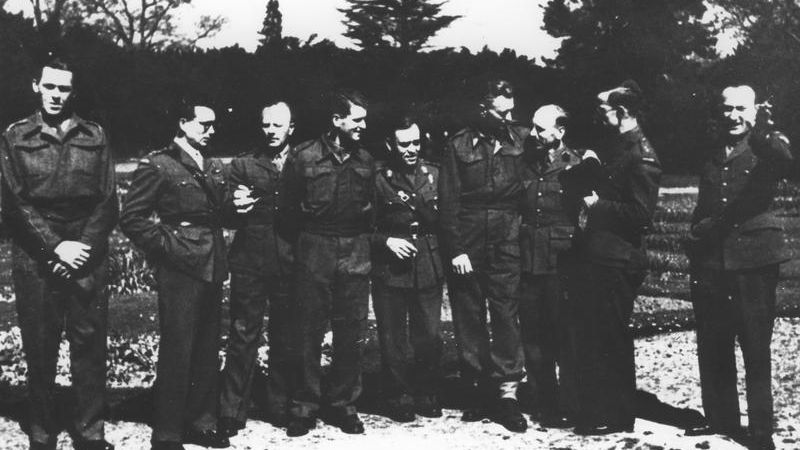
Major Józef Hartman (sixth from left) with Polish instructional officers of the Cichociemni in Great Britain

In 1942, Hartman was appointed the Polish commandant of Special Training School 43 (STS 43), situated at Audley End House near Saffron Walden in Essex. STS 43 operated as a joint Anglo-Polish training establishment under the authority of the Special Operations Executive (SOE). Command of the station was shared between Hartman, who directed the Polish instructional cadre, candidate selection, and discipline, and Lieutenant Colonel Terry Roper-Caldbeck of the British Army, who served as British station commander handling administration, security, logistics, and weapons supply.

=== Commando syllabus and the "Father of the Cichociemni" ===
Audley End served as the primary finishing school for the Cichociemni ("The Silent Unseen") before their airborne deployment into occupied Poland. Under Hartman's supervision, the commando curriculum covered:

- Unarmed combat and silent killing techniques developed by William E. Fairbairn and Eric A. Sykes;
- Demolitions and sabotage operations directed against railway lines, industrial facilities, and communication nodes;
- Marksmanship with Allied, German, and Soviet firearms, including combat shooting under low-light conditions;
- Lock-picking, forgery detection, clandestine concealment, and microphotography;
- Parachute drop procedures conducted in coordination with STS 51 at RAF Ringway;
- Counter-interrogation methods designed to build psychological resistance against Gestapo torture.

Hartman rejected punitive discipline in favor of personal mentoring, regular consultation with candidates, and direct engagement with recruits during exercises. Trainees referred to him by the affectionate nickname "Tata" ("Dad") or "Papa", from which originated his designation within the Polish Armed Forces as the "Father of the Cichociemni" (Ojciec Cichociemnych).

=== Cichociemny oath and flight prohibition ===
Hartman completed the mandatory parachute jumping qualification at RAF Ringway and completed the clandestine warfare curriculum. On 1 April 1941, he was formally sworn in as an underground operative of the ZWZ, taking the Cichociemny oath and adopting the operational pseudonym "Sławek".

However, the Commander-in-Chief, General Władysław Sikorski, and the British SOE leadership prohibited Hartman from being dropped into occupied territory. Because Hartman had spent nearly six years as the personal aide-de-camp to President Mościcki, his photograph had appeared widely in European newspapers, journals, and newsreels. Military authorities determined that his face was familiar to German counterintelligence, making his infiltration an unacceptable security risk that could compromise resistance networks.

=== Training notable operatives and memorial roses ===
During his tenure at STS 43, Hartman oversaw the training of scores of operatives among the 316 Cichociemni dropped into occupied Poland. Among those trained under his command were Jan Piwnik ("Ponury"), who subsequently led major partisan units in the Holy Cross Mountains, and Elżbieta Zawacka ("Zo"), courier of the Home Army General Headquarters and the only female Cichociemna.

Hartman maintained personal records of the recruits sent into the field. Whenever official notification reached London that an operative had been killed in action or executed by the Gestapo in Poland, Hartman planted a red rose bush in the garden of his English residence in memory of the fallen soldier.

=== Chief of Training of Section VI ===
On 1 March 1944, Hartman was promoted to lieutenant colonel. In December 1943, he was transferred from Audley End to General Staff headquarters in London, assuming the post of Chief of the Training Division (Wydział Wyszkolenia, Section "W") of Section VI. In this capacity, he directed the overarching preparation of all specialized personnel, couriers, and supply missions flown to occupied Poland until the formal cessation of operations in 1945.

== Postwar life and death ==
Following the conclusion of World War II and the Soviet-backed communist consolidation in Poland, Hartman chose to remain in exile in the United Kingdom. He was appointed head of the Liquidation Commission of Section VI of the Polish General Staff, where he cataloged personnel files, operational logs, and decoration citations of the Cichociemni to ensure the preservation of their wartime service records. He completed his active military duties and was demobilized on 13 August 1948.

On 15 February 1947, Hartman married Grace Leborgne (née Grace, 1908–1974), the British widow of an English test pilot. The couple lived in London. In civilian life, Hartman remained active in Polish emigre community institutions and veterans' organizations, particularly the Polish Home Army Association (Koło Armii Krajowej) and the Polish Paratroopers' Association.

In 1964, Hartman was promoted to the rank of colonel by the Polish authorities in exile.

Hartman died on 24 April 1979 in London, at the age of eighty. He was buried alongside his wife, Grace, at St Mary's Catholic Cemetery, Kensal Green in northwest London.

== Military ranks ==
Rank	Date of rank	Seniority	Formations and notes	Citation
Sergeant	27 October 1917	—	25th Infantry Regiment	
Second lieutenant	1919	—	Polish Army	
Lieutenant	1923	1 July 1923 (rank 57)	1st Legions Infantry Regiment	
Captain	1932	1 January 1932 (rank 94)	Department of Infantry, MSWojsk.	
Major	19 March 1939	19 March 1939 (rank 131)	Military Chancellery of the President	
Lieutenant colonel	1 March 1944	1 March 1944	Polish Armed Forces in the West	
Colonel	1964	1 January 1964	Postwar promotion in exile	

== Honours and awards ==
=== Polish honours ===
- Silver Cross of the Virtuti Militari (Fifth Class)
- Order of Polonia Restituta:
  - Knight's Cross – 11 November 1937
  - Officer's Cross – 11 November 1974
  - Commander's Cross (posthumously) – 6 June 1979
- Cross of Independence – 28 December 1933
- Cross of Valour (three times)
- Gold Cross of Merit with Swords
- Silver Cross of Merit – 10 November 1928
- Commemorative Medal for the War of 1918–1921 (Medal Pamiątkowy za Wojnę 1918–1921)
- Medal of the Decade of Regained Independence (Medal Dziesięciolecia Odzyskanej Niepodległości)
- Wound Badge (with two wound stars)

=== Foreign honours ===
- Honorary Officer of the Order of the British Empire (OBE, Military Division, United Kingdom)
- Defence Medal (United Kingdom) – 1947
- War Medal 1939–1945 (United Kingdom) – 1947
- Officer of the Legion of Honour (France) – 1939
- Officer of the Order of the Crown (Belgium) – 1935
- Officer of the Order of the Star of Romania (Romania) – 1938
- Order of the Crown of Romania (Romania)
- Order of the Estonian Red Cross, 1st Class (Estonia; recorded as 3rd Class in Polish military records) – 1935
- Officer of the Order of the Cross of the Eagle (Estonia) – 1936

== See also ==
- Audley End House
- Cichociemni
- Special Operations Executive
- Jan Piwnik
- Elżbieta Zawacka
