= Battle of Moczulanka =

- Part of the Massacres of the Poles in the Volhynia and Galicia during the Polish–Ukrainian ethnic conflict in the World War II
Date	16 November 1943
Location	Moczulanka
Result	Polish victory

Belligerents
Polish Self–Defense; Home Army; Soviet partisans	Ukrainian Insurgent Army

Commanders and leaders
Władysław Kochański; Captain Kotlarov	Ivan Litvinchuk

Strength
Unknown	1,200

Casualties and losses
Dozen killed	54 killed 40+ wounded

The Battle of Moczulanka was an armed clash that took place on November 16, 1943, in the village of Moczulanka, between an Home Army unit and a group of Soviet partisans composed of Poles against a unit of the Ukrainian Insurgent Army.

== Battle ==
On November 16, 1943, taking advantage of the absence of the "Bomba" unit in the village, which had set off on an action against the Germans, UPA units numbering about 1,200 men attacked the self-defense center from the east. Heavy fighting lasted the entire day. The balance of forces changed with the return of the "Bomba" unit, which attacked the Ukrainians near Moczulanka, and the attack on the UPA units by Soviet partisans under the command of Captain Kotlarov. The defeated and scattered UPA members lost 54 dead and about 40 wounded. Poles lost dozen killed.

== Aftermath ==
While retreating from Stara Huta, UPA forces killed approximately 15 Polish residents of the Bielczakowska colony.
