= Battle of Surkonty =

Battle between Poland and the Soviet Union in 1944

- Part of anti-communist resistance in Poland (1944–1953)
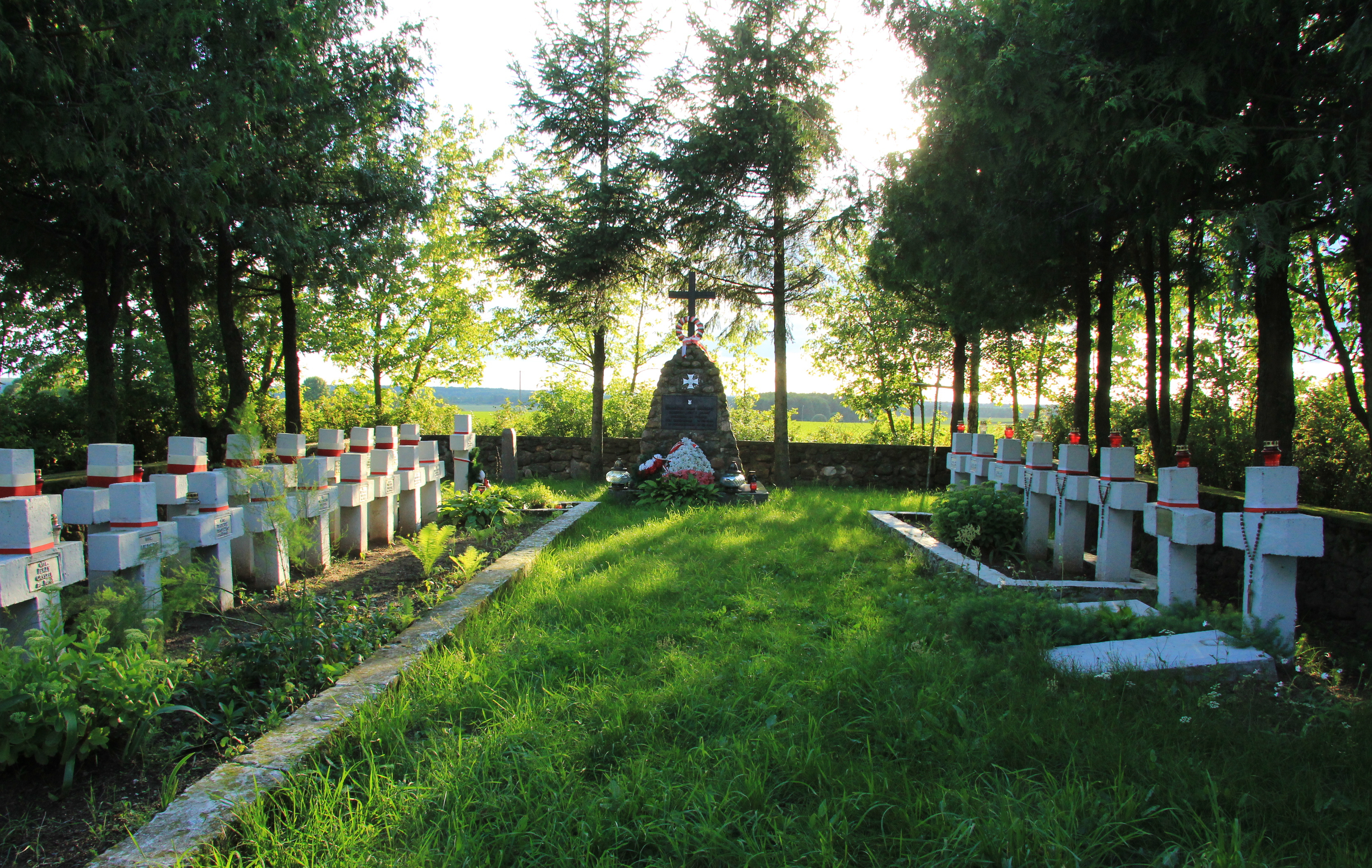
Date	August 21, 1944
Location	Surkonty, General Government
Result	Soviet victory

Belligerents
Red Army; NKVD	Home Army

Commanders and leaders
Unknown	Colonel Kalenkiewicz †

Units involved
3rd Battalion of the 32nd Motorized Regiment (NKVD)	Unknown

Strength
	36 AK members

Casualties and losses
132 killed	35 killed (20 of whom were bayoneted to death), 1 wounded

The Battle of Surkonty took place on 21 August 1944. It is regarded as the first clash between the Polish Home Army and regular forces of the Red Army, supported by the NKVD.

The battle occurred in forests near the village of Surkonty, 20 kilometres (12 mi) northeast of Grodno, in the territory of Belarus, and resulted in a Polish defeat. The Soviets lost 132 men KIA, while Polish losses were 35 KIA (including local commandant, Colonel Maciej “Kotwicz” Kalenkiewicz) and 1 WIA.

== Battle ==
In late June 1944, the unit of Kotwicz left the area of Grodno, and headed eastwards, to join Home Army forces from Stolpce in order to fight together in Operation Ostra Brama. On 13 July, the Home Army of the Vilnius Region, together with the Red Army, freed the city from the German invaders. Soon afterwards, the NKVD began arresting Polish soldiers, and as a result of this action, the local headquarters of the Home Army ordered all men to withdraw to the countryside.

On 18 July, at the edge of Rūdninkai forest, some 6,000 Home Army soldiers concentrated, together with 12,000 civilian refugees. They were soon spotted by Soviet aircraft, so it was decided that the soldiers should be divided into smaller groups, and march towards Białystok. The unit of Maciej Kalenkowicz remained in the forest for a while, but under Soviet pressure, it had to retreat southwest.

On 21 August, the Poles were attacked by the 3rd Battalion of the 32nd Motorized Regiment of the NKVD. The battle lasted five hours: Colonel Kalenkowicz was killed, together with 32 others, twenty of whom were bayoneted to death.

The Battle of Surkonty is commemorated on the Tomb of the Unknown Soldier, Warsaw, with the inscription "SURKONTY 21 VIII 1944".

== Cemetery ==
The graves of the Polish fighters who died in the battle are located in a cemetery near the village of Surkonty.

The cemetery was created in 1991 and its inauguration was attended by around 2,000 people, half from Poland and half from the local district.

It is alleged by Poland that, in August 2022, the graves have been destroyed by the authorities of Belarus.

== Sources ==
- Wyklęte życiorysy. Poznań: Dom Wydawniczy Rebis. ISBN 978-83-7510-373-1.
