= Maciej Kalenkiewicz =

Polish engineer & lieutenant colonel (1906–1944)

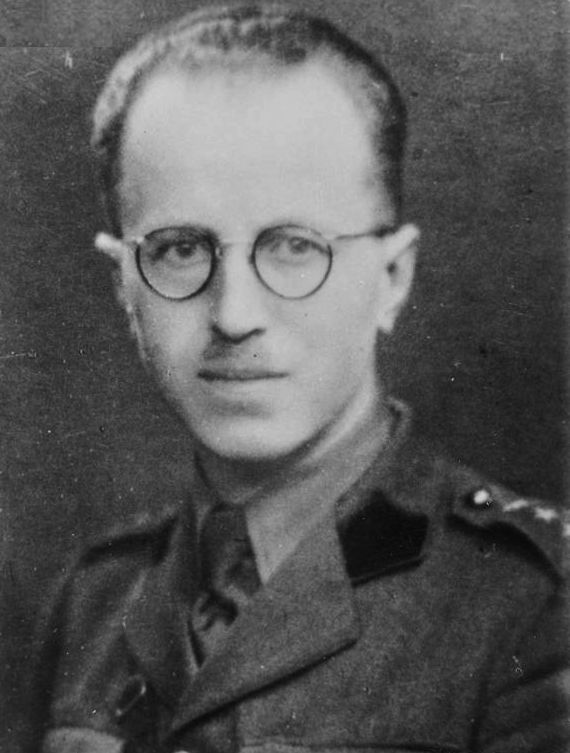
- Nicknames: Bóbr, Kotwica, Kotwicz, Maciej, M.K., Jan Kotwicz, Maciej Kotwicz, Jan Kaczmarek, Franciszek Tomaszewicz
- Born: July 1, 1906; Pacewicze, Russian Empire
- Died: August 21, 1944 (aged 38) Surkonty, General Government
- Rank: Lieutenant colonel
- Conflicts: World War II; Battle of Grodno; Anti-German insurgency; Battle of Surkonty †

Maciej Kalenkiewicz (Polish pronunciation: [ˈmat͡ɕɛj kalɛnˈkʲɛvit͡ʂ]; 1906–1944; nom de guerre Kotwicz) was a Polish engineer and lieutenant colonel of the Polish Army. During World War II was a soldier of Henryk Dobrzański's military unit, member of cichociemni, officer of the Home Army, partisan commander in the Nowogródek District of the Home Army.

== Biography ==
=== Early years ===
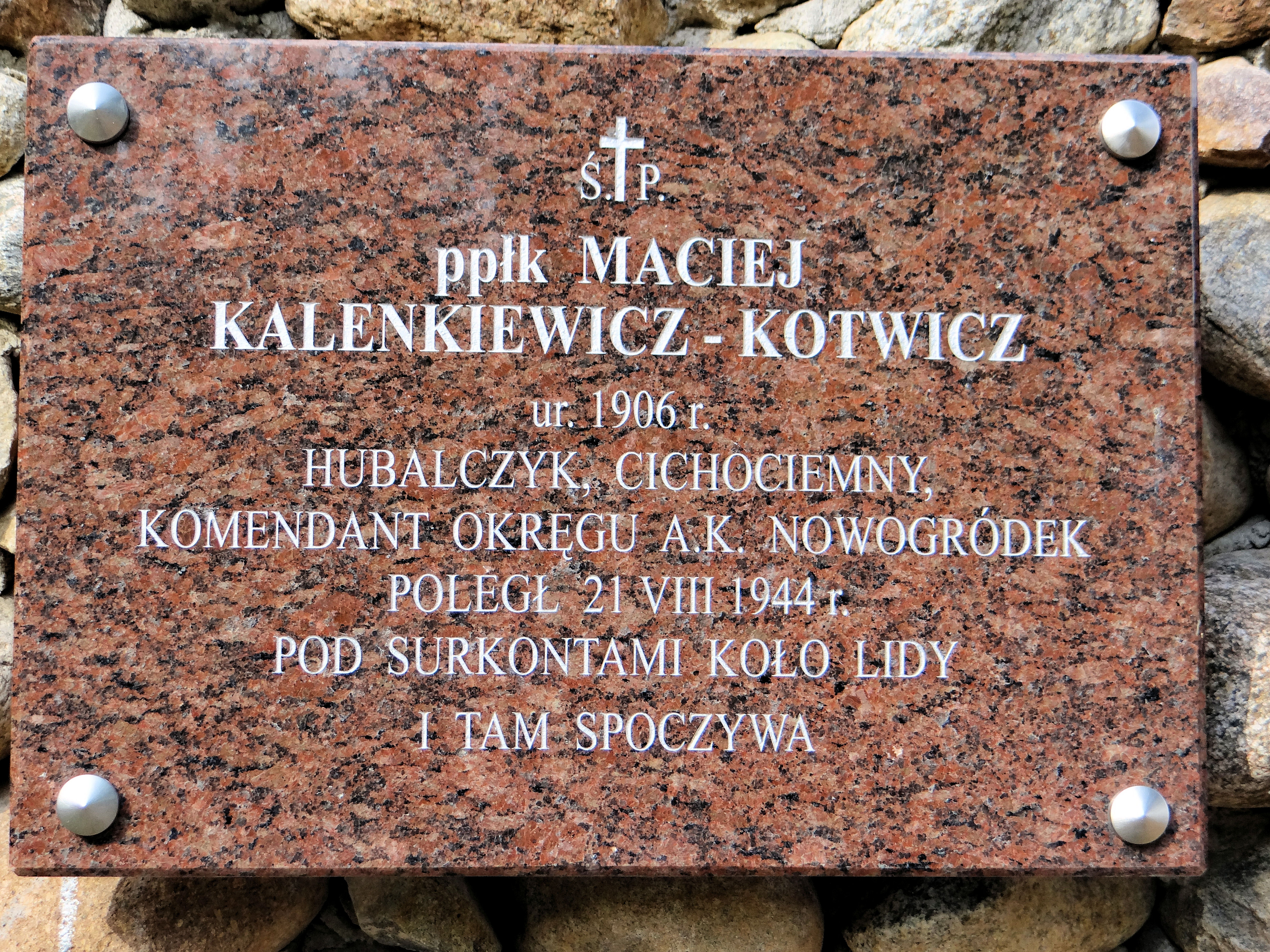
Commemorative plaque of Lieutenant Colonel Maciej Kalenkiewicz

Maciej Kalenkiewicz was born July 1, 1906, in a small manor in Pacewicze, to Jan Kalenkiewicz, an impoverished member of the Polish gentry and a peasant politician, and Helena née Zawadzka. He graduated from a gymnasium in Vilna (modern Vilnius) and then the Cadet Corps in Modlin. In 1924 he was admitted to the Officer Engineering School in Warsaw, where he took part in the May Coup d'État on the side of the government. In 1927 he graduated as an engineer, with the best marks at his year. After a yearly practice in the prestigious Modlin-based 1st Engineering Regiment, he applied for the faculty of Land Engineering of the Warsaw University of Technology. In 1934 he married Irena née Erdman and graduated as a qualified engineer.

He returned to active service and was attached to the Engineering NCO School in Modlin as a platoon commander. In 1936 he was promoted to the rank of kapitan and in 1938 he was allowed to join the Higher War School in Warsaw. However, his studies there were interrupted by the outbreak of World War II.

=== Among the first partisans of World War II ===
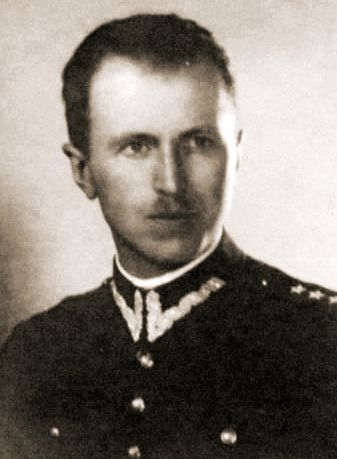
Capt. Maciej Kalenkiewicz before 1939

During the Polish Defensive War of 1939, Kalenkiewicz served in the staff of the Suwałki Cavalry Brigade, as part of the Narew Independent Operational Group. He took part in his units delaying actions in northern Poland, but in mid-September, he volunteered for the improvised Polish 110th Uhlan Regiment under ppłk. Jerzy Dąbrowski Łupaszko. As part of the Reserve Cavalry Brigade the regiment took part in the defence of Wołkowysk against the assaulting Germans.

After the Soviet invasion of Poland of September 17, the regiment headed northwards, towards the border with Lithuania. It marched towards Grodno and Augustów Forest, where it fought several skirmishes against the German army and took part in the Battle of Grodno against the Red Army. After two days of heavy fights against the numerically superior Soviets, on September 20 Grodno was lost and three days later gen. bryg. Wacław Przeździecki, the commander of the defence of the Grodno area, ordered all his troops to escape to neutral Lithuania. The 110th Regiment was the only unit to disobey this order. The soldiers led by Dąmbrowski refused to leave the country and instead headed for besieged Warsaw.

The unit was joined with remnants of several routed regiments and fought its way towards Warsaw. The unit got surrounded by the Red Army in the Biebrza River area and suffered serious casualties, but managed to break through the enemy defences. After that ppłk. Dąmbrowski, the commander of the regiment, decided to disband it. Major Henryk Dobrzański took command over approximately 180 men and who decided to continue their march towards the besieged capital. Among his men was Maciej Kalenkiewicz, who became the chief of staff of the Detached Unit of the Polish Army, as the new unit was called. When Warsaw capitulated on September 27, Dobrzański decided to continue the fight against the foreign occupation of Poland. Approximately 50 men volunteered to stay in the army, while the rest were allowed to leave. On November 1, 1939, they crossed the Vistula near Dęblin and started their march towards the Holy Cross Mountains. The same day his unit fought the first skirmish against the Germans. After that, he decided to stay in the Kielce area with his unit and wait until the Allied relief comes, which he expected in the spring of 1940. Two days afterwards Kalenkiewicz became the deputy commander of what was to become the first partisan unit of World War II. He adopted a nom de guerre of Kotwicz, after the name of his family's coat of arms.

In November 1939 Kalenkiewicz reached Warsaw with a mission from Dobrzański to Gen. Michał Karaszewicz-Tokarzewski, the commander of the Służba Zwycięstwu Polski, the first major resistance organization formed in all parts of Nazi and Soviet-occupied Poland. However, he did not return to Dobrzański's unit and instead decided to find his way to France, where the Polish Army was being recreated by Gen. Władysław Sikorski.

=== In the West ===
In late 1939, through Hungary and Yugoslavia, Kalenkiewicz reached France. There, on January 1, 1940, he joined the Versailles based Officers Engineering Training Centre. Verified as a specialist in military engineering, since March 15 he was also a professor there. He also repeatedly proposed Gen. Kazimierz Sosnkowski to organize a group of paratroopers to be transported to occupied Poland for easier contact with the underground. In early May Sosnkowski admitted Kalenkiewicz to his own staff and on June 25 both were evacuated to Great Britain due to the French capitulation.

Considered a member of the informal faction of young officers insisting on reforming the Polish Army in exile into a highly trained specialized force rather than cannon fodder, Kalenkiewicz co-authored several memorials urging the Polish authorities to reform the standard infantry units into airborne units capable of both armed reconnaissance and diversion, and possible help in the envisioned all-national uprising in the German-occupied country. One of such memorials made Kalenkiewicz noted by Gen. Władysław Sikorski, who in October 1941 moved him to staff service in the newly established Airborne Training and Studies detachment of the Polish General Staff. One of the direct outcomes of the group's activities was the creation of the Polish 1st Independent Airborne Brigade under Gen. Stanisław Sosabowski. Kalenkiewicz also volunteered to be transported to occupied Poland and help the Home Army.

=== German-occupied Poland ===
On December 27, 1941, he was indeed transported to Poland during the air bridge operation code-named Jacket. By accident the pilot landed in the areas annexed by the Third Reich rather than in General Government (GG) and all the members of the team were arrested immediately upon their arrival. However, when transported to a local outpost of the German forces, the crew managed to recapture their arms and escape, killing all Germans. Kalenkiewicz and his team then managed to cross into the GG and reach Warsaw. There Kalenkiewicz met with Gen. Stefan Rowecki (Grot), who accepted him into the Department of Operations of the staff of the Association of Armed Struggle, the predecessor of the Home Army.

As a rule of thumb, all Cichociemni were promoted one grade upwards on their arrival to Poland and so Kalenkiewicz rose to the rank of Major. On March 19, 1942, he was also awarded Virtuti Militari, the highest Polish military award. As a staff officer, he was responsible for a variety of duties, mostly related to training in partisan warfare, sabotage and communications. He was also the author of Plan W, a plan of an all-national uprising on which the later Operation Tempest was based. In August 1943 Kalenkiewicz also took part in front-line operations as he was named the commander of the Operation Belt, a wide-scale operation aimed at all German border outposts between the GG and the Reich.

== In popular culture ==
In the film Hubal (1973) directed by Bohdan Poręba the role of Captain Maciej Kalenkiewicz was played by the actor Tadeusz Janczar.

== Sources ==
- Jan Erdman: Droga do Ostrej Bramy, Warszawa 1990
- Roman Korab-Żebryk: Operacja wileńska AK, PWN, Warszawa 1988, ISBN 83-01-08401-4
- Rocznik Oficerski z 1928, pp. 569, 606
