= Huta, Rivne Oblast =

Huta Гута
- Village
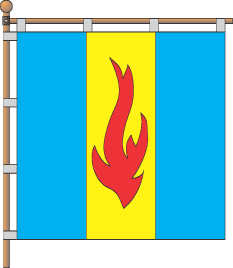
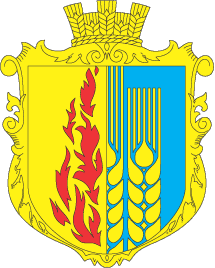
- Flag Coat of arms

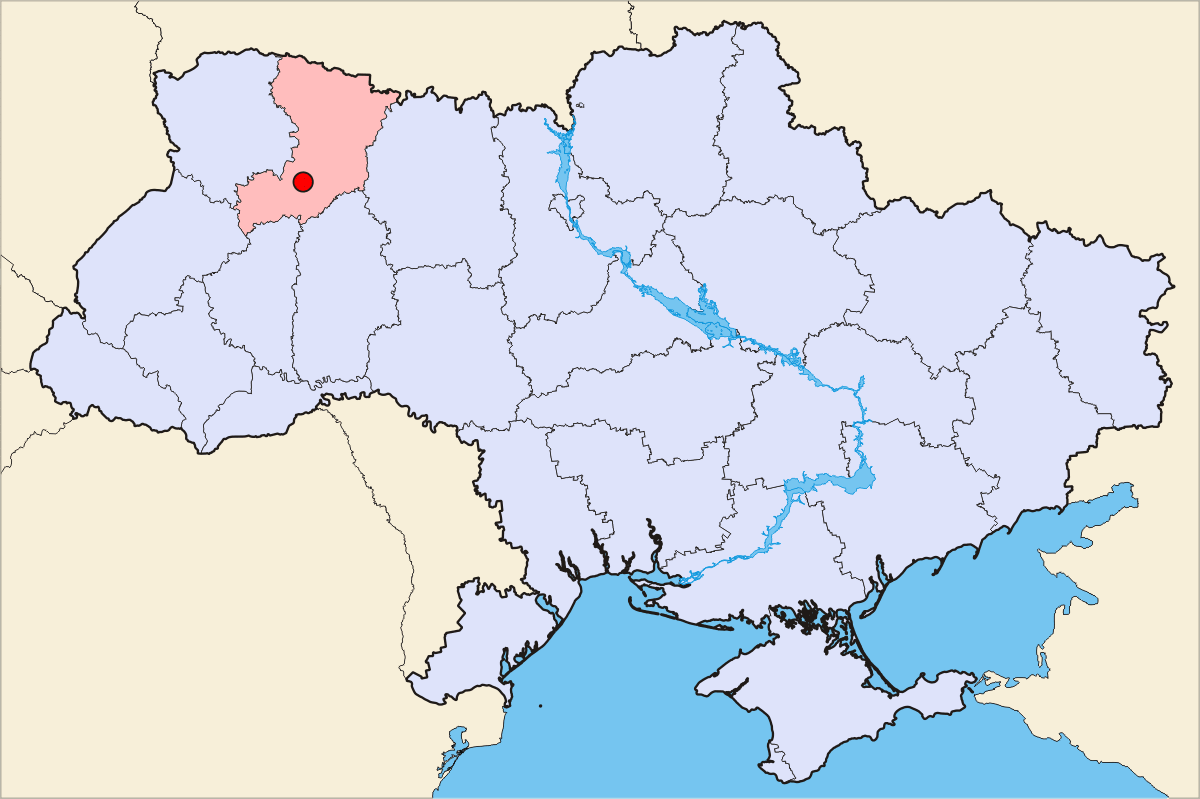
- Location within the Rivne Oblast
- Coordinates: 51°09′01″N 26°08′47″E
- Country: Ukraine
- Oblast: Rivne Oblast
- Raion: Rivne Raion
- Silska Rada: Huta Silska Rada
- Founded: 1918

Area
  - Total: 4.259 km^{2} (1.644 sq mi)
- Elevation: 170 m (560 ft)

Population (2001)
  - Total: 744
  - Density: 174/km^{2} (450/sq mi)
- Time zone: UTC+2 (EET)
  - Summer (DST): UTC+3 (EEST)
- Postal code: 35010
- Area code: +380 3657

Huta (Ukrainian: Гута Polish: Huta Stepańska) is a village in Rivne Raion, Rivne Oblast, Ukraine, but was formerly administered within Kostopil Raion. As of the year 2001, the community had 744 residents. Postal code — 35010. KOATUU code — 5623481201.

== History ==
The village of Huta Stepańska was founded in the end of the 17th century in the scorched areas of the Stepańska Wilderness. Its founders were members of the poor Polish noble family of Sawiccy, who had come there from Zhytomyr. In the registry books in the 19th century, the village is called Majdan, and on maps from before World War I, it is called Majdan Huta. The Geographical Dictionary of the Kingdom of Poland and Other Slavic Countries, issued in 1900 (volume XV, part I), describes the place as follows: “Huta Stepańska, a settlement, located 82 versts from Rivne. 71 houses, 208 inhabitants”.

In 1921, when Volhynia was incorporated into the Second Polish Republic, Huta Stepanska was included in the Kostopol county, Volhynian Voivodeship. According to the 1921 Polish census, it had 97 buildings and 539 inhabitants (489 Roman Catholics, 18 Orthodox, 31 Jews and 1 Protestant). In 1922, a Roman Catholic parish was opened there and after 1930 - a health resort, due to rich resources of salt and therapeutic mud, located there. By 1939, Huta Stepanska developed into a major center of northern Volhynia, with more than 200 houses and almost 1000 inhabitants.

=== World War II ===
After combined German and Soviet aggression on Poland, Huta Stepańska, together with whole Volhynian Voivodeship, was annexed by the Soviet Union and was incorporated into the Ukrainian Soviet Socialist Republic. Many inhabitants of this area were deported by the NKVD to Siberia, majority of those deported were Poles (see: Forced settlements in the Soviet Union).

In the summer of 1941, following Operation Barbarossa, Volhynia, together with Huta Stepanska, were incorporated into the Reichskommissariat Ukraine. Local Ukrainians started to organize themselves in paramilitary units, also first troops of the Ukrainian Insurgent Army began to appear in the area.

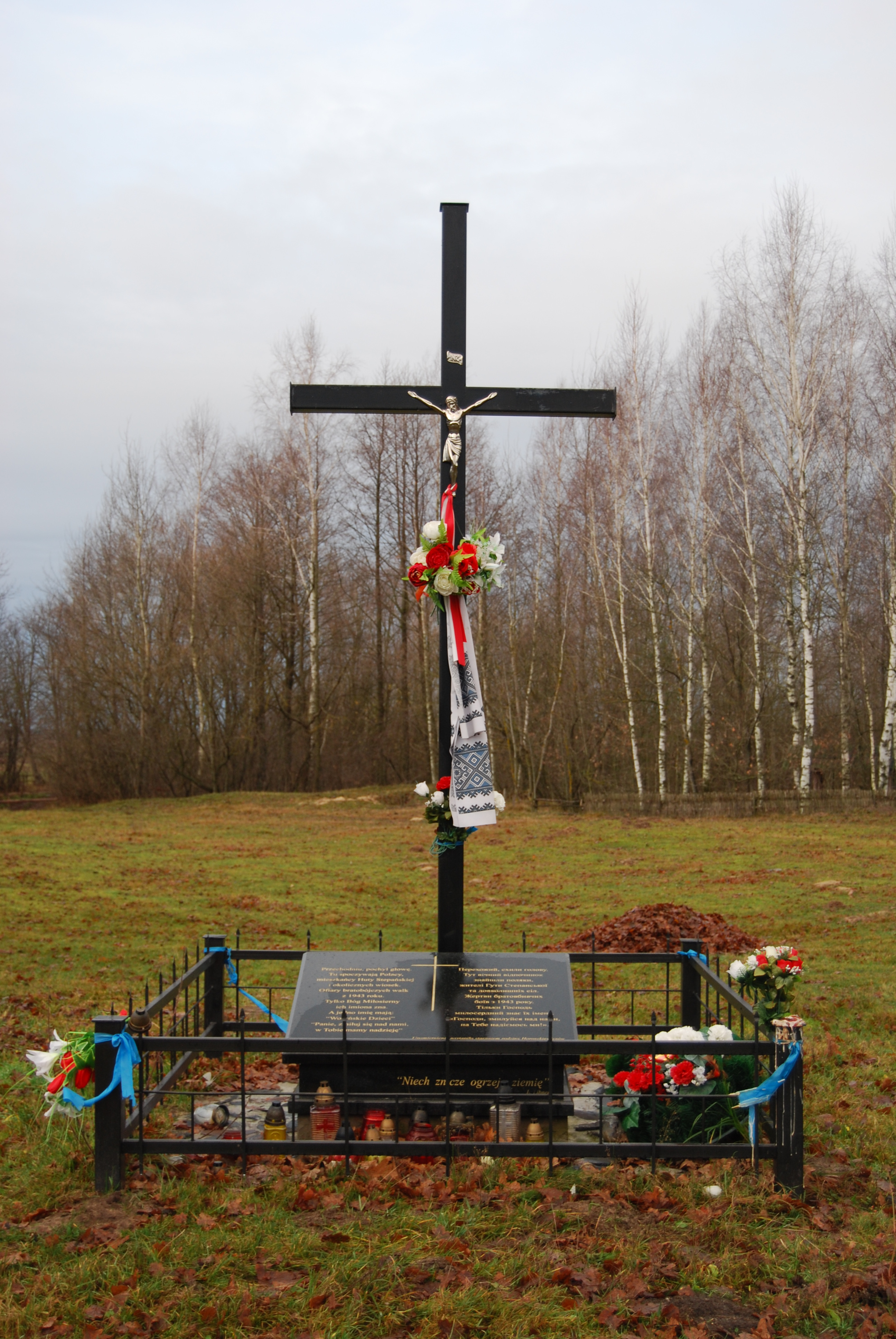
Huta Stepańska. Cross and memorial plaque on mass grave. 250 Polish victims were buried there until July 17, 1943

In late 1942 the UPA started attacking Polish settlements in Volhynia, and in the summer of 1943 the ethnic cleansing became widespread (see: Massacres of Poles in Volhynia). Since Huta Stepańska was a large village, surrounded by a Ukrainian majority, numerous Poles, survivors of the early massacres, gathered there. In the first weeks of summer of 1943, Huta Stepańska became one of the largest centres of Polish defence, with thousands of refugees living there in appalling conditions. Tadeusz Piotrowski estimates that up to 18,000 people found shelter there.

Establishment of the defence center, which was commanded by Captain Władysław Kochański, aka Bomba (he had been dropped over Poland in late 1942), and in which there also were Jews, serving in Polish units was soon noticed by the Ukrainians, who decided to destroy it. The attack on Huta Stepanska, preceded by burning fifteen smaller villages in the area, began on July 16, 1943, by troops commanded by Stepan Koval (aka Rubashenko, Burlak), who later said that it was carried out by order of Klym Savur.

Koval stated after the war:

In the summer of 1943, following orders of Klym Savur, I carried out operation of destruction of Polish population in the Rivne district. A UPA unit under my command destroyed villages of Rafałówka and Huta Stepańska, inhabited by the Poles. According to the order of Oleil, commanders of my battalions - Moroz, Bohdan and Rybak, liquidated Polish colonies and people there, such as Marianówka, Wólka Kotowska - Aleksandria and Zofiówka. We had two days and we managed to keep the schedule.

Huta Stepańska was abandoned and captured by the Ukrainians on July 18, two days after the attack started. Its Polish defenders, realizing that ammunition was in short supply, decided to break out of the encirclement and reach the nearby rail lines. During the evacuation, a panic broke out among Polish civilians, and the Ukrainians took advantage of it, killing from 300 to 600 persons (it is difficult to establish the number of victims). Survivors managed to fight their way through the Ukrainians and reached the railroad junction at the town of Sarny. Most of them were later forcibly taken to Germany, where they had to work for the German war economy as OST-Arbeiters.

== People from Huta Stepańska ==
- Ukrainian poet Petro Velesyk
- Polish army general Czesław Piotrowski
- Czesław Gawęda
