= Elżbieta Zawacka =

Polish freedom fighter (1909–2009)

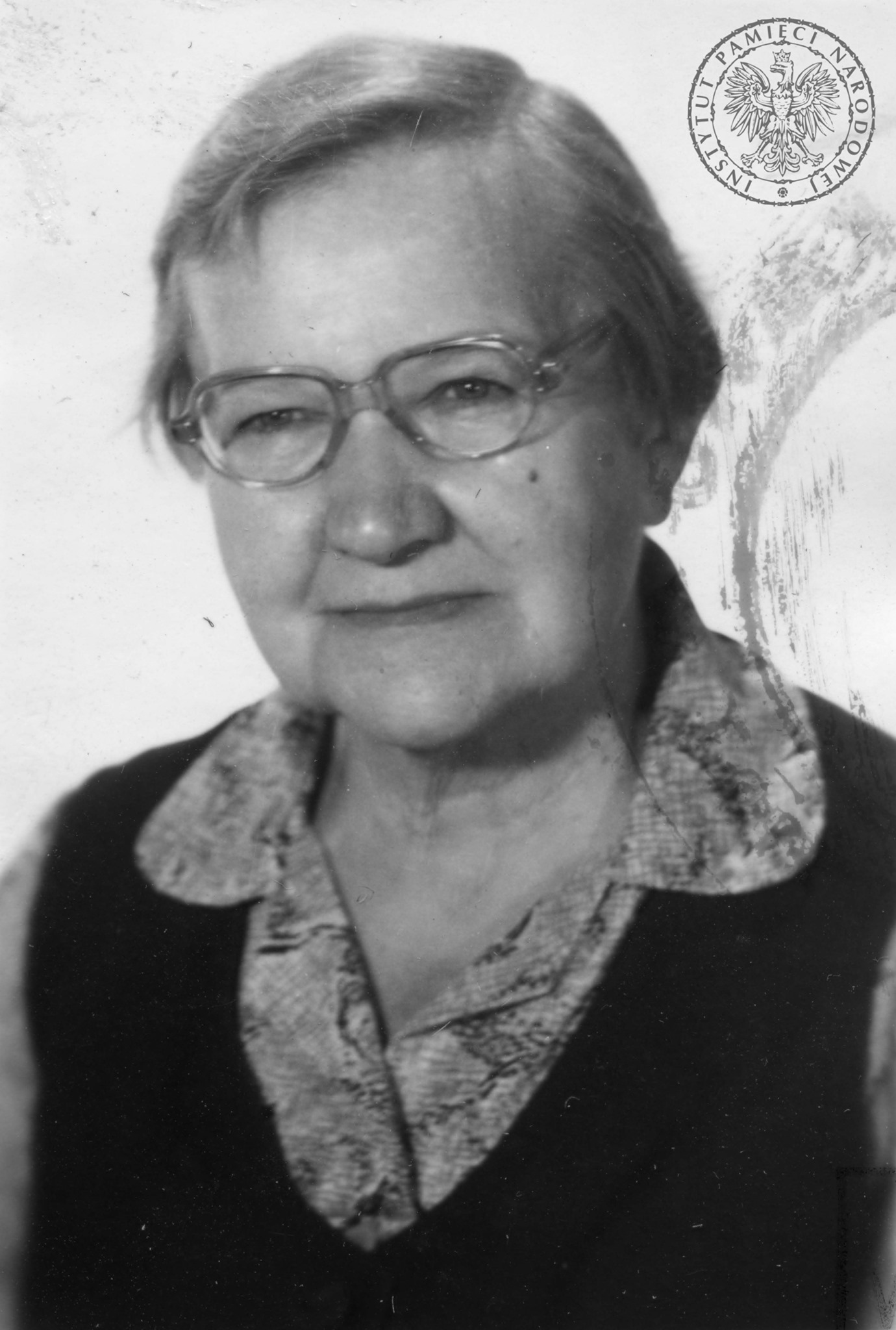
- Zawacka, 1984
- Born: 19 March 1909; Thorn, German Empire (today Toruń, Poland)
- Died: 10 January 2009 (aged 99); Toruń, Poland
- Military career
- Allegiance: Poland
- Branch: Polish Land Forces; Union of Armed Struggle (Związek Walki Zbrojnej)
- Service years: 1939–1945
- Rank: Generał brygady (Brigadier General)
- Nicknames: Zo, Zelma
- Conflicts: World War II
- Awards: Order of the White Eagle, Virtuti Militari, Krzyż Walecznych
- Other work: Freedom fighter, professor

Elżbieta Zawacka (Polish pronunciation: [ɛlˈʐbjɛta zaˈvat͡ska]; 19 March 1909 – 10 January 2009), known also by her war-time nom de guerre Zo, was a Polish freedom fighter during World War II, a Special Operations Executive (SOE) agent, and university professor. She was promoted to brigadier general of the Polish Land Forces (after Maria Wittek the second woman to hold this rank) by President Lech Kaczyński on 3 May 2006. Sometimes called "the only woman among the Cichociemni" (Silent Unseen), she served as a courier for the Polish Home Army, carrying letters and other documents from Nazi-occupied Poland to the Polish government-in-exile in London and back. Her regular route ran from Warsaw through Berlin and Sweden to London. She was also responsible for organizing routes for other couriers of the Home Army.

== Life ==
Zawacka was born in Toruń (German: Thorn), part of the Prussian Partition of Poland, and graduated from Poznań University in mathematics. When she was 10 years old, in 1919, her city Toruń returned to reborn Poland, which regained independence in 1918. She passed her high school diploma in Polish Toruń. In the late 1930s she taught at several secondary schools, simultaneously working as an instructor for Przysposobienie Wojskowe Kobiet (Women's Military Training). During the 1939 invasion of Poland, she was commandant of the Silesian-district Women's Military Training, participating in the defense of Lwów.

In October 1939 she joined the Silesian branch of the Union of Armed Struggle (Związek Walki Zbrojnej) under the nom de guerre "Zelma", which she later changed to "Zo". In late 1940 she was transferred to Warsaw and began performing courier journeys. She was also deputy head of Zagroda, the Home Army's Foreign Communication Department. In February 1943 she travelled across Germany, France, and Spain to Gibraltar, whence she was transported by air to London. In Britain she underwent parachute training, and on 10 September 1943 she dropped into Poland, said to be "the only woman in the history of the Silent Unseen". However, this is disputed, as she had not completed the full training course.

In 1944 Zawacka fought in the Warsaw Uprising, and after its defeat moved to Kraków, where she continued her underground activities. In 1945 she joined the anti-Communist organization Freedom and Independence (WiN), but quit soon afterwards and took up a teaching position.

In 1951 she was arrested and tortured by Urząd Bezpieczeństwa (Security Service of the Ministry of Internal Affairs). She was sentenced to 10 years in prison for treason and espionage, but her sentence was shortened and she was released in 1955. After her release from prison, she earned a doctorate degree from Gdańsk University. She was a tenured professor at the Institute of Pedagogy at Mikołaj Kopernik University in Toruń, where she established the department of andragogy. She retired from teaching in 1978 after the Polish Security Service (Służba Bezpieczeństwa) closed the department. She was an active member of the World Union of Home Army Soldiers and cooperated with Solidarność in the 1980s.

Zawacka died at the age of 99 in her home town Toruń on 10 January 2009.

Clare Mulley's biography of Zawacka, Agent Zo: The Untold Story of Fearless WW II Resistance Fighter Elżbieta Zawacka (Weidenfeld & Nicolson, 2024) won the Polish Foreign Ministry history book award 2024/25, took Silver in Military History Matters magazine's best book of 2025, was longlisted for the Historical Writers Association nonfiction prize, and shortlisted for the Women's Prize for Nonfiction 2025.

== Awards and decorations ==
- Order of the White Eagle (1995)
- Silver Cross of Order of Virtuti Militari, twice (10 September 1943, 2 October 1944)
- Commander's Cross with Star of the Order of Polonia Restituta (1993)
- Officer's Cross of the Order of Polonia Restituta (1990)
- Cross of Valour, five times (1941, 1942, 1943)
- Golden Cross of Merit with Swords (1944)
- Cross of Freedom and Solidarity (posthumously, 2017)
- Army Medal, four times (1970)
- Cross of the Home Army (1970)
- Cross of Combat Action of the Polish Armed Forces in the West (1991)
- Medal Pro Memoria (2005)

== Gallery ==
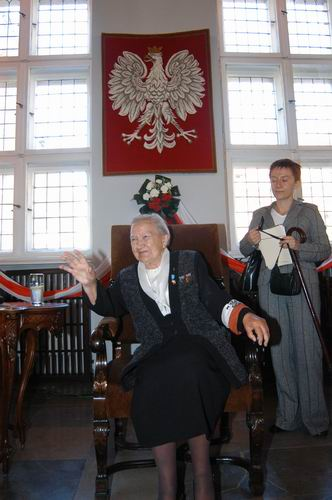
Zawacka, 2006

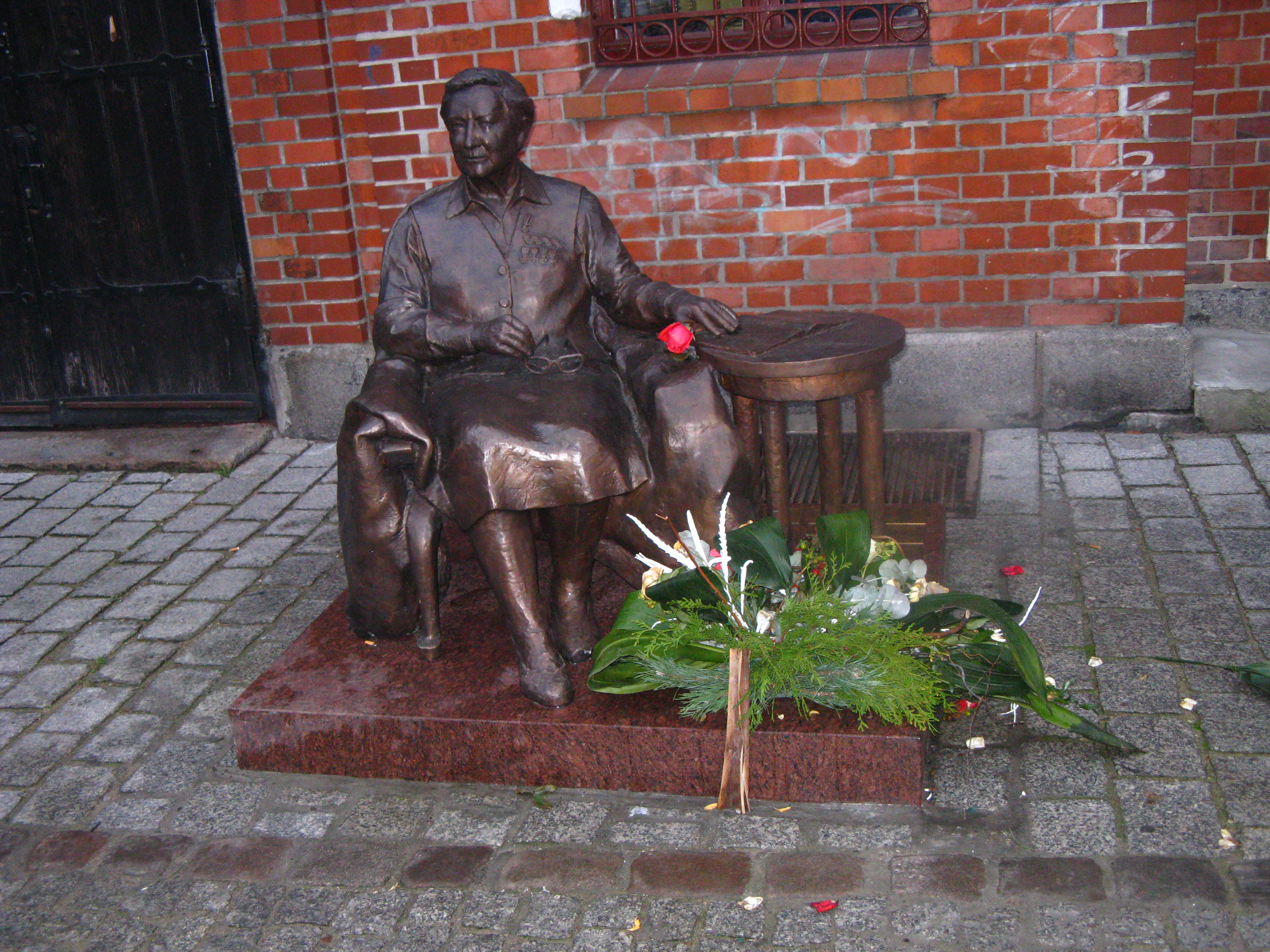
Monument to Zawacka, Elżbieta Zawacka Foundation, Toruń, unveiled 23 September 2014

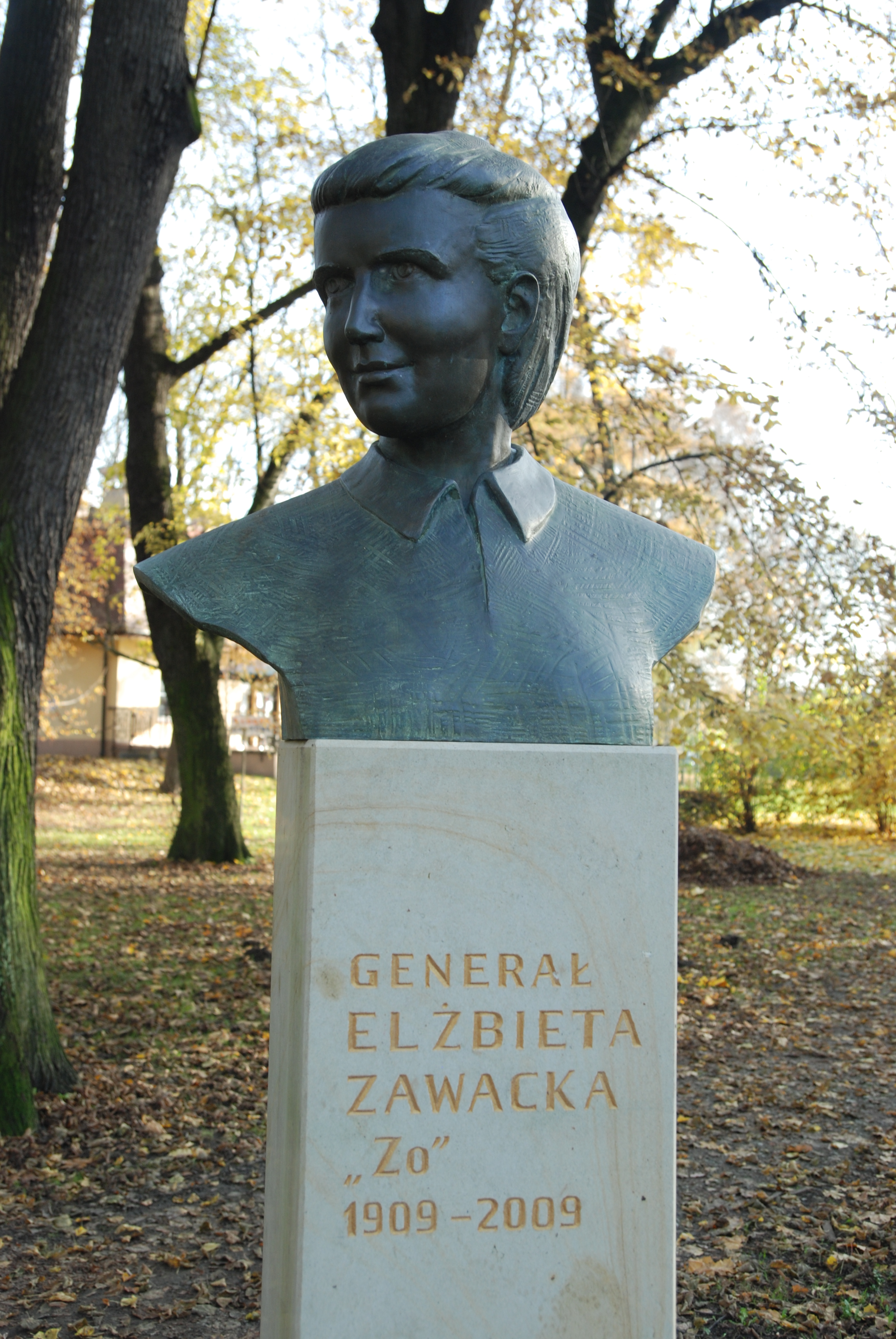
Bust in Henryk Jordan Park, Kraków

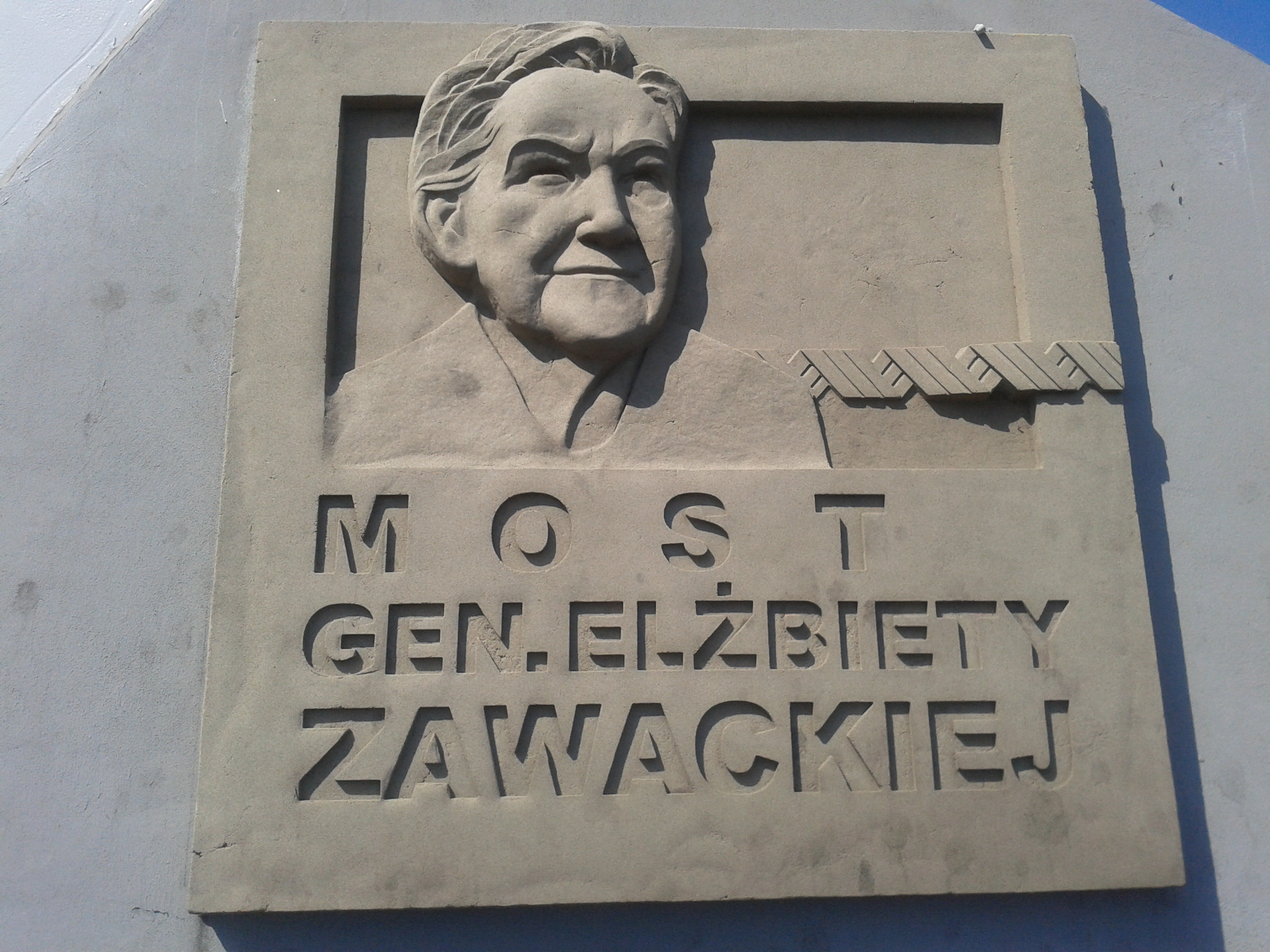
Plaque on Elżbieta Zawacka Bridge in Toruń

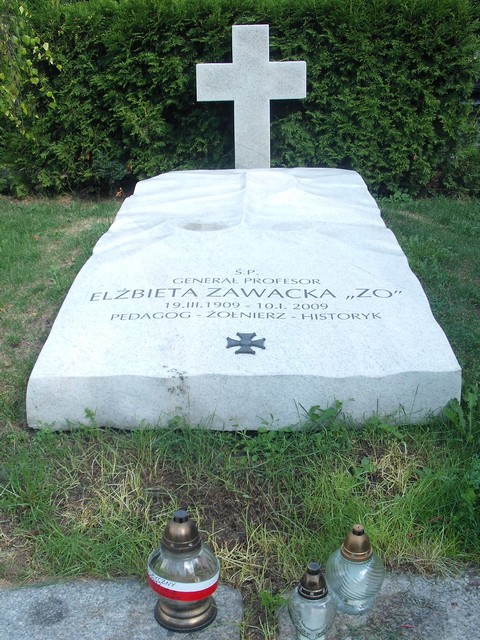
Grave of Zawacka in Toruń

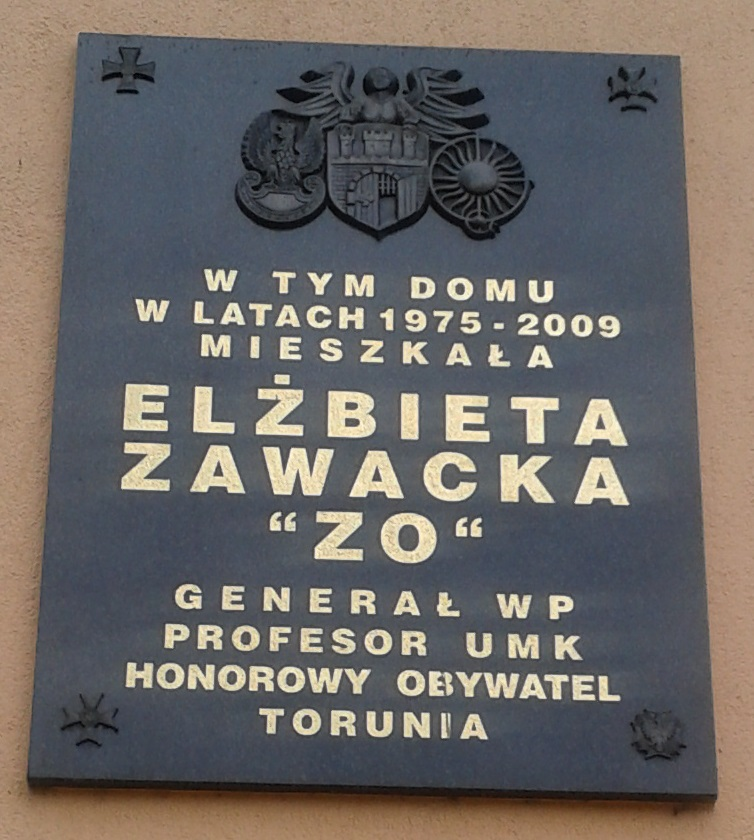
Commemorative plaque in Toruń

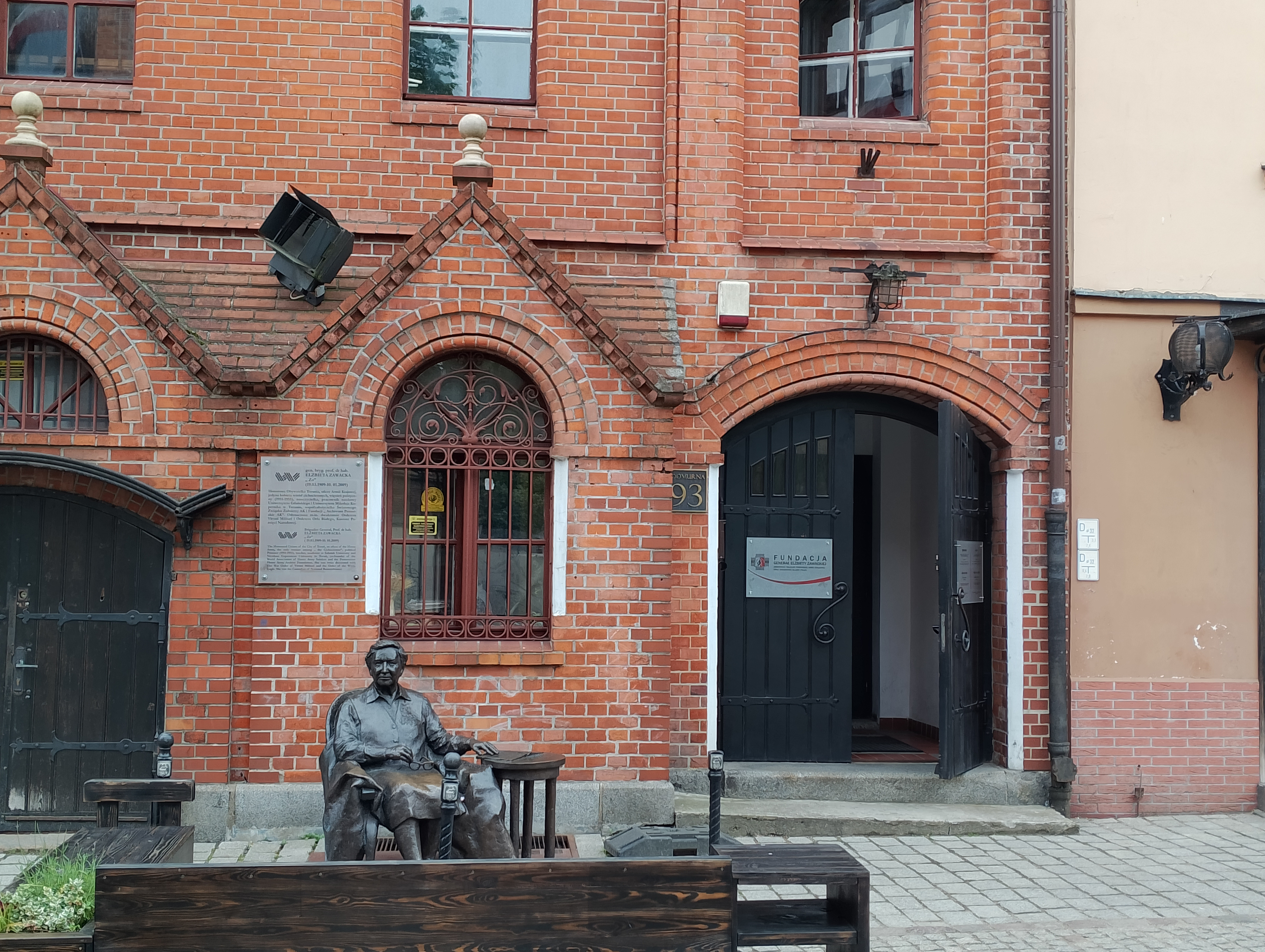
Elżbieta Zawacka Foundation headquarters in Toruń
