= Surkanty =

Village in Grodno Region, Belarus

Surkanty Сурканты (Belarusian)
- Village
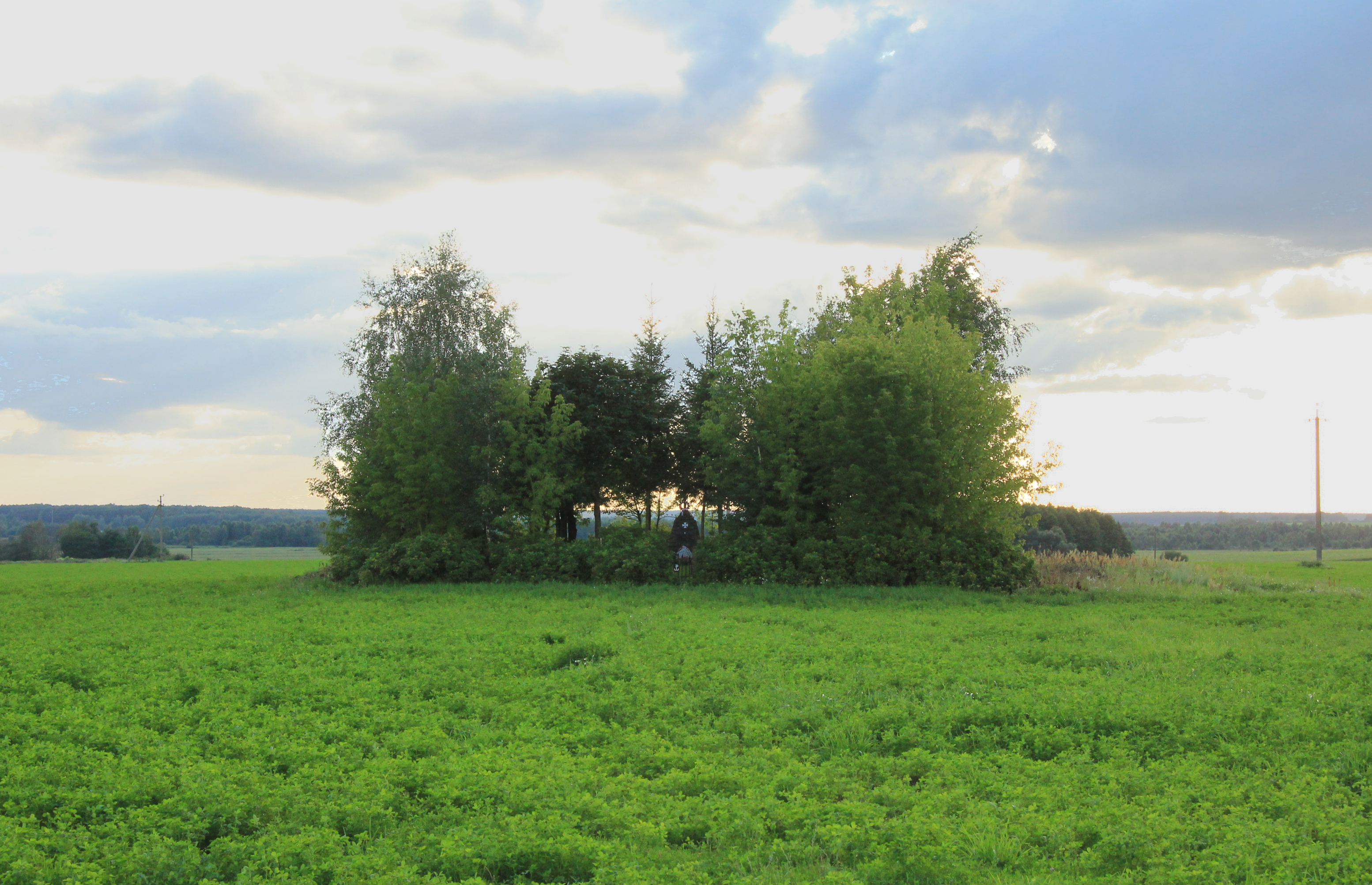
- Cemetery of the Home Army soldiers who died in the Battle of Surkanty in 2008

- Location within Belarus
- Coordinates: 53°56′41″N 24°58′33″E
- Country: Belarus
- Region: Grodno Region
- District: Voranava District
- Time zone: UTC+3 (MSK)

Surkanty (Russian: Сурканты; Russian: Сурконты, romanized: Surkonty; Polish: Surkonty) is a village in Voranava District, Grodno Region, Belarus. It is part of Boltsishki selsoviet.

== History ==
In the interwar period, the village was situated in Poland, in the Nowogródek Voivodeship, in the Lidzki County, in the Raduń Commune. After the Soviet invasion of Poland in 1939, the village became part of the BSSR. In the years 1941-1944 it was under German occupation. Then the village was again in the BSSR. From 1991 in the Republic of Belarus.

=== Battle of Surkonty ===
On August 21, 1944, a battle took place in the village between an NKVD battalion and a partisan unit of the Home Army under the command of Maciej Kalenkiewicz "Kotwicz", who died there. The funeral of the deceased Polish soldiers, for fear of the Soviets, took place not in the local cemetery, but in the field, near the cemetery of the January insurgents. The local residents did not allow the grave to be plowed for the kolkhoz. On September 8, 1991, the cemetery of Polish soldiers was opened. The inscriptions on the crosses were made in Polish, but the authorities did not agree to write with whom the deceased fought. On August 25, 2022, the Belarusian authorities leveled the cemetery using heavy machinery.
