= Silent Unseen =

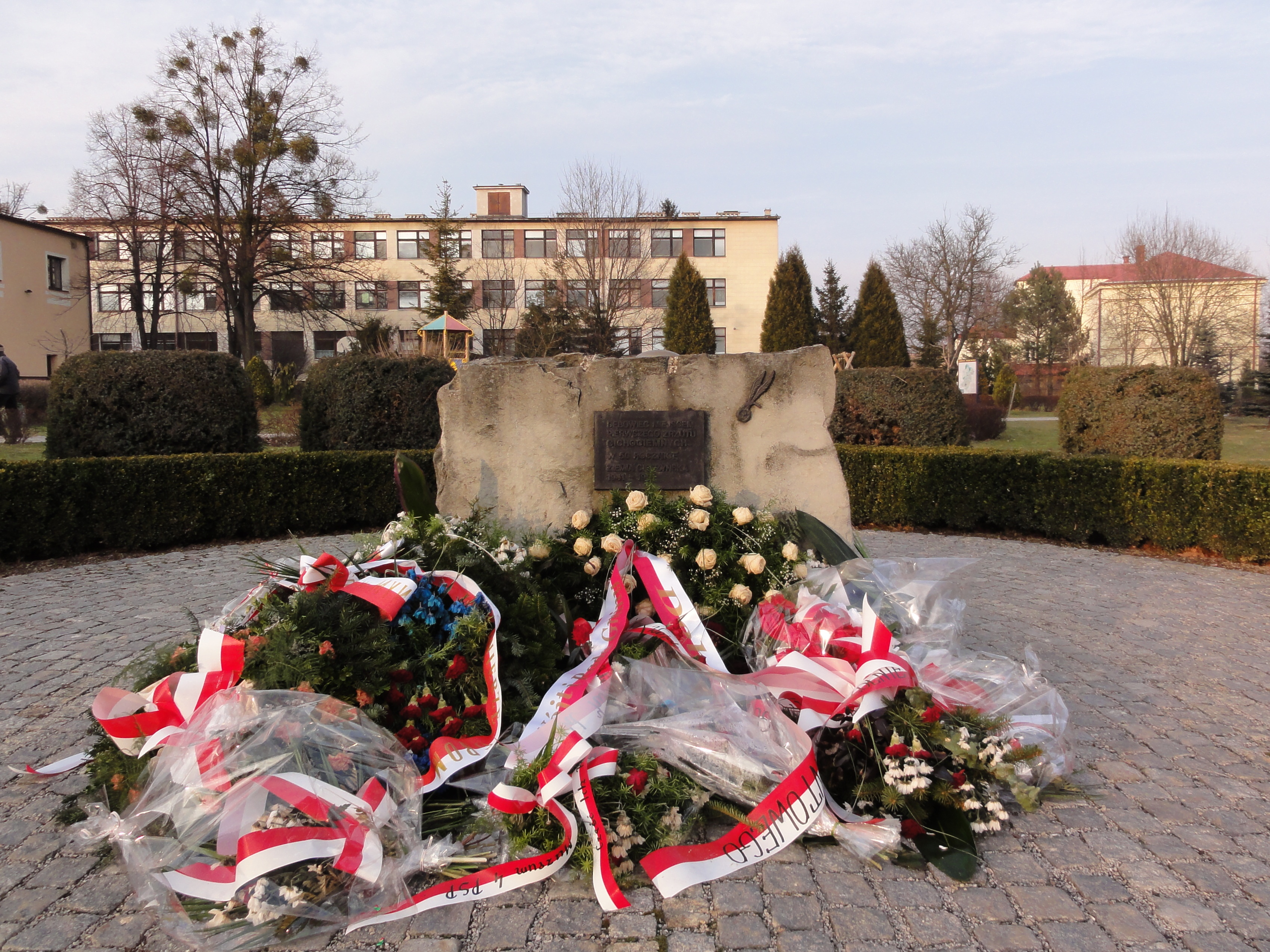
- Monument to the Silent Unseen in Dębowiec
- Active: 16 February 1941 – 27 December 1944
- Country: occupied Poland
- Allegiance: Polish government-in-exile
- Type: Special operations paratroops
- Role: Armed forces of Polish Underground State/Polish government-in-exile
- Engagements: World War II: Operation Tempest; Operation Ostra Brama; Lwów Uprising; Warsaw Uprising

Insignia
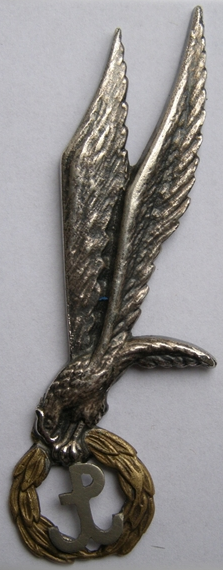
- Identification symbol

The Silent Unseen (Polish: Cichociemni, Polish pronunciation: [t͡ɕixɔˈt͡ɕɛmɲi]) were elite special-operations paratroopers of the Polish Armed Forces in the West, created in Great Britain during World War II to operate in occupied Poland (Cichociemni Spadochroniarze Armii Krajowej).

A total of 2,613 Polish Army soldiers volunteered for training by Polish and British SOE operatives. Only 606 people completed the training, and eventually 316 of them were secretly parachuted into occupied Poland. The first operation ("air bridge") took place on 15 February 1941. This operation was conducted by Captain Józef Zabielski, Major Stanisław Krzymowski and political courier Czesław Raczkowski. 91 Cichociemni operatives took part in the Warsaw Uprising of 1944. Further operations were discontinued after 27 December 1944, as by then most of Poland had been occupied by the Red Army.

Of the 316 Cichociemni, 103 perished during the war, either in combat with the Germans, in Gestapo executions, or in airplane crashes. A further nine were executed after the war by the communist regime of the Polish People's Republic, who considered the Cichociemni to be infiltrators under the influences of British ideology.

== Name ==
The origins of the name are obscure and may never be known with certainty. "Silent Unseen" probably related to how some soldiers seemingly disappeared from their line units overnight to volunteer for special operations service, and it also describes those "who appear silently where they are least expected, play havoc with the enemy and disappear whence they came, unnoticed, unseen."

The Silent Unseen were trained initially in Scotland in preparation for missions for the Polish underground in occupied Poland, such as building-clearance and bridge-demolition. In 1944, training was also carried out in Brindisi, Italy, which had fallen to the Allies.

Initially, the name was informal and was used mainly by soldiers who volunteered to parachute into Poland. However, from September 1941 the name became official and was used in all documents. It was applied to the secret Polish Headquarters training unit created to provide agents with necessary knowledge, money and equipment and to agents who were transported to Poland and other German-occupied countries.

== History ==
On 30 December 1939 Captain Jan Górski, a Polish Army officer who had escaped to France after the invasion of Poland, drew up a report for the Polish Chief of Staff. Górski proposed creating a secret unit to maintain contact with the underground ZWZ, using a group of well-trained envoys. After his report was ignored, Górski resubmitted it several times. Finally the commander of the Polish Air Force, General Zając, replied that, while creation of such a unit would be a good move, the Polish Air Force had no means of transport and no training facilities for such a unit.

Górski and his colleague Maciej Kalenkiewicz continued studying the possibility of paratroops and special forces. After the capitulation of France, they managed to reach the United Kingdom. They studied documents on German paratroops and drafted a plan to create in exile a Polish airborne force to be used in covert support operations. The force was to be employed solely in aid of a future uprising in occupied Poland. Their plan was never adopted, but on 20 September 1940 the Polish commander-in-chief, General Władysław Sikorski, ordered the creation of Section III of the Commander-in-Chief's Staff (Oddział III Sztabu Naczelnego Wodza). Section III's purpose was contingency planning for covert operations in Poland, air delivery of arms and supplies, and training of paratroops.

=== Training ===
Soon after, the General Staff's Section III began recruiting volunteers. Those selected left their erstwhile units in secret, silently and at night – hence, the perhaps at first facetious name, Cichociemni ("Silent Unseen"). Of 2,413 candidates, only 605 managed to complete the training and pass all the tests; of those, 579 qualified for airlift. The operational finishing school was conducted at Audley End House in Essex (STS 43). Polish command and coordination at Audley End were directed by Lieutenant Colonel Józef Hartman (known by recruits as "Tata", or "Dad"), who served as Polish liaison officer to SOE.

The volunteers included 1 general, 112 staff officers, 894 officers, 592 non-commissioned officers (NCOs), 771 privates, 15 women, and 28 civilian emissaries of the Polish Government in Exile. The training established by the General Staff's Section VI (Oddział VI Sztabu Naczelnego Wodza) and the British Special Operations Executive (SOE) comprised five courses:

- workout course (kurs zaprawowy)
- psychological and technical investigations course (kurs badań psychotechnicznych)
- parachuting course (kurs spadochronowy)
- covert-operations course (kurs walki konspiracyjnej)
- briefing course (kurs odprawowy)

During the first phase of training, all the volunteers were taught to use every kind of weapon (British, Polish, German, Russian and Italian weapons) and mines. In additional courses, the soldiers were trained in basic covert operations, topography, cryptography, and sharpshooting. They were also taught details of life in occupied Poland, from German-imposed laws to current fashions in occupied Warsaw. The fourth course included all kinds of covert operations, jujitsu, and shooting at invisible targets. The briefing course included learning a new, false identity. All soldiers who passed the training were sworn in as members of the Home Army.

=== Air bridges ===
Cichociemni after delivery to Home Army Radom-Kielce inspectorate, 22 September 1944

The first air-bridge operation took place on 15 February 1941. The Allied air commands carried out 483 air-bridge operations all together, losing 68 planes to crashes and enemy fire. Apart from the Silent Unseen themselves, some 630 tons of war materiel were delivered in special containers. In addition, agents delivered the following sums of money to the Home Army:

- 40,869,800 forged zlotys;
- US$26,299,375 in banknotes and gold;
- £1,755 in gold;
- RM 3,578,000.

Through 27 December 1944, 316 soldiers and 28 emissaries successfully parachuted into Poland. Additionally, 17 agents were dropped into Albania, France, Greece, Italy and Yugoslavia. An unknown number of Poles (including the best known, Krystyna Skarbek) were also parachuted into France by the British Special Operations Executive to start an underground movement among the half-million-strong Polish minority.

Though the Silent Unseen were organized in collaboration with SOE, it was largely independent. The Polish section of SOE was the only one which freely chose its own men and operated its own radio communications with an occupied country. Additionally, the identities of the Polish agents were known only to the Polish General Staff. Those transported to Poland included soldiers of all grades. The oldest was 54 years old, the youngest was 20. As a rule, all volunteers were promoted one rank at the moment of their jump.

Silent Unseen of a Home Army Kedyw unit, Radom-Kielce Home Army area, 1944

=== The fight ===
In Poland the Silent Unseen were assigned mostly to special units of the ZWZ and Home Army. Most of them joined Wachlarz, Związek Odwetu and KeDyw. Many became important staff officers of the Polish Secret Army and took part in Operation Tempest and uprisings in Wilno, Lwów and Warsaw.

The Silent Unseen assumed various duties in German-occupied Europe. Some 37 worked in intelligence, 50 were radio operators and emissaries, 24 were staff officers, 22 were airmen and airdrop coordinators, 11 were instructors of armored forces and instructors in anti-tank warfare at secret military schools, 3 were trained in forging documents, 169 were trained in covert operations and partisan warfare, and 28 were emissaries of the Polish government.

== Famous Silent Unseen ==
The most notable Silent Unseen included:

Rank	Name and pseudonym	Dropped	Note
Captain	Józef Zabielski - Żbik	15 February 1941	Dropped into Poland in the first Cichociemni operation, the night of 15–16 February 1941, with Stanisław Krzymowski and Czesław Raczkowski.
Colonel	Kazimierz Iranek-Osmecki - Antoni	14 March 1943	Commander of Home Army General Staff Section II (intelligence and counterintelligence); discovered the German V-1 and V-2 testing facility at Peenemünde; fought in the Warsaw Uprising.
General	Leopold Okulicki - Niedźwiadek	14 March 1943	Last commander of the Home Army; commander of the Nie organization; arrested by the NKVD and sentenced to 10 years' imprisonment in the staged Trial of the Sixteen, he was murdered on 24 December 1946 in Moscow's Butyrka prison.
Second Lieutenant, later Lieutenant (now Brigadier-General rtd., an honorary rank)	Stefan Bałuk - Starba; Kubuś	10 April 1944	Specialist in document-forging and microphotography, an operative of the "Agaton" legalization section, participant in Home Army intelligence operations. During the Warsaw Uprising, he was deputy commander of "Agaton" Platoon, and finally commander of "Communications Unit 59", a detachment protecting the Home Army General Staff.
Captain	Tadeusz Klimowski - Klon	7 January 1942	Chief of Staff of the Polish 27th Home Army Infantry Division
Second Lieutenant	Tadeusz Chciuk-Celt - Sulima	28 December 1941 and 4 April 1944	Operation Jacket and Operation Salamander—the only Silent Unseen to go on two parachute missions and return to base
Captain	Adam Borys - Pług	2 October 1942	organizer of the Agat group fighting against the Gestapo. The unit's best-known operation was the assassination of Franz Kutschera, SS and Reich Police Chief in Warsaw, in an operation known as Operation Kutschera
Captain	Władysław Kochański - Wujek / Bomba	2 September 1942	organizer of the Huta Stepańska and 700 strong Huta Stara (Bomba's Unit) self-defences. Kidnapped by Soviet Partisans in December 1943 and imprisoned in the Soviet gulags. Released in 1956 and returned to Poland, worked and studied at the Higher School of Economics, graduating in 1963 with a master's degree. Awarded the Silver Cross of Military Virtue.
Warrant Officer	Adolf Pilch - Góra, Dolina	17 February 1943	organizer of a 1000-strong cavalry partisan unit in the Nowogródek area, broke through to the Kampinos forest near Warsaw and liberated it with his men, fighting 235 battles between 3 June 1943 and 17 January 1945.
Lieutenant Colonel	Maciej Kalenkiewicz - Kotwicz	28 December 1941	organizer of the Cichociemni and the main planner of the Operation Ostra Brama, KIA in the Battle of Surkonty against NKVD forces on 21 August 1944.
Lieutenant	Józef Czuma - Skryty	18 February 1943	organizer of a partisan unit of his name in the Warsaw area, arrested by the Gestapo on 12 July 1944, probably tortured to death in Pawiak prison.
Lieutenant, later Captain	Stanisław Jankowski - Agaton	3 March 1942	forgery specialist, help set up the Home Army's document forgery department, codenamed 'Agaton section'; commander of 'Agaton Platoon' during the Warsaw Uprising; later he became an aide-de-camp to the Home Army's C-in-C, Tadeusz Bór-Komorowski; he survived the war to become a notable architect
Colonel	Józef Spychalski - Grudzień, Luty	31 March 1942	commander of the Kraków AK Area, arrested by Gestapo on 24 March 1944.
Colonel	Roman Rudkowski	26 January 1943	commander of the 3rd Detachment of the Home Army General Staff (air forces and aerial deliveries).
Major	Bolesław Kontrym	2 September 1942	organizer of the secret police force, took part in the Warsaw Uprising. After the war, he was arrested by Poland's Security Service and executed in January 1953.
Major	Hieronim Dekutowski "Zapora" "Odra", "Reżu", "Stary", "Henryk Zagon"	16–17 September 1943	Dropped on the night of 16–17 September 1943, along with Bronisław Rachwał "Glin" and Kazimierz Smolaker "Nurek", as part of Operation “Neon 1”. Initially he was a staff officer in a Home Army unit commanded by Tadeusz Kuncewicz "Podkowa". Eventually, he became commanding officer of the 4th company of the 9th Pułk Piechoty Legionów AK of the Local Inspectorate of Home Army "Zamość". In addition to sabotage and his regular fighting against German anti-partisan units, he organized hideouts for Jewish refugees in his partisan camps. After the war, he joined Wolność i Niezawisłość. He was arrested by the Security Service, tortured, and tried in secret on 3 November 1948. He was sentenced to death and executed on 7 March 1949. His burial place is unknown.
Major (posthumously)	Wacław Kopisto "Kra"	2 September 1942	Dropped into Poland on 2 September 1942. Commander of Kedyw in the Łuck Inspectorate, organized Polish self-defence in Wołyń. He was captured by the Soviets in 1944 and sentenced to death, commuted to 10 years in Siberia. He returned to Poland in 1955.
Major	Jan Piwnik "Ponury"	7 November 1941	Dropped into Poland on 7 November 1941. He was commanding officer of KeDyw in the Radom-Kielce Home Army district. He organized a large Home Army unit, Zgrupowania Partyzanckie Armii Krajowej "Ponury". He was killed in action near the village of Jewlaszcze on 16 June 1944.
Brigadier-General rtd. (an honorary rank)	Elżbieta Zawacka - "Zelma", "Zo"	10 September 1943	the only female Silent Unseen agent to be dropped into occupied Poland; she served as a courier between Home Army Headquarters and the Polish Government in Exile. After the war, she was arrested and tortured by the Security Service and spent a long period in prison. She later pursued academic research, earning a doctorate from Gdańsk University.
Lieutenant Colonel	Stanisław Dmowski - "Podlasiak"	27 December 1944	Dropped into Poland to drop point Wilga during Operation Staszek 2, he subsequently fought in Battalion "Andrzej" operating in Silesia, disrupting German communications and harassing their retreating forces. After the arrival of Russian forces, he was at the disposal of Area Commander Kraków, where he was Chief of Action 2 and Military Intelligence, Home Army Headquarters. Arrested and interrogated by the Security Service, he was released and escaped from Poland in 1946.

== Losses ==
Of 344 men transported to Poland, 113 were killed in action:

- 84 in fighting against the Germans, or arrested and tortured to death by the Gestapo;
- 10 committed suicide in German prisons or concentration camps;
- 10 were executed by the Communists during or after the war;
- 9 were shot down with their planes before reaching their targets.

Of 91 Silent Unseen who took part in the Warsaw Uprising, 18 were killed in action.

== Postwar ==
The first book on the Silent Unseen was published in England in 1954. The Polish edition, Drogi cichociemnych: opowiadania zebrane i opracowane przez koło spadochroniarzy Armii Krajowej, was published by Veritas; and an English edition, The Unseen and Silent: Adventures from the Underground Movement, Narrated by Paratroops of the Polish Home Army, was published by Sheed and Ward.

The Polish edition was republished in England several times, last in 1973. A miniature version of Drogi cichociemnych was published in two volumes in communist Poland in 1985 by Kurs.

General Stefan Bałuk's memoir, Byłem Cichociemnym (I was a Cichociemny), was published in 2008. He was 94 years old when it first appeared in bookstores. In 2009 it was translated into English as Silent and Unseen: I was a WW II Special Ops Commando.

On 4 August 1995, the Polish special-forces unit GROM adopted the name and traditions of the Cichociemni.

Polish TV has produced a series, Czas honoru (Time of Honour), about the Silent Unseen.

An urban park commemorating the paratroopers, known as the Silent Unseen Park, was established in 2016 in Warsaw.

== See also ==
- Home Army
- Kedyw
- Polish government-in-exile
- Stanisław Sosabowski
- Warsaw Rising Museum
- Western betrayal
- GROM Military Unit

== Bibliography ==
- Ian Valentine, Station 43: Audley End House and SOE's Polish Section, The History Press, 2006, p. 224, ISBN 0-7509-4255-X.
- Hubert Królikowski, Tobie Ojczyzno – Cichociemni: Wojskowa Formacja Specjalna GROM im. Cichociemnych Spadochroniarzy Armii Krajowej, 1990-2000, Gdańsk, 2001.
- P. Bystrzycki, Znak cichociemnych, Warsaw, 1985.
- Drogi cichociemnych, Warsaw, 1993.
- Kazimierz Iranek-Osmecki, The Unseen and Silent: Adventures from the Underground Movement, Narrated by Paratroops of the Polish Home Army, Sheed and Ward, 1954.
- Jędrzej Tucholski, Cichociemni, Warsaw, Instytut Wydawniczy PAX, 1984, ISBN 83-211-0537-8..
- Jan Szatsznajder, Cichociemni: Z Polski do Polski (The Silent Unseen: From Poland to Poland), Wrocław, 1985.
- C. Chlebowski, Cztery z tysiąca (Four of a Thousand), Warsaw, KAW, 1981.
- G. Korczyński - Polskie oddziały specjalne w II wojnie światowej, Warsaw, Dom Wydawniczy Bellona, 2006, ISBN 83-11-10280-5.
- Elżbieta Zawacka, Katarzyna Minczykowska, Wydawnictwo Fundacji Archiwum Pomorskie Armii Krajowej, Toruń, 2007.
