= Janowa Dolina massacre =

Massacre during WW2

Coordinates: 50°55′35″N 26°14′23″E

Janowa Dolina in the 1930s

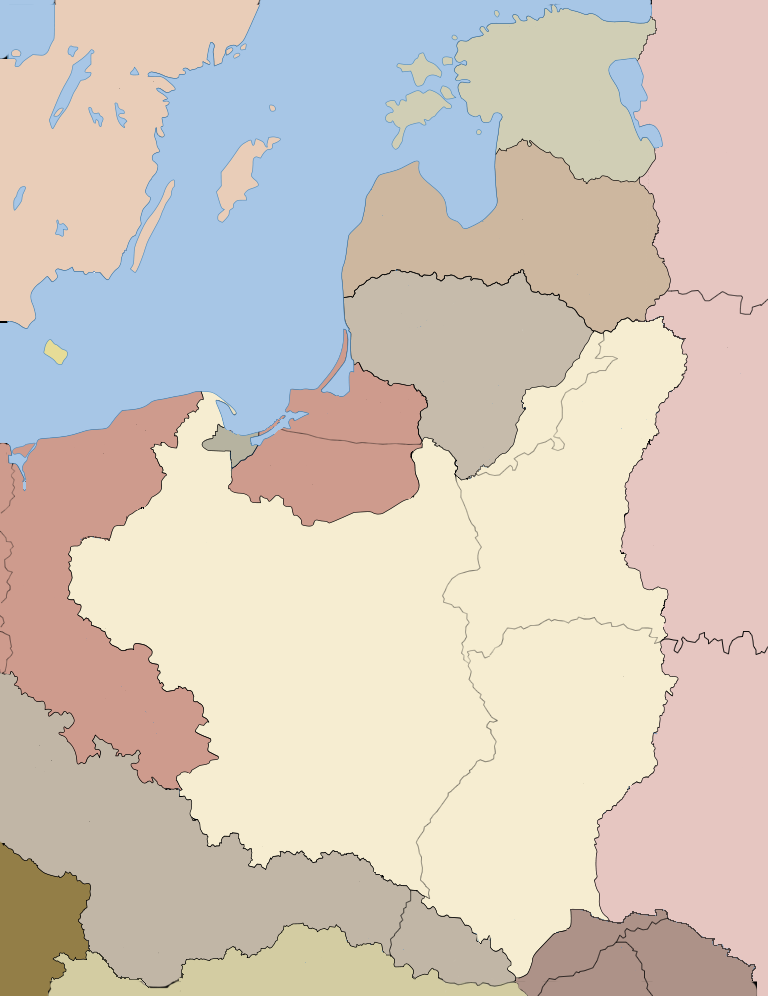
Location of Janowa Dolina massacre
(map of Poland before the 1939 invasion)

The Janowa Dolina massacre took place on 23 April 1943 in the village of Janowa Dolina, (now Bazaltove, Ukraine) during the occupation of Poland in World War II. Before the Nazi invasion of the Polish Second Republic, Janowa Dolina was a model settlement built in the Kostopol County of the Wołyń Voivodeship by workers of the Polish State Basalt Quarry. The town was inhabited by 2,500 people. Its name, which translates as the "Jan's Valley" in Polish, came from the Polish king Jan Kazimierz, who reportedly hunted in the Volhynian forests, and after hunting — rested on the shore of the Horyń (Horyn) River. The town was destroyed during World War II by the Ukrainian Insurgent Army who murdered most of its Polish population including women and children.

== First years ==
The settlement was built in the late 1920s and early 1930s following Poland's return to independence after a century of imperial Partitions. The area was ceded to Poland at the Peace of Riga, with large percentage of the ethnic Ukrainian population. The town was created next to the newly built major construction aggregate quarry. Production of basalt in the quarry started in 1929, when the 18 km rail connection between Janowa Dolina and Kostopol was completed (Kostopol is located on the main rail route Wilno–Łuniniec–Lwów). As the quarry employed in late 1930s some 3,000 workers (97% of them were Polish), homes were built for them and their families in a suburban setting.

The quarry with a company town was the brainchild of Leonard Szutkowski, chief engineer who kept his post until 1940, and his deputies, engineer J. Niwinski and engineer Urbanowicz. Most workers lived in the freshly built houses; some commuted from nearby villages.

== The settlement ==
Janowa Dolina was a very modern settlement; houses had access to electricity and plumbing and its layout was based on a specially designed grid plan. Houses were placed in the beautiful pine forest. Streets bore no names; they were marked by letters — A, B, C, D... G (Glowna — main), until the last one, Z, placed closest to the Horyn River. Along them there were houses, each designed for 4 families. As inhabitants of Janowa Dolina later remembered, the settlement was full of flowers, plants and trees and neighbors competed with each other, trying to have the most beautiful flower garden. The settlement was separated from the nearby quarry by a strip of dense forest.

In the central part of the settlement there was a huge, U-shaped building, called BLOK. Inside there were several institutions — a movie theater, hotel, cafeteria, stores. Next to the building there was a sports field, with a soccer stadium. The quarry sponsored its own sports club called Strzelec Janowa Dolina, which had several departments — soccer, boxing, wrestling, swimming. A Roman Catholic church was planned, but it had never been built. Instead, the faithful used a large barn. Also, in Janowa Dolina there was a Polish police station, school, kindergarten and a health center.

As both the quarry and the settlement belonged to the Polish State, private businesses were not allowed. In Janowa Dolina all trade was controlled by the national “Społem” company, inhabitants were able to purchase all desired products but alcohol, which was not sold in the settlement.

== World War II ==
In September 1939, Soviet troops, following the Molotov–Ribbentrop Pact, attacked the eastern part of Poland, which was not guarded by the Polish Army, as at the same time the Poles were fighting the Germans in the West. Eastern Poland (Kresy) was quickly occupied, together with Janowa Dolina, which, like the entire Volhynian Voivodeship, became part of the Ukrainian Soviet Socialist Republic. Together with Soviet rule came mass deportations to Siberia and other areas of the country; between September 1939 and June 1941 Janowa Dolina lost hundreds of inhabitants.

=== Destruction of the settlement ===
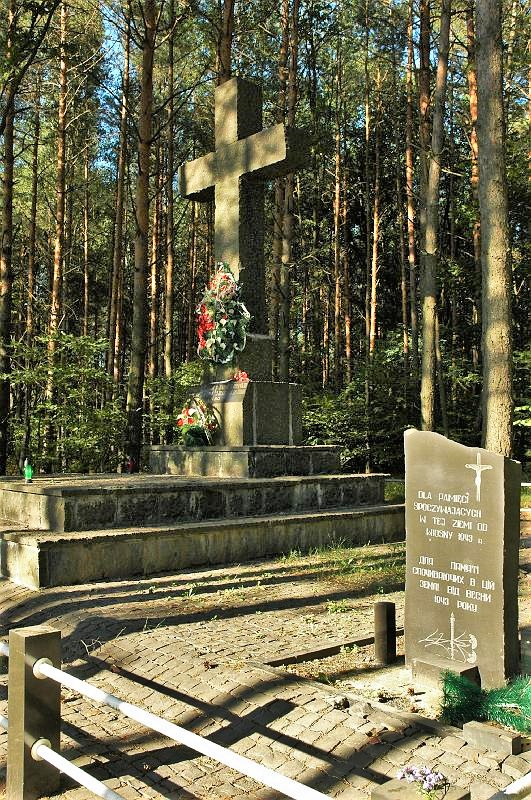
Monument in memory of Polish citizens of Janowa Dolina Wolyn murdered by Ukrainian Insurgent Army (UPA) on 22–23 April 1943

In June 1941, Nazi Germany attacked the Soviet Union. Janowa Dolina was added to the Reichskommissariat Ukraine. As Volhynia was the area of activity for various Ukrainian nationalist groups whose aim was to cleanse the land of Poles and Jews, the settlement's fate was inevitable. On the night of 22–23 April 1943 (Good Friday), the Ukrainians from the Ukrainian Insurgent Army, together with local peasants, attacked Janowa Dolina. Some 600 people, including children and the elderly, were brutally murdered (see massacres of Poles in Volhynia). Most homes were burned to the ground and the settlement deserted.

The perpetrators, commanded by Ivan Lytwynchuk (a.k.a. Dubowy) exercised rare cruelty. Poles, unprepared and caught by surprise, were hacked to death with axes, burned alive, and impaled (including children). The murderers did not spare anyone, regardless of age and sex. A nearby German garrison, numbering around 100 soldiers, did not act and remained in its barracks. After first wave of murders, the Ukrainian nationalists started searching the hospital. They carried its Ukrainian patients away from the building, while Polish patients were burned alive. Dr Aleksander Bakinowski, together with his assistant Jan Borysowicz, were hacked to death on the square in front of the hospital. In several cases, Ukrainians were murdered for trying to hide their Polish neighbours. Petro Mirchuk, a Ukrainian historian, counted several hundred massacred Poles, with only eight UPA members killed.

== Current events ==
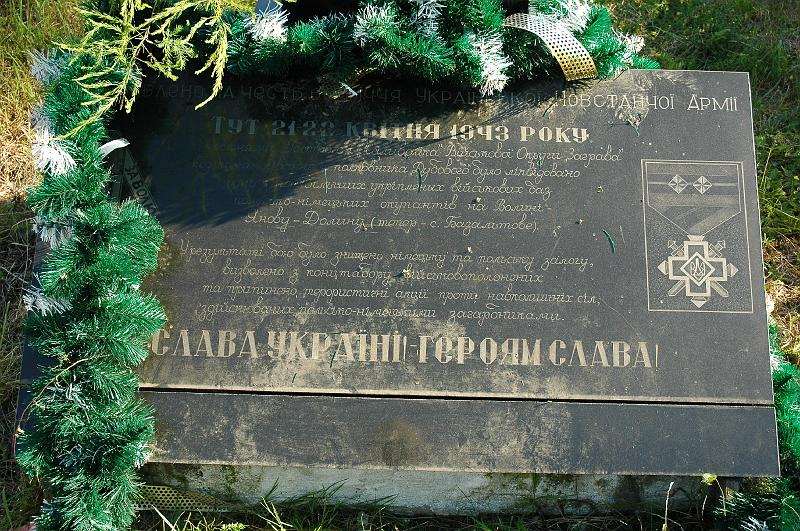
Monument in memory of UPA.

The present-day name of the settlement is Bazal'tove. In the place where buildings once stood, there is a monument, founded by Polish survivors. Its opening (18 April 1998) was marred by a demonstration of Ukrainian nationalists, and afterwards, the original inscription was changed. The date "23 April 1943" was removed and now the inscription says only "In memory of Poles from Janowa Dolina", without giving further information of their fate. Nowadays in the village monument in memory of infamous action of Ukrainian Insurgent Army (UPA) is situated. The inscription in Ukrainian says that on 21–22 April 1943 "the base of Polish–German occupiers of Volhyn" was liquidated here.
