= Władysław Kochański =

Polish military commander

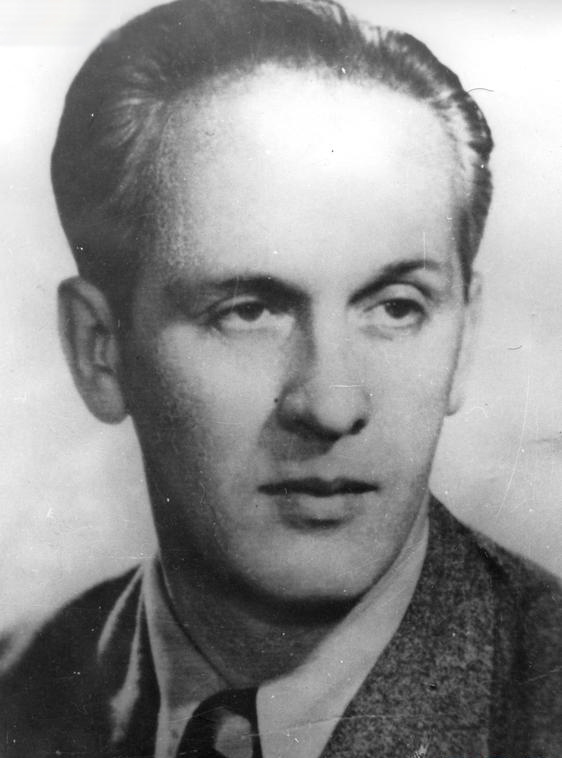
Władysław Kochański

Władysław Kochański (noms de guerre "Bomba" and "Wujek"; 7 November 1918 – 12 December 1980) was an infantry captain in the Polish Army during World War II. He was then part of the Polish resistance army Armia Krajowa after Germany occupied Poland, leading the Cichociemni special forces paratrooper resistance unit, and was one of the leading organizers of the Polish defense of Volhynia.

== Early life ==
Kochański was born on 7 November 1918 in Stanisławów.

== Invasion of Poland and Polish Armed Forces in the West ==
During the German Invasion of Poland in 1939 Kochański served in the 48 Kresowe Infantry Rifle Regiment as commander of air defenses at Stryj. After the fall of Poland he escaped to Hungary, where he was held at the Magyrovar camp. After escaping from the camp, he travelled to France and attended a training camp at Coetquidan, earning the post of machine gun platoon leader under the school's ensign. Kochański took an active part in the Battle for France in a mixed battalion attached to the 4th Infantry Division (Poland). At the end of June 1940 he evacuated to Great Britain on the Royal Navy destroyer Viscount and was assigned to the 2nd Grenadier Battalion "Kratkowane Lwiątka" (Rampant Lion) of the 1st Rifle Brigade, where he commanded a machine gun platoon.

== Service in the Polish Underground Army 1942–1943 ==
From October 1941 to 6 June 1942 Kochański served in the 1st (Polish) Independent Parachute Brigade. He then undertook a specialist training course in diversion (sabotage) tactics with the Special Operations Executive at Audley End, in order to join the ranks of the Cichociemni(Silent and Dark) paratroopers, who engaged in sabotage and special operations behind enemy lines. He completed the training course on 18 August 1942 and was parachuted into occupied Poland on the night of 1–2 September 1942 during Operation Chickenpox. Kochański landed at the receiving outpost Rogi, 16 km northeast of Grojca. After a period of acclimatization in Warsaw, he was assigned under the name "Bomba" to the second sector of the Wachlarz network in Volhynia, where he commanded the Kowel-Sarny diversion centre moving towards Kiev. When Wachlarz was winding down, Kochański was directed to help restructure the Volhynia-region Armia Krajowa (resistance army known as AK).

On 8 July 1943 the AK inspector of Równe, Captain Klimowski "Ostaja" entrusted Kochański with rebuilding the underground network in Kostopolski County, which had broken up following arrests by the Germans. Kochański started in the village of Wyrka, near Huta Stepańska, to carry out this mission, but faced the intensification of anti-Polish operations by Ukrainian nationalists and the Ukrainian Insurgent Army (UPA).

When the Volhynian massacres started, Kochański took command of the self-defense center at Huta Stepańska where over 5,000 Poles were taking shelter. On 7 July 1943 the UPA began to concentrate its forces in the region, and on 16 July the Banderists prepared to attack, burning down 15 towns adjacent to Huta Stepańska. On the same day, UPA forces attacked the center itself and the fighting turned to hand-to-hand combat. After 32 hours of combat, Kochański decided to break through the ring of stronger Ukrainian forces along with the people. The plan partly succeeded. The civilians were evacuated to the area of Wydmer below Włodzimierz, where they dispersed to Kowel, Sarny and Przebraże. 40 people fell defending Huta Stepańska and Kochański himself was wounded in the arm. More than 600 civilians died in attacks on nearby villages or during the evacuation of Huta Stepańska, when panic led some to break away before the group effort.

During the second half of July 1943, Kochański organized a unit of almost 500 men to operate in the Stara Huta district in the Kostopol region, where the Polish self-defense base was located. The core of the unit was made up of former defenders of Huta Stepańska. For five months, they fought a series of skirmishes with UPA units in the Kostopol district, saving thousands of Poles. Kochański also continued fighting the Germans, sometimes with the cooperation of Soviet units such as the famous Kowpak unit. Kochański's biggest victory took place 19 November 1943 at Moczulanka, where with the cooperation of Soviet units assembled around Szytow and commanded by Captain Kotlarow, he was able to break up and partly disperse a group of 1200 UPA troops carrying out an assault on the self-defense center at Huta Stara. This was the last time the UPA were able to launch attacks on Huta Stara.

Kochański's unit became a major force, numbering nearly 700 well-armed soldiers. The unit made long marches to defend the Poles and demonstrate its strength. In the second half of December 1943 Kochański, recently promoted to captain, led the unit to Huta Stara, where was to be stationed over Christmas.

== Arrest and return from the Soviet Gulag ==
In December 1943 Kochański stopped with his unit in the town of Bronislawka. He learned that Soviet commander General Naumov wanted to meet him, and invited him to his headquarters in the nearby village of Zawolcze. Kochański went to the headquarters accompanied by Lieutenant Strzemia, Father Leon Spiewka and an escort of several non-commissioned officers. During the feast at Zawolcze the whole Polish group was disarmed and arrested. The Soviet unit moved out in a hurried march to the east. During a rest stop the soldiers of the escort were shot and Captain Kochański, Lieutenant Strzemia and Father Oboznik were taken to Kiev and later to Moscow.

The loss of the commander resulted in the partial break up of Kochański's unit. After his arrest and kidnapping, his unit was significantly reduced with many soldiers going to the self-defense center and others returning home to their families.

In Moscow, Bomba was tried and sentenced to 25 years imprisonment as a representative of a "foreign agency". After four years in prison in Moscow, he was sent to the copper mines in Kamchatka. Due to his age and poor health, he was returned to Poland in December 1956. He worked and studied at the Higher School of Economics, graduating in 1963 with a master's degree. He was awarded the Silver Cross of Military Virtue and died on 12 December 1980 at the age of 62 in Kraków.
