= Cross of the Home Army =

Polish military decoration

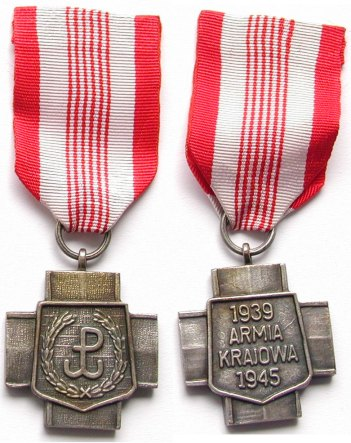
Armia Krajowa Cross

The Cross of the Home Army (Polish: Krzyż Armii Krajowej) is a Polish military decoration that was introduced by General Tadeusz Bór-Komorowski on 1 August 1966 to commemorate the efforts of the soldiers of the Polish Secret State between 1939 and 1945. The decoration was awarded to soldiers of the Home Army (Armia Krajowa) and of its predecessor organizations (Służba Zwycięstwu Polski, Związek Walki Zbrojnej).

The first recipient (posthumous) was General Stefan Grot–Rowecki.

The award was supported by the Polish government in exile in London and was not recognized by the People's Republic of Poland, which viewed members of the mostly anti-communist Armia Krajowa as enemies of the state. After the fall of communism, in 1992 it was recognized by the government of Poland and was awarded by the president of Poland until 8 May 1999.
