= Volhynia (film) =

Wołyń
- Directed by: Wojciech Smarzowski
- Screenplay by: Wojciech Smarzowski
- Produced by: Film itp. z o.o.
- Starring: Michalina Łabacz; Vasyl Vasylyk
- Edited by: Paweł Laskowski
- Music by: Mikołaj Trzaska
- Distributed by: Forum Film Poland
- Release dates: 23 September 2016 (Gdynia); 7 October 2016 (Poland)
- Running time: 150 minutes
- Country: Poland
- Box office: $6,960,645

Volhynia or Hatred (Polish: Wołyń) is a 2016 Polish war drama directed by Wojciech Smarzowski. The film is set in the 1939–1943 time frame and its central theme is Ukrainian anti-Polish hatred culminating in massacres of Poles in Wołyń. The screenplay was based on the collection of short stories titled Hate (Polish: Nienawiść) by Stanisław Srokowski.

The film was nominated for the Golden Lions Award at the 41st Gdynia Film Festival, where it received three awards: for the cinematography, best debut, and best makeup.

== Plot ==
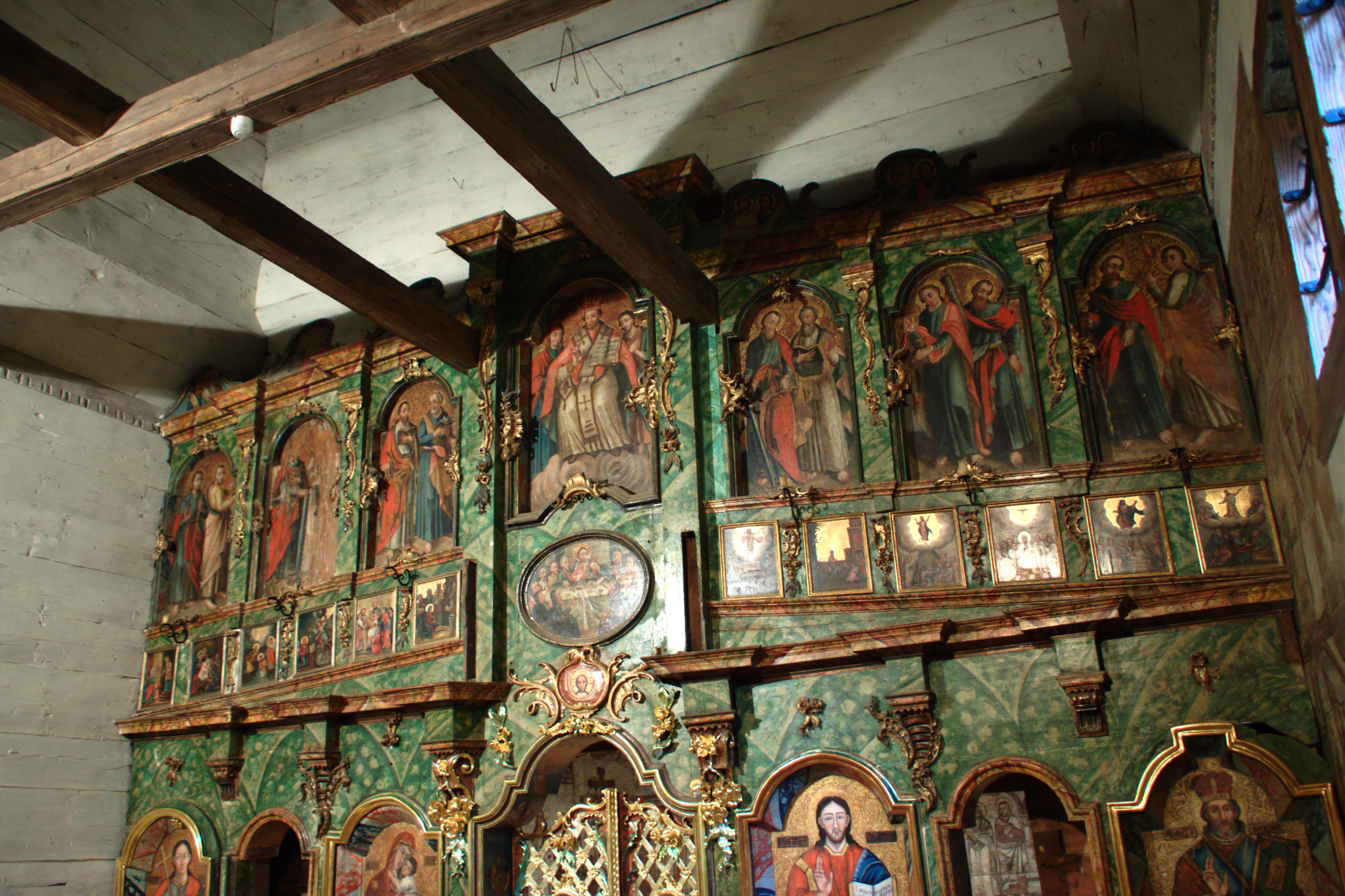
Cerkiew z Grąziowej, an Orthodox church where some of the film's scenes were recorded in 2014

The movie tells the story of a young Polish girl, Zosia Głowacka, from a village settled by Ukrainians, Poles and Jews in Volhynia. The story begins shortly before the outbreak of World War II in 1939 with the marriage of Zosia's sister to a Ukrainian. During the wedding, Zosia's father decides that she has to marry an older village administrator and a widower, Maciej Skiba, despite her being deeply in love with a young, local Ukrainian boy, Petro. The local Ukrainian population shows a lot of resentment towards Polish officials, as they favor the Polish minority in Volhynia. Because of that, some Ukrainians carry out terrorist attacks against Polish authorities and Ukrainian collaborators. These attacks are met with severe actions from the Polish government, including closing Orthodox churches and the humiliation of the Ukrainian population. Despite that, some parts of the Ukrainian and Polish populations try to reconcile with each other.

When the war begins, Maciej gets conscripted to the Polish Army to fight against the Germans in the September Campaign. When the campaign is lost, Maciej and other survivors try to return to their homes. On their way back, all members of the group, except Maciej, are captured by local Ukrainians, tortured and killed. Maciej manages to get to the village thanks to disguising himself as a Ukrainian. The village is in the eastern part of Poland, which gets occupied by the Soviet Union, and communist rule is established in the village. The local Ukrainian and Jewish populations co-operate with the Soviet authorities, replacing prewar Polish authorities as governors.

In the meantime, Zosia gets pregnant, most likely by Petro, but wants Maciej to believe that the child is his. As a part of a massive deportation of the Polish population carried out by the Soviets in 1939–1941, Zosia, Maciej and his children, are about to be sent to Siberia or Kazakhstan to do forced labour. Zosia and the children are rescued in the last moment, just as the train is about to depart. Petro bribes the guard with vodka. When they come back to Petro's home, Zosia gets contractions. While she is giving birth to her child, the now drunken guard arrives and kills Petro. Zosia then takes care of Maciej's home and children during his absence. The children are sent to a school organized by the Soviets.

The plot then switches to 1941, when the German Army is conquering Volhynia during Operation Barbarossa. The Germans begin to kill the local Jews and organize local police units from Ukrainian collaborators, who actively participate in the Holocaust. However, Zosia and other Ukrainians still try to help the Jews by hiding them in safe places.

Zosia tries to get by the best she can while she takes care of the children. However, one day, she defends herself against an attempted rape by a Ukrainian policeman, and the presence of the Jews hidden by her is revealed. The Jews, an old couple and a young unrelated boy, escape and find shelter for the winter in the home of a local Ukrainian, who agrees to help after the Jew promises him a large amount of golden rubles he buried in a forest. When the Jew's wife dies and winter comes, the Ukrainian demands a payment. When he sees that the Jew lied to him for shelter, he murders him in the forest. The young Jew is rescued by the Ukrainian's son, though later he is caught by the Germans and is murdered along with dozens of other Jews in a forest.

In the meantime, Maciej comes back home after he manages to escape deportation. The family tries to organize its life in the changed reality, as the Poles face increased hostility from their Ukrainian neighbours, resulting in an increase of murders of Poles committed by the latter. One day Maciej sets out to the local market despite Zosia's protests motivated by her fearing for his safety. She is proven right, as the other Polish neighbours arrive some days later with Maciej's head cut off.

In the summer of 1943, news about the killings committed by Ukrainians spreads among the Poles in the village. At the time, a young Polish man who is seriously injured arrives at Zosia's home. When he recovers, he settles there as it makes Zosia feel safer. He contacts the local Home Army unit, which, by orders of the Polish government in the United Kingdom, does not protect the Poles from Ukrainian attacks but prepares to fight the Germans in the future. When the young man is asked to be a guide for members of the Home Army on the way to a meeting with the Ukrainian Insurgent Army (UPA), Zosia desperately tries to discourage him from going. She failed to stop him.

In the meantime, the local Ukrainian population, the former Ukrainian policeman and his friends join the UPA in the forest. They gather and call to eradicate the lands from Poles. Soon, the first survivors of the pogroms arrive to the village and tell the story of Ukrainian neighbours killing Poles and everybody who protested against the killings. The local Ukrainian village administrator arrives at Zosia's home to ensure her that she and her children can stay at home, as they would not be harmed by their Ukrainian neighbours. Also, other Polish people are reassured about their safety. However, those are only deception tactics to allow Ukrainians to kill as many Poles as possible.

When two members of the Home Army arrive at the meeting, as agreed without weapons, they get surrounded by the UPA soldiers, captured, and then dismembered by horses. The men from the UPA then hunt for the rest of the Home Army group. They find only Zosia's friend, who has escaped and is hiding in a church that is full of Poles. During the ceremony, the Ukrainians enter the church, killing everyone in the way, but Zosia's friend. She runs to the church's tower and somehow survives the attack.

Meanwhile, there are two opposite sermons shown of Ukrainian Orthodox priests: the older one preaches about loving neighbours and all nations having a right to live in peace, while the younger one uses the Parable of the Tares to encourage parishioners in killing Poles to achieve pure Ukrainian lands at last.

The killings in the village begin at night. Zosia escapes with her child, but as she runs away, she sees Poles being tortured, including pregnant women being stabbed in womb, people getting disemboweled and getting their eyes gouged out. Zosia's stepson is murdered during this massacre. Her stepdaughter, however, is rescued by a Ukrainian peasant. On their way to escape from certain death, Zosia and her child arrive to Petro's previous house, where they get rescued by Petro's mother.

As Zosia runs away with her child from place to place, she encounters the corpses of mutilated Polish infants, women and elderly in every village. In one place, she runs into a unit of the German Army, which saves her from certain death, just moments before Ukrainians are about to kill her and her child. The Germans are astonished at first as to why she walks alongside them, but when they find more and more stacks of murdered Poles on their way, they feel sorry for her and escort her to the place where her sister, Helena, lives. She is welcomed there, as Vasyl, Helena's Ukrainian husband, is friendly to Poles. Zosia hides in their shed with her son. As most of the village's population is already involved in killings, Vasyl's brother tries to convince him to join the nationalists and to kill his Polish wife so that he can save himself and the children. As they wrangle, Vasyl kills his own brother with an axe.

The next night, the whole family is attacked by Poles who seek revenge on Ukrainians. They condemn Helena for living with a Ukrainian. They slaughter her newborn in front of her eyes, kill Vasyl and behead her. Zosia observes everything from the shed. Terrified, she escapes again and is now afraid of both Ukrainians and Poles. She hides in the woods with her son. Subsequent scenes show the UPA rushing through the forest, exultantly celebrating while leading a cart occupied by the Poles who killed Helena's family and other Ukrainians, but now disfigured, mauled and visibly tortured as punishment for the retaliatory attacks. A young, blond man with obscured features places Zosia's son on a horse-drawn cart, before approaching Zosia's resting place in the forest. The film then alternates between shots of an unconscious Zosia on a cart, Zosia and her son walking through a German checkpoint at a bridge, before finally settling on an unconscious Zosia lying on the cart, her son sitting at the front of the wagon with the young man, who looks exactly like Petro, making their way through the wide green fields of Volhynia.

== Cast ==
- Michalina Łabacz as Zosia Głowacka
- Arkadiusz Jakubik as Maciej Skiba
- Vasyl Vasylyk as Petro
- Izabela Kuna as Głowacka, Zosia's mother
- Adrian Zaremba as Antek Wilk
- Lech Dyblik as Hawryluk
- Jacek Braciak as Głowacki, Zosia's father
- Tomasz Sapryk as Izaak Menzl
- Jarosław Gruda as Lisowski
- Wojciech Zieliński as "Chmura"
- Sebastian Stegmann as German
- Andrzej Popiel as Romek Głowacki, Zosia's brother
- Oleksandr Chesherov as Mykola Melenchuk
- Roman Skorovskyi as Stepan Czuma
- Iryna Skladan as Olga Hypyna, Petro's mother
- Aleksandr Zbarazhskiy as Vasyl Huk
- Heorhiy Povokotskyi as the miller
- Oles Fedorchenko as Ivan Huk
- Ludmila Goncharova as Petro's sister
- Serhiy Bakhyk as Andriy Kurchuk
- Volodymyr Protsyuk as Orlyk Libera

== Production ==
As the budget of the film was insufficient, the director appealed to the public for financial support in order to gather required funds to finish the film. Afterwards, the financial support was received from, for example, Telewizja Polska.

Filming took place in: Lublin, Kolbuszowa, Kazimierz Dolny, Rawa Mazowiecka, Sanok and Skierniewice, from 19 September 2014 to 21 August 2015.

== Release ==
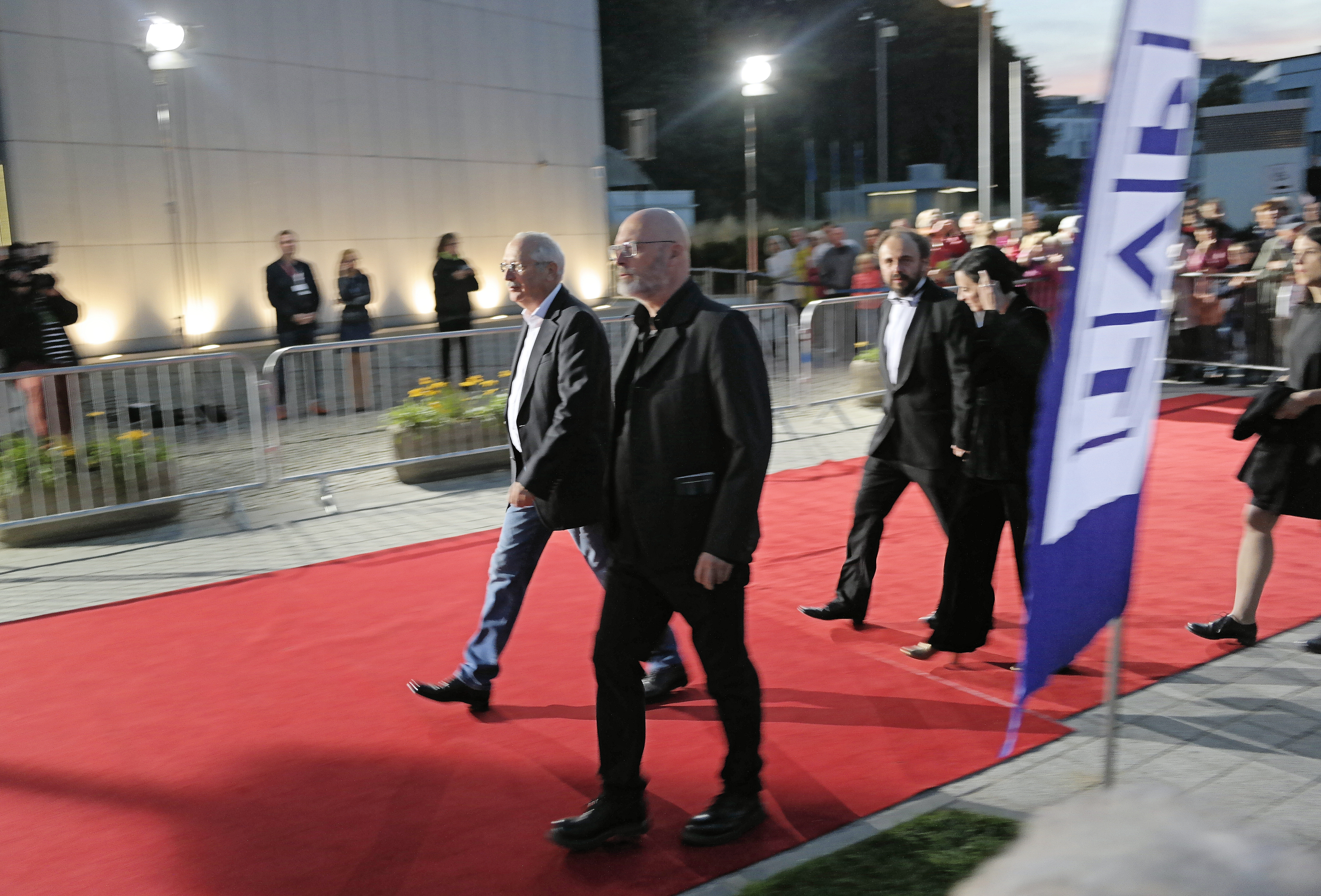
Wojciech Smarzowski, the director of the film, at the Gdynia Film Festival, 2016

Volhynia had its world premiere at the 41st Gdynia Film Festival on 23 September 2016. It was theatrically released in Poland by Forum Film Poland on 7 October 2016.

== Awards and nominations ==
- 2016: Nomination for the Golden Lions Polish Film Award at the 41st Gdynia Film Festival.
- 2016: Best Cinematography Award to Piotr Sobociński at the 41st Gdynia Film Festival
- 2016: Best Debut Award to Michalina Łabacz at the 41st Gdynia Film Festival
- 2016: Best Makeup Award to Ewa Drobiec at the 41st Gdynia Film Festival

== Reception ==
=== In Poland ===
In Tadeusz Sobolewski's opinion, Volhynia is a movie without precedents in Polish cinema after 1989. Piotr Zychowicz and Pawel Lisicki praised the movie, underlying its authenticity and historical accuracy. Grażyna Torbicka and Tomasz Raczek both expressed surprise the film had not received the main award at the 2016 Gdynia Film Festival in Poland. Jakub Majmurek wrote that Volhynia has met his high expectations and is one of the best movie describing the history of the "bleeding lands". The author also believes that the director of the movie, Smarzowski, presented the relations between Poles and Ukrainians honestly, and the notion of the movie is a warning against any form of radicalism. Ewa Siemaszko, who cooperates with the Institute of National Remembrance to uncover the historical facts of the massacres of Poles in Volhynia and Eastern Galicia, thinks that the movie shows the events accurately. She quoted opinions of witnesses of the genocide, who said the movie is like a documentary on the events in Volhynia. Ewa Siemaszko additionally remarked that the massacres of Poles in Volhynia was genocide with exceptional cruelty – "genocidium atrox". It was a fierce, cruel and terrible genocide.

=== In Germany ===
According to Gerhard Gnauck, Volhynia was the film that for which Polish society had long waited. On the occasion of the premiere, Gnauck recalled the history of the region and the Polish-Ukrainian relations. The author cited expectations of some political experts that the movie may chill the relations, arouse negative emotions in Ukraine and be exploited by the Russians to unleash anti-Ukrainian propaganda. Gnauck has underlined the episode of Zosia and her child seeking shelter around a unit of the German Army. In Gnauck's opinion, the film is very good and balances the rights of both sides.

=== In Ukraine ===
Following the recommendation of the Ukrainian ambassador to Poland, Andrii Deshchytsia, showing the film has been banned in Ukraine. Reportedly, the censorship was rationalized by the Ukrainian authorities, who alleged that the film "could cause unrest on the streets of Kyiv". The head of the Ukrainian Association in Poland, Piotr Tyma, supported the ban by asserting that the film undermined Polish-Ukrainian reconciliation efforts. The Ukrainian media accused the director of making a biased film "based only on Polish historical sources". The first such screening was planned by the Polish embassy in Kyiv. It was to have been followed by a discussion with the director. Among the Ukrainian guests invited to attend was the president, prime minister and some MPs. However, Ukraine's foreign ministry strongly recommended the Polish embassy to call off the screening for the sake of "public order". Accordingly, the Polish Foreign Ministry spokesman Rafał Sobczak said that the introductory screening had been cancelled. Talks might be held about a possible new date of limited viewing. The Polish Institute in Kyiv followed the recommendation from Ukraine's foreign ministry and called off the presentation of a film set against the backdrop of World War II massacres.

During the production of the film, some Ukrainian actors who were invited to play characters rejected the offer after reading about them because they thought that the film propagated hate. Andriy Lyubka noted that after the premiere of the film "Polish-Ukrainian relations will roll back 10 years".

Nevertheless, the film received positive reception from Nadiya Savchenko, at the time a member of the Ukrainian parliament, who welcomed the opportunity to talk about painful events of the past and noted many positive developments in today's Polish-Ukrainian relations.

== Historical episodes ==
- The figure of officer in the Home Army arriving at the meeting with Ukrainians refers to the poet and officer Zygmunt Rumel, who was killed by the UPA and tied to four horses, and on 10 July 1943, his body was ripped apart.
- The scene of attack on the church refers to events from 11 July 1943 in the village Kisielin (Kisielin massacre) called Bloody Sunday on Volhynia. Similar events take place in the same day in Poryck (Poryck massacre), Chrynów (Chrynów massacre), Krymno and Zabłoćce.
- The scene of blessing of axes and scythes refers to the events from 28 August 1943 in the village of Sztuń, near Liuboml.
- The preaching in the Orthodox church took place on 27 September 1943 in the village of Iwankowicze.
- The Polish reprisal can relate to the Sahryń massacre (10 March 1944) or to the Pawłokoma massacre (3 March 1945) although in Pawłokoma, women and children were spared.
