= Defence of Zasmyki =

1943–1944 clashes in Poland

- Part of the Massacres of the Poles in the Volhynia and Galicia during the Polish–Ukrainian ethnic conflict in the World War II
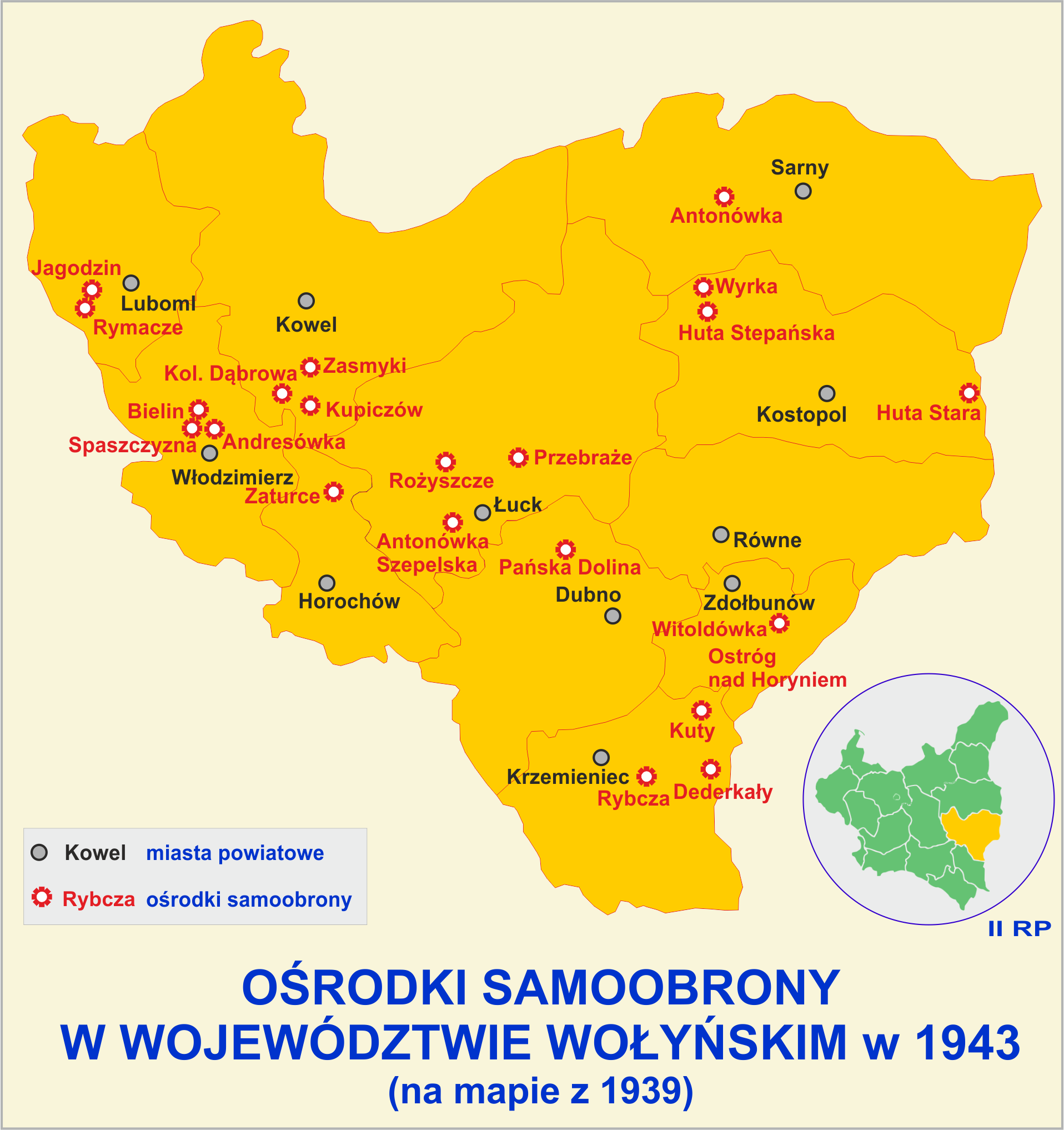
- Self-defense centers in 1943
Date	August 1943 – March 1944
Location	Zasmyki and its surroundings
Result	Polish victory

Belligerents
Polish Self–Defense; Home Army	Ukrainian Insurgent Army Germany

Commanders and leaders
Tadeusz Korona; Władysław Czermiński; Michał Fijałka	Yuriy Stelmashchuk(Second Battle)

Strength
Unknown	Higher than Polish

Casualties and losses
First Battle: 1 killed 2 wounded Second Battle: Dozen killed Third Battle: 1 killed 1 wounded	First Battle: 20 Killed; Second Battle: ~100 Killed; Third Battle: 6 to "dozen" killed
- Second Battle: 50+ Polish civilians killed Third Battle: Between 6 and a "dozen" of Polish civilians killed

The Defence of Zasmyki was a series of clashes that occurred during the Massacres of Poles in Volhynia and Eastern Galicia between Home Army and Ukrainian Insurgent Army (later on 19 January 1944 Wehrmacht) that took place between August 1943 to March 1944.

== Prelude ==
=== First rumours about crimes committed by Ukrainian nationalists ===
After the first events of the Volhynian Massacre, the Polish population in the Kovel area was not overly concerned. The news reaching them from the east was considered exaggerated and uncertain. It was believed that even if Ukrainian nationalists were indeed killing Poles in the Kostopol region, something like that could not happen in the western regions of Volhynia. Here, Poles had been married into Ukrainian families for centuries, had many friends, and felt like the indigenous population. However, the repeated murders of farmers by unknown perpetrators soon began to worry the residents of the Kowel district. Whole families were killed several times, especially near places where armed UPA units gathered. People began to think about defense, but any initiative was hampered by fear of the Germans, who forbade organizing and possessing firearms under penalty of death.

=== Arrival of Home Army soldiers ===
The first Home Army unit to reach the Kowel area was commanded by Henryk Nadratowski "Znicz". They chose the village of Zasmyki as their base, located among smaller Polish towns and protected by forests and ponds. The appearance of this small but armed unit caused the UPA to attack other towns first. On July 11, 1943, during the so-called "Bloody Sunday", Ukrainian nationalists destroyed about 100 Polish villages, murdering thousands of their inhabitants, often in an extremely brutal manner. A wave of terror swept through Volhynia. Survivors of the massacres quickly appeared in Zasmyki, bringing news of the terrible slaughters committed by both the UPA and their Ukrainian neighbors. This caused terror among the people gathered there. Two Home Army officers arrived in Zasmyki at that time: Władysław Czermiński "Jastrząb" and Michał Fijałka "Sokół".

=== The first attempts to protect the settlement ===
Both officers organized units and began hurried exercises, trying to turn volunteers into disciplined soldiers. Service ladders were established, and sentries were put in place on the outskirts of the village. Since there was a shortage of firearms, they began to buy them from Hungarians and Germans. Hunters and poachers were also recruited. The UPA patrols surrounding Zasmyki tried to mislead them about the size of the guerrilla forces by organizing quick marches near Ukrainian villages so that they would report the arrival of the "enemy" at the same time. They divided their forces and marched in the same place several times, giving the impression that Zasmyki was staffed by hundreds of soldiers. The sentries and patrols carried rifles carved from wood. Polish farmers, in conversations with Ukrainians, described huge guerrilla forces concentrated in the village, numbering hundreds of soldiers armed with cannons and machine guns. All this gave "Sokół" and "Jastrząb" time to train soldiers, obtain weapons and ammunition, and establish contacts with other self-defense groups.

== Defence ==
=== First battle ===
On August 24, a strong UPA group clashed with a Wehrmacht unit near Kovel. The Germans easily defeated the Ukrainian nationalists, and then, thinking that their opponents had emerged from a nearby village, destroyed it completely. However, it was a Polish town, Antonówka - over 50 of its inhabitants died during the pacification. It became clear to the residents of Zasmyki that they would soon become the target of an attack. The UPA soon sent an ultimatum, demanding that the Poles surrender their weapons by September 1. "Jastrząb" and "Sokół" did not respond to it. On August 29, a Ukrainian farmer got into the village, having heard about the plans for the slaughter that the UPA wanted to inflict on the Poles. Thanks to this farmer, the self-defense learned exactly where the enemy forces were. "Jastrząb" decided to attack by surprise at night. A plan was developed: Michał Fijałka was to quietly take over the forester's lodge, around which UPA forces were camped, and then give the signal to the remaining partisans to attack. At the same time, Władysław Czermiński's unit was to surround the Ukrainian positions and make a surprise attack on the Ukrainian nationalists gathered there. The action was a success: complete surprise was achieved, the excellent command of "Jastrząb" blocked all attempts by the UPA leaders to manoeuvre, and the Polish partisans showed courage and discipline. Despite being four times outnumbered (the "Jastrząb" unit had only 100 armed men), the Ukrainians were defeated and fled the battlefield in panic, leaving behind 20 dead and a significant amount of weapons and military equipment. One soldier, Stanisław Romankiewicz "Zając", was killed on the Polish side. His funeral, held in Zasmyki the following day, turned into a patriotic manifestation. Father Michał Żukowski proclaimed the creation of the "Zasmyki Republic" as the beginning of a free Republic. Dozens of new volunteers joined the "Jastrząb" and "Sokół" units at that time.

=== Second Battle ===
At the end of December, Ukrainian nationalists gathered over a thousand soldiers in the vicinity of Zasmyki under the command of Yuriy Stelmashchuk "Rudyj". They were soon joined by about 1,500 bandits from outside the UPA who were counting on robbery. Together, these forces had almost a five-fold numerical advantage over the units of "Sokół" and "Jastrząb" and the self-defense. This time, the UPA also had a very precise and well-thought-out plan of attack: first, the Home Army groups were drawn away with a mock attack on Kupiczów. When the "Jastrząb" unit reached the Czech village, the UPA quickly withdrew. At the same time, carts with soldiers dressed in German uniforms drove up to Radoml near Zasmyki. Thinking it was a random march, the self-defense unit decided to let the enemy pass without engaging in combat. However, it was a ruse - the wagons were full of UPA soldiers, who jumped out of them, opening fire on civilians without warning. At the same time, several sotnias attacked Polish villages around Zasmyki from nearby forests. The residents fled, and the surprised self-defense soldiers tried to resist. The Ukrainians did not focus on fighting, but on robbing and murdering civilians. In Radoml, among other things, a house in which several Polish families had taken shelter was burned down, killing 36 people. At that time, the resistance of Polish self-defense hardened, reinforcements arrived from Zasmyki, and the attacking UPA sotnias were stopped in the burning village of Janówka. However, the fighting Home Army units still had a huge numerical advantage against them. The units of "Sokół", "Jastrząb" and "Łuna", defending Kupiczów, learned about the fighting in the Zasmyki area and rushed to help. The UPA commander had anticipated this and organized an ambush on the route of the Home Army units. However, it was detected by the partisans and defeated in a lightning-fast attack, without any losses on the Polish side. After a frantic sleigh ride through the snow, the Home Army units reached Janówka, where an exchange of fire was still ongoing, coming out on the flank of the UPA units. At the same moment, another self-defense unit from the village of Zielona, coming to the aid of Janówka, attacked the Ukrainians from behind. There was confusion in the UPA ranks, which the Poles took advantage of, attacking from all sides. Most of the enemy units fled, only a handful withdrew in order, taking the wounded from the battlefield. Ultimately, the attack was repelled, although it cost the lives of a dozen self-defense soldiers. At the hands of the bandits more than 50 civilians from Polish villages were killed, mostly women and children. UPA losses amounted to about 100 killed, who were buried in a mass grave.

=== Third battle ===
For the next three weeks, there was peace. After its defeat, the UPA withdrew from the Kovel region. At that time, the Home Army issued an order to form and concentrate the 27th Volhynian Infantry Division. Partisan units from the entire region were drawn into the forests west of Zasmyki, leaving self-defense units in the villages. On January 19, a group of guards in Zasmyki noticed a skirmish line of soldiers approaching from the direction of Kovel. When they opened fire, they were answered by a hail of machine gun bullets. Zasmyki was attacked by a front company of the Wehrmacht, which had an overwhelming firepower advantage over the Polish units. The self-defense, commanded by 2nd Lt. "Znicz", was forced to withdraw. The German 20 mm automatic cannon, with its enormous firepower, aroused particular fear among the Poles. The Germans set fire to part of the village and broke into the buildings. However, their attack was stopped there by more self-defense units arriving to help. Heavy fighting ensued for the Zasmyk cemetery and the center of the village. During this time, the Germans, in addition started to set fire to more farms, captured and shot a dozen of civilian residents. The defense of the village could not be supported by the Home Army partisan units located nearby, due to the absolute ban on revealing the location of the units' concentration. The self-defense soldiers were doomed to fight alone. After several hours of firefights, increasingly difficult for the less armed Poles, the situation became desperate. The Germans took over the church and placed a machine gun on the tower, gaining an excellent field of fire. The situation was saved by a self-defense group from Radoml. Soldiers under the command of Sergeant "Brudny" supported the self-defense by going to the Wehrmacht's flank. In a violent exchange of fire, the Germans lost a dozen of men and a machine gun position. They began their retreat, withdrawing from Zasmyki within half an hour. The village survived, and the soldiers defending it became convinced that they were capable of defeating even the Wehrmacht, considered the best army in the world. This was the last battle of the Zasmyk self-defense - shortly after the battle, like the "Sokół" and "Jastrząb" units before it, it was incorporated into the 27th Volhynian Infantry Division.

=== Failed preparation of the UPA for the attack ===
At the begin ning of September 1943, the UPA decided to attack the self defence in Zasmyki with a large force. During the concentration, Ukrainian units encountered Germans, which led to a battle of Radovychi. Both Ukrainians and Germans suffered heavy losses in the battle. The UPA was forced to abandon the attack and order a retreat.

=== Smaller clashes of the self-defence from Zasmyki ===
Between the attacks on the settlement the "Jastrząb" and "Sokół" units continued patrolling and evacuating Polish civilians from the most endangered villages. One of them took place on August 27, 1943, a self-defense group from Zasmyki under the command of Tadeusz Korona "Groński" dispersed a UPA sotnia conducting exercises near Worona (Lubitów commune) When returning to Zasmyki, two UPA liaisons were intercepted and orders to attack Zasmyki were found on them.

== Aftermath ==
Overall about 20,000 Poles from the area found shelter in Zasmyki. In March 1944, during the German-Soviet fighting near Kovel, there was relative peace in the Zasmyki area. The resistance units had proven their strength the previous month by defeating the UPA and the Germans, so the surrounding villages were not attacked by the enemy. The Home Army organized telephone communication between the outposts, a health service with two doctors and a nursing school in Kupiczów, patrols and resistance lines. On March 17, 1944, a group of partisan cavalries observed a Wehrmacht company approaching the village. All the surrounding units were put on their feet, but seeing that the Germans were not eager to fight and were simply looking for quarters, no fire was opened. The company commander, Oberleutnant Koghouth, directed his soldiers to the school building. His tired soldiers did not notice the partisans approaching from all sides until several Polish units had gathered in Zasmyki. Then Lieutenant Mścisław Sławomirski "Prawdzic" informed the Germans that they were surrounded and that they should surrender. While the commander of the German unit was discussing this with his non-commissioned officers, Sergeant "Kruk" entered the room, ordering immediate surrender and pointing to hundreds of gathered Polish partisans. The Germans immediately surrendered. About 100 Germans were taken as prisoners and later were handed over to the Red Army, and their commander was shot for the crimes he had previously committed in Volhynia. Shortly afterwards, the partisan units left for the west as part of Operation Tempest, and the Soviets entered Zasmyki. The civilian population was deported to the surroundings of Kiwerc, from where, after the front passed, they briefly returned to their home village. After the cessation of hostilities, all Polish residents of Zasmyki were deported to Poland.

== Commemoration ==
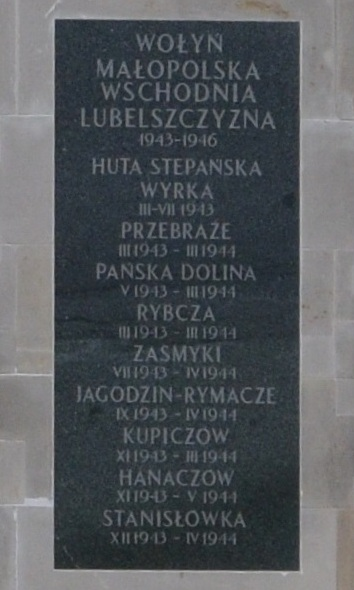
The plaque at the Tomb of the Unknown Soldier in Warsaw listing the battles for Zasmyki

Since 2017, the defense of Zasmyki against the UPA has been commemorated by a plaque at the Tomb of the Unknown Soldier in Warsaw.
