= Volhynian Bloody Sunday =

1943 attack on Polish settlements by Ukrainian paramilitary group

On Sunday, 11 July 1943, death squads of the Organization of Ukrainian Nationalists–Ukrainian Insurgent Army (OUN-UPA), aided by local Ukrainian peasants, simultaneously attacked at least 99 Polish settlements within Wołyń Province of the German-occupied Poland. It was a well-orchestrated attack on people gathered at Catholic churches for Sunday mass. The towns affected included Kisielin (the Kisielin massacre), Poryck (the Poryck Massacre), Chrynów (the Chrynów massacre), Zabłoćce, and Krymn, while dozens of other towns were attacked on other dates; tens of churches and chapels were burned to the ground. The Volhynian massacres spread over four prewar provinces, including Wołyń with 40,000–60,000 victims, as well as Lwów, Stanisławów, and Tarnopol provinces in Lesser Poland with 30,000-40,000 Poles murdered, for a total of 100,000 Polish victims of the UPA terror.

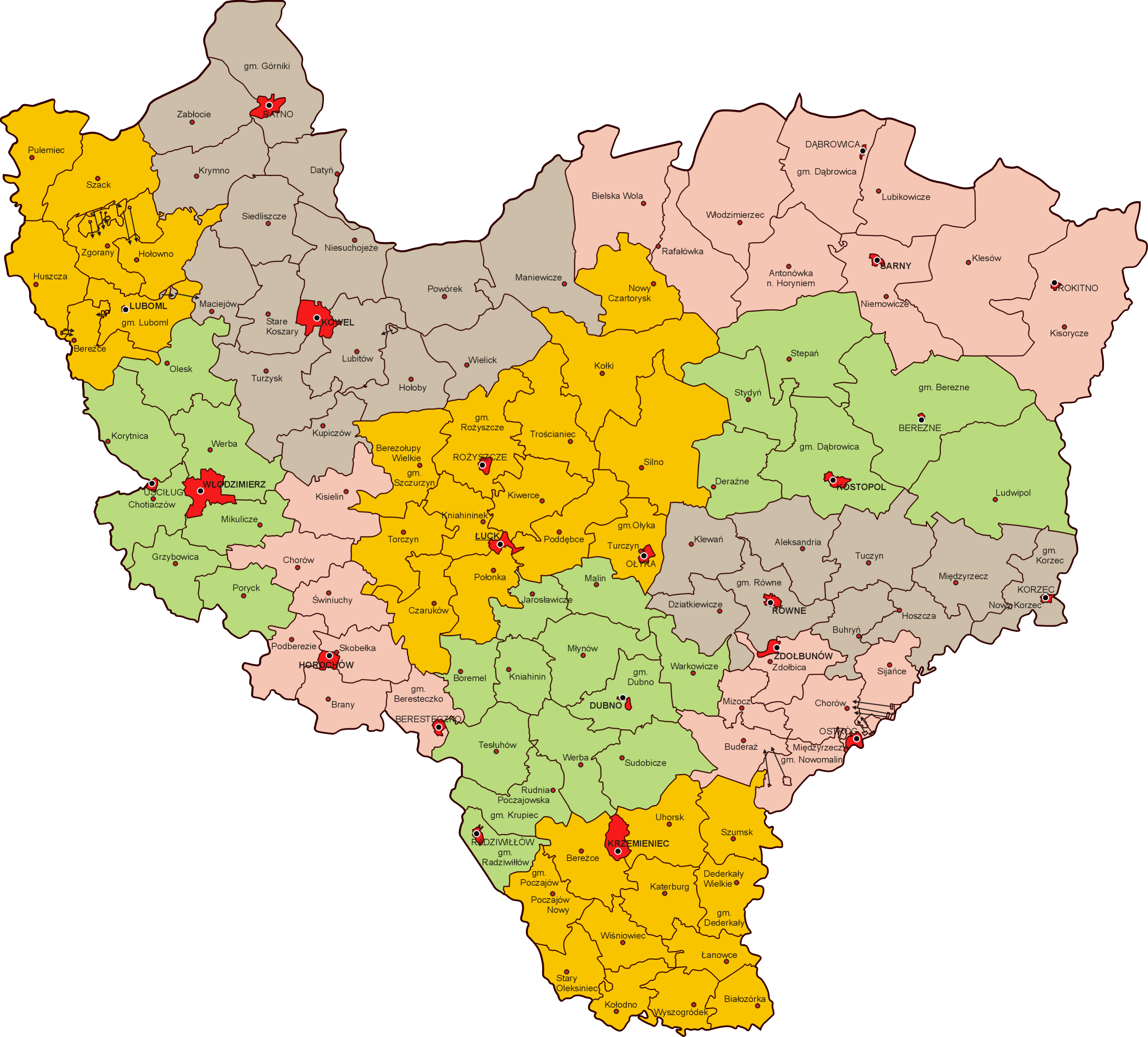
Location of powiaty Włodzimierz (top left) and Horochów (lower centre) in Wołyń Voivodeship of the Second Polish Republic with neighbouring administrative units; the epicentre of the UPA massacres of July 11, 1943

== Selected locations of the Volhynian Bloody Sunday massacres ==
Below is the list of selected locations of the OUN-UPA mass killing raids targeting Polish Catholics, with the confirmed number of victims from 11 July 1943 exceeding one dozen men, women, and children, according to the compendium of Massacres of Poles in Volhynia and Eastern Galicia compiled by Władysław Siemaszko and Ewa Siemaszko. Existing settlements that have been attacked but the number of Polish victims was unknown at the time the information was collected are not included here.

Powiat (county)	Gmina (commune)	Name of settlement	Number of dead victims	Notes
horochowski	Chorów (pl)	Bakonówka	more than 21	Polish farmhouses burned down
horochowski	Chorów (pl)	Janin estate	around 50	From Janin, departure for a raid on Zamlicz
horochowski	Chorów (pl)	Zachorów Nowy	30	Perpetrated by SB-OUN led by Wasyl Melnyk
horochowski	Chorów (pl)	Zamlicze village and estate	118	Separate article (pl)
horochowski	Kisielin (pl)	Kisielin	90	Kisielin massacre
horochowski	Podberezie (pl)	Koziatyn (pl) (uk)	21	16 killed on site & 5 attempting to flee
horochowski	Podberezie (pl)	Zagaje village	260–350	Zagaje massacre, July 11 or 12
horochowski	Skobełka (pl)	Musin (Marianówka)	all	Eradicated village
horochowski	Świniuchy (pl)	Liniów (pl) (uk)	70	
horochowski	Świniuchy (pl)	Sienkiewicze	all	Eradicated village, July 11 or 12
kowelski (pl)	Krymno (pl)	Krymno	40	Massacre at a church
włodzimierski	Chotiaczów (pl)	Bużanka (pl) (uk)	14	
włodzimierski	Chotiaczów (pl)	Nowojanka	at least 12	Polish farmhouses burned down, July 11 or 12
włodzimierski	Chotiaczów (pl)	Suchodoły estate	80	
włodzimierski	Chotiaczów (pl)	Suchodoły village (uk)	all Poles	
włodzimierski	Grzybowica (pl)	Chrynów (pl)	150	Chrynów massacre
włodzimierski	Grzybowica (pl)	Franopol	9	
włodzimierski	Grzybowica (pl)	Grzybowica	more than 34	
włodzimierski	Grzybowica (pl)	Gucin	147	Separate article (pl)
włodzimierski	Grzybowica (pl)	Gurów	202	Gurów massacre
włodzimierski	Grzybowica (pl)	Kropiwszczyzna (pl)	more than 20	
włodzimierski	Grzybowica (pl)	Nowiny	~ 80	
włodzimierski	Grzybowica (pl)	Sądowa	160	Separate article (pl)
włodzimierski	Grzybowica (pl)	Sądowa area	13	
włodzimierski	Grzybowica (pl)	Stasin	105	Separate article (pl)
włodzimierski	Grzybowica (pl)	Wygranka	150	Separate article (pl)
włodzimierski	Grzybowica (pl)	Zabłoćce (pl)	76	Massacre at a church
włodzimierski	Grzybowica (pl)	Żdżary Duże colony	51	
włodzimierski	Korytnica (pl)	Strzelecka colony	60	Attacked on July 11 or 12
włodzimierski	Korytnica (pl)	Turówka (uk)	49	
włodzimierski	Korytnica (pl)	Wydranka	several dozen	
włodzimierski	Mikulicze (pl)	Biskupicze Górne estate	70	
włodzimierski	Mikulicze (pl)	Biskupicze Górne village (uk)	at least 20	
włodzimierski	Mikulicze (pl)	Markostaw (uk)	44	Attacked on July 11 or 12
włodzimierski	Mikulicze (pl)	Mikulicze	24	
włodzimierski	Mikulicze (pl)	Orlęta	~ 50	
włodzimierski	Mikulicze (pl)	Zygmuntówka	several dozen	
włodzimierski	Poryck (pl)	Iwanicze Stare & Nowe village & colony	more than 9	
włodzimierski	Poryck (pl)	Jerzyn	51	Attacked by the same death squad as in Poryck
włodzimierski	Poryck (pl)	Kłopoczyn (uk)	15	
włodzimierski	Poryck (pl)	Lachów (pl)	at least 21	
włodzimierski	Poryck (pl)	Orzeszyn	306	Separate article (pl)
włodzimierski	Poryck (pl)	Pawłówka	10	
włodzimierski	Poryck (pl)	Poryck	200	Separate article (pl) Poryck 1943 massacre of Poles
włodzimierski	Poryck (pl)	Romanówka (pl)	more than 15	
włodzimierski	Poryck (pl)	Topieliszcze (pl)	more than 14	Attacked on July 11 or in the following days
włodzimierski	Poryck (pl)	Wolica	14	
włodzimierski	Werba (pl)	Dominopol	at least 220	Dominopol massacre
włodzimierski	Werba (pl)	Piński Most	29	
włodzimierski	Werba (pl)	Wołczak	9	
