= Volhynia (disambiguation) =

Volhynia is a historic region in Central and Eastern Europe.

Volhynia may refer to:

- Principality of Volhynia
- Volhynia Governorate
- Volhynia (film)
