= National Day of Remembrance of the Victims of the Genocide of the Citizens of the Polish Republic Committed by Ukrainian Nationalists =

Commemorative date in Poland

- Date: July 11

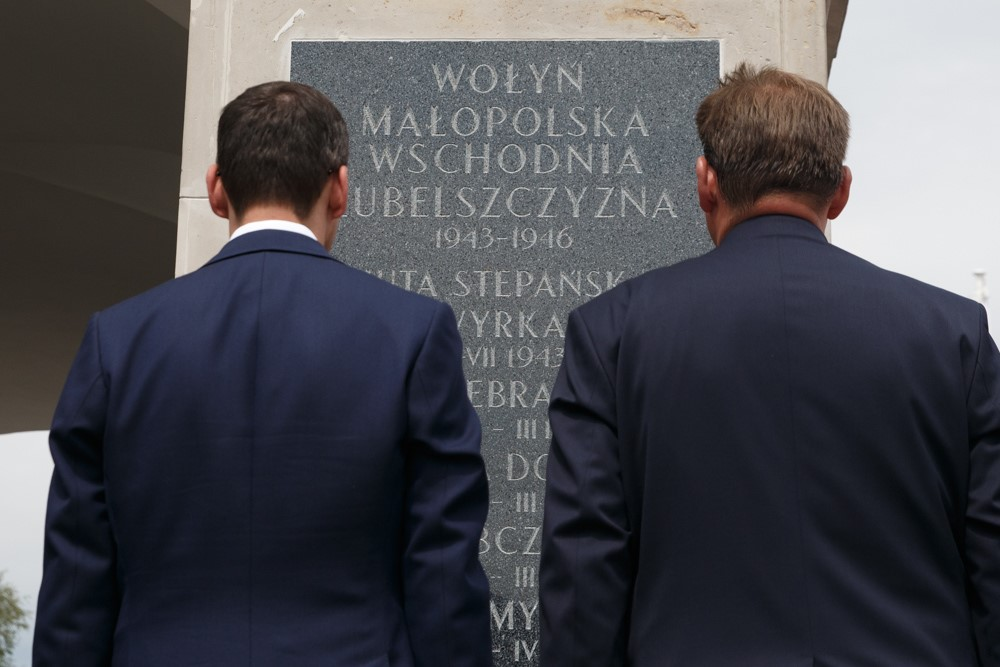
Polish Prime Minister Mateusz Morawiecki (left) at the 2018 National Day of Remembrance in Warsaw

The National Day of Remembrance of the victims of the Genocide of Citizens of the Polish Republic committed by Ukrainian Nationalists (Polish: Narodowy Dzień Pamięci Ofiar Ludobójstwa dokonanego przez ukraińskich nacjonalistów na obywatelach II Rzeczypospolitej Polskiej) is an official commemorative date in Poland, marked on 11 July. The date was chosen because it was the peak in 1943 (Volhynian Bloody Sunday) of the massacres of Poles in Volhynia and Eastern Galicia when armed units of Ukrainian nationalists simultaneously attacked 99 settlements inhabited by ethnic Poles.

== History of establishment ==
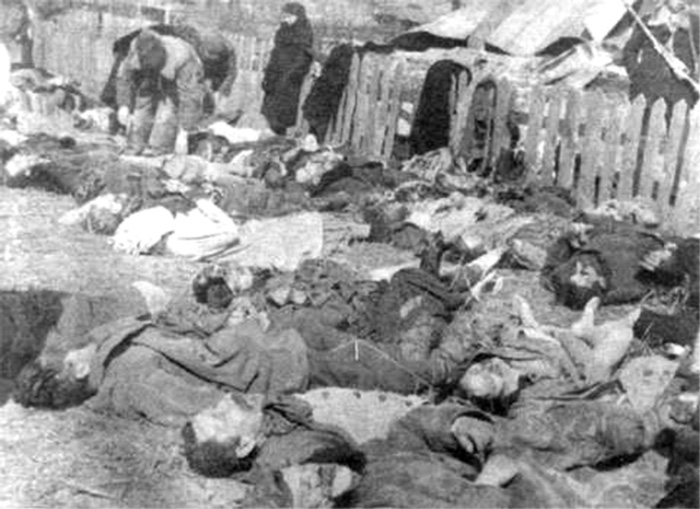
Polish victims of a massacre committed by the Ukrainian Insurgent Army in the village of Lipniki, Wołyń (Volhynia), 1943

On 15 July 2009, the Sejm of Poland, in its resolution (adopted by unanimous acclamation without voting procedure) stated, that the Organization of Ukrainian Nationalists (OUN) and Ukrainian Insurgent Army (UPA) carried out "an anti-Polish action – mass killings that had the character of ethnic cleansing and had signs of genocide." In addition, the Sejm "honors the memory of the Home Army soldiers, Self-Defense of the Eastern Kres and Peasant battalions who rose to the dramatic struggle to protect the Polish civilian population and also remembers with pain the victims among the Ukrainian civilian population."

On 15 July 2013, the Sejm adopted a special resolution dedicated to the 70th anniversary of the "Volyn Crime" (this name is used in the resolution), which notes that the crimes committed by the OUN and UPA had an "organized and massive scale," which gave them "the character of ethnic cleansing with signs of genocide."

On 7 July 2016, the Senate of Poland adopted a resolution "on the issue of perpetuating the memory of the victims of the genocide committed by Ukrainian nationalists against citizens of the Second Polish Republic in 1939-1945."

On 22 July 2016, the Sejm established this memorial day in memory of the victims of the Volyn massacre of the Polish population, organized by the fighters of the OUN, UPA, SS Galicia division and other Ukrainian formations during World War II. Deputies from the Polish Peasant Party proposed another name – "The Day of Remembrance of the Polish victims of the genocide committed by the OUN-UPA on the Eastern Borders of the Second Polish Republic."

On 4 June 2025, the Sejm adopted a bill establishing July 11 as the Day of Remembrance of Poles, victims of genocide committed by OUN-UPA on the Eastern Borderlands of the Second Republic of Poland. On 11 July 2025, marking the 82nd anniversary of the 1943 Volhynian Bloody Sunday, Poland commemorated the first-ever National Day of Remembrance for Poles killed by Ukrainian nationalists.

== Reaction in Ukraine ==
Ukrainian president Petro Poroshenko in his Facebook account expressed the opinion that he "regrets the decision of the Polish Sejm. I know that many will want to use it for political speculation. However, we should turn to the testament of John Paul II – we forgive and ask for forgiveness." The Verkhovna Rada Committee on Foreign Affairs of Ukraine issued a special statement in which it expressed "deep concern" about the resolution of Sejm. The far-right Svoboda party condemned the decision of the Polish Sejm.
