= Gurów massacre =

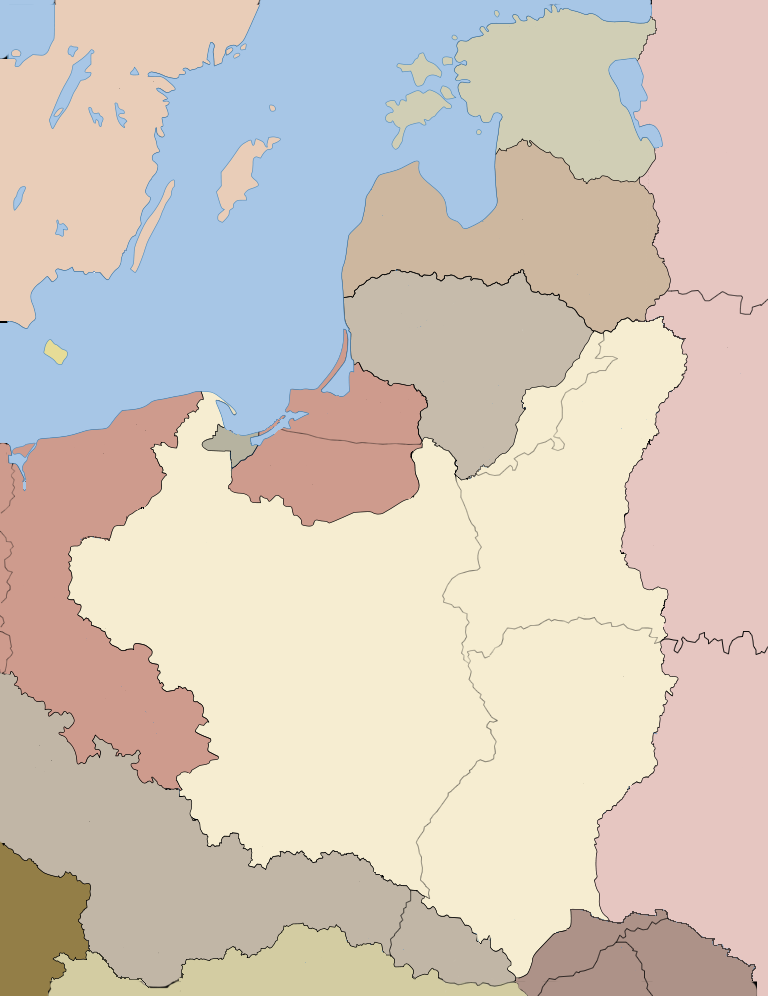
- Location of the Massacre (map of the Second Polish Republic from before the German-Soviet invasion of 1939)
- Location: 50°41′18″N 24°14′56″E; Gurów, Volhynian Voivodeship, occupied Poland
- Date: 11 July 1943
- Target: Poles
- Attack type: Shooting and stabbing
- Weapons: Rifles, bayonets, axes, bludgeons and pitchforks
- Deaths: 410 with 202 victims confirmed by name
- Perpetrator: Ukrainian Insurgent Army
- Motive: Anti-Catholicism, Anti-Polish sentiment, Greater Ukraine, Ukrainisation

The Gurów massacre was a wartime massacre of the Polish population of the former village of Gurów, committed on 11 July 1943 by the death squad of Group "Piwnicz" of the Ukrainian Insurgent Army and Ukrainian peasants, during the Massacres of Poles in Volhynia and Eastern Galicia.

The prewar village of Gurów was located in Gmina Grzybowica, Włodzimierz County, in the Wołyń Voivodeship of the Second Polish Republic (now Volodymyr-Volynskyi Raion in Volyn Oblast, Ukraine). The village no longer exists.

According to historian Władysław Filar, of the 480 Polish inhabitants of Gurów, some 70 people managed to escape death by hiding from the assailants. Historians Władysław and Ewa Siemaszko were able to confirm by name the 200 Poles and 2 Jews killed in Gurów. The massacres, which began at 3 in the morning in Gurów Wielki and Gurów Mały, spread to nearby Wygranka, Zdżary, Zabłoćce, Sądowa, Nowiny, Zagaje (the Zagaje massacre), Poryck (the Poryck massacre), Oleń, Orzeszyn, Romanówka, Lachów, and Gucin.
