= Battle of Zahoriv monastery =

Battle of Zahoriv Monastery
- Part of the Eastern Front of World War II
Date	8–12 September 1943
Location	Zahoriv Monastery, near Novyi Zahoriv, Volyn Oblast
Result	See § Aftermath
Territorial changes	Repulsing of German attacks and subsequent Ukrainian withdrawal

Belligerents
Ukrainian Insurgent Army	Germany

Commanders and leaders
Andriy Martsenyuk †	Unknown

Strength
44	First Attack: 400; Other Attacks: 700–1,500; 10 light tanks 3 planes

Casualties and losses
29 killed 2 wounded 1 executed	Heavy; Per Ukrainian sources: 90–530 killed 150–700 wounded

The Battle of Zahoriv Monastery took place between Ukrainian insurgents who fortified themselves in the monastery and German forces. 8–12 September 1943.

== Prelude ==
In early June, German administration was expelled from several districts of Volyn where UPA established their rule. During May and June, Germans made attempts to defeat UPA in Volyn and Polissia. In September, UPA clashed with Germans at Radovychi where they were victorious. After these events, Andriy Martsenyuk was tasked with occupying positions near Novyi Zahoriv.

== Battle ==
=== First Attack 8 September ===
On 8 September, Andriy Martsenyuk's sotnia occupied Zahoriv Monastery and fortified themselves there. German command responded by sending 400-strong detachment to root out the insurgents. As a result of unprepared assault, German forces suffered 40 killed. Germans attempted to set the monastery on fire, but weren't successful and suffered additional losses. One of partisans that took part in the battle described it: "Mortars were rumbling, machine guns and machine guns were rumbling... One after another, grenades exploded — everything merged into one terrible rumble. The battle was in full swing. The Germans climbed like locusts, and with them the Volksdeutsche and Vlasovtsy".

=== Second Attack 9 September ===
On 9 September, Germans received reinforcements and renewed their assaults, while insurgents further into monastery. It was difficult for insurgents to retreat, but nonetheless managed to do so and fortified themselves there. Monastery was heavily shelled and bombarded by Luftwaffe. Insurgents had to hide deep in the basements of monastery. However, German assault was still repelled at night.

=== Third Attack 10 September ===
On 10 September, numerically superior German forces heavily assaulted the monastery. UPA machine gunner on the bell tower was faced with the most difficult task of covering his squad and repel continuous German assaults. Despite these difficulties, German forces were again repelled.

=== Fourth Attack 11 September ===
On 11 September, insurgents were completely surrounded. Monastery was shelled non-stop by the Germans using artillery, mortars and tanks. Germans called in all sorts of fire support in attempt to avoid heavy losses. UPA commander Martsenyuk died as a result of intense fire. The situation for insurgents was getting more difficult, but they managed to utilize the defenses of monastery in their favour. Insurgents withstood the airstrikes and repelled the German assault.

=== Breakthrough 12 September ===
On 12 September, insurgents made a decision to break out of encirclement. Insurgents threw grenades into enemy positions and caused disorder, dividing into 2 groups of 6 people and made a sudden breakthrough assault out of encirclement while yelling "Slava Ukraini". Insurgents used the fog that arose as their cover for assault.

== Aftermath ==
Ukrainian insurgents repelled all German attacks, but eventually made a decision to break out. 12 insurgents successfully fought out of encirclement. 3 wounded insurgents remained hidden in the monastery, but one of them was discovered due to making noise out of pain and subsequently getting hanged. However, the other 2 wounded insurgents were rescued by locals after Germans left. This battle became legendary for the Ukrainian Insurgent Army.

== Popular culture ==
In 2010, Ukrainian rock band "Tartak" released a music video dedicated to the battle, which was filmed at Zahoriv Monastery itself where the fighting took place.
