= Było sobie miasteczko... =

2009 Polish historical documentary film

- Ruins of Polish Church in Kisielin today, film screenshot
- Written by: Tadeusz Arciuch, Maciej Wojciechowski
- Directed by: Tadeusz Arciuch, Maciej Wojciechowski
- Narrated by: Olgierd Łukaszewicz
- Theme music composer: Krzesimir Dębski
- Country of origin: Poland
- Original language: Polish

Production
- Producer: Adam Kruk
- Cinematography: Jan Paweł Pełech
- Editor: Grzegorz Liwiński
- Running time: 49 minutes

Original release
- Release: 2009

Było sobie miasteczko... (English: There Once Was a Town...) is a 2009 Polish historical documentary film about the 1943 Kisielin massacre in the village of Kisielin (now Kysylyn), located in the Wołyń Voivodeship in Poland before World War II, (now in Ukraine). The film, directed by Tadeusz Arciuch and Maciej Wojciechowski, was produced by Adam Kruk for Telewizja Polska.

== Description ==
The film tells the story of a small town which, until World War II, belonged to the Second Polish Republic Eastern region of Kresy. People of different nationalities used to live there in peace: Poles, Ukrainians, Jews, Germans, and Czechs. Kisielin was wealthy and prosperous. It had a publishing house, a library, an oil pressing factory, a distillery, a brickyard, and a dairy plant. Today, only ethnic Ukrainian villagers remain. The ruins of a Polish Catholic church serve as witness to the tragedy that took place there during the massacres of Poles in Volhynia. On 11 July 1943, a group of Ukrainian nationalists slaughtered the 60 to 90 Polish worshipers inside the Kisielin Catholic church, and set it on fire. The rest of the Polish inhabitants escaped from Kisielin, never to return.

The narrators of the film belong to the same Polish family of Dębski originally from Kisielin. Among them: Krzesimir Dębski, his mother Aniela, brother Wisław, son Radzimir, and niece Ulesława Lubek. Also, some ethnic Ukrainians make appearances – all present day Kisielin inhabitants – of whom the majority still remembers those events. The title of the film is taken from a monograph about Kisielin and its inhabitants, written by Krzesimir Dębski's late father, Włodzimierz Sławosz Dębski.

The music is by Krzesimir Dębski (a classical composer), inspired by his own borderland memories, especially excerpts from his Oratorio to the End of Kresy, composed in commemoration of the victims of Polish genocide in Wołyń. The world premiere of his work was held on 17 September 2008, at the Warsaw National Philharmonic Orchestra. The film is not only a story about the murdered Poles of Kisielin, it is also a reflection on the eradication of Polish culture and tradition in the entire region, and the painful legacy that lingers.

== Reception ==
Polish historian and publicist Ewa Siemaszko noted, that many Ukrainians in Volhynia and Lesser Poland today, are afraid to talk about the destroyed Polish settlements and the locations of Polish mass graves in Western Ukraine. The reason for that lies in the politicized mythology surrounding the OUN-UPA death squads in the struggle for Ukrainian independence. The OUN-UPA formations used to treat people saving Poles as traitors. Many ethnic Ukrainians paid for such "betrayal" with their lives in World War II. As a result, Poles in Poland who wish to thank those righteous today, try to avoid listing their names on inscriptions and on monuments in fear of reprisal.

The date of July 11 has a symbolic meaning in the history of Polish genocide in Volhynia. On that Sunday, the OUN-UPA death squads aided by local peasants simultaneously attacked over 100 Polish settlements within the Wołyń Voivodeship. It was a well-orchestrated attack on people gathered for a Sunday mass at Catholic churches. The towns affected included Kisielin, Poryck, Chrynów, Zabłoćce, Krymn, with dozens of other towns attacked at different dates with tens of churches and chapels burned to the ground. The Volhynian massacres spread over four prewar voivodeships including Wołyń with 60,000 victims, as well as Lwów, Stanisławów and Tarnopol in Little Poland with 70,000 Poles murdered for the total of 130,000 Polish victims of UPA terror. Wiktor Poliszczuk estimates that 36 thousand Ukrainians died at their hands as well.

In 2003, the Presidents of Poland and Ukraine, Aleksander Kwaśniewski and Leonid Kuchma, paid homage to the victims of ethnic cleansing when they met in Poryck (now Pawliwka). In 2006, Presidents Lech Kaczyński and Viktor Yushchenko met again, to encourage historical reconciliation between the two nations.

== See also ==
- Historiography of the Massacre of Poles in Volhynia
- Janowa Dolina: Destruction of a Polish settlement
- Polish defence of eradicated town of Przebraże
- August 30, 1943 UPA massacre in Ostrówki (including 246 children)
