= Michalina Łabacz =

Polish actress (born 1992)

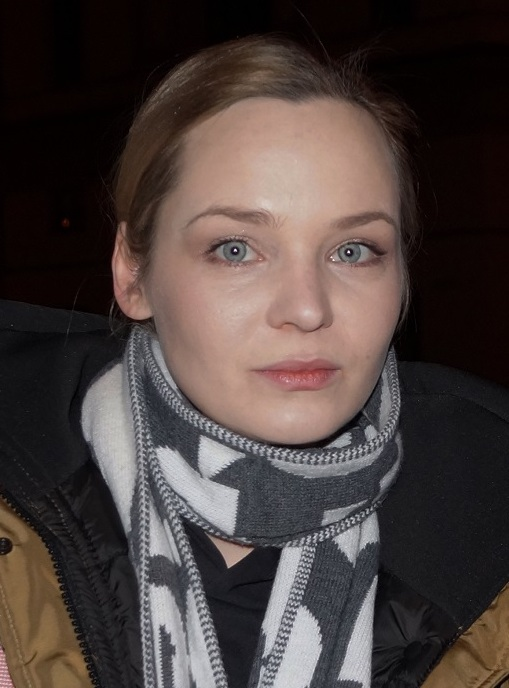
Michalina Łabacz

Michalina Łabacz (born 1992) is a Polish actress. Łabacz starred in the film Volhynia.

Łabacz won the Best Debut Actor award at the 2017 Polish Film Festival.

Łabacz studied at the Aleksander Zelwerowicz National Academy of Dramatic Art in Warsaw.
