= Kysylyn =

- Village
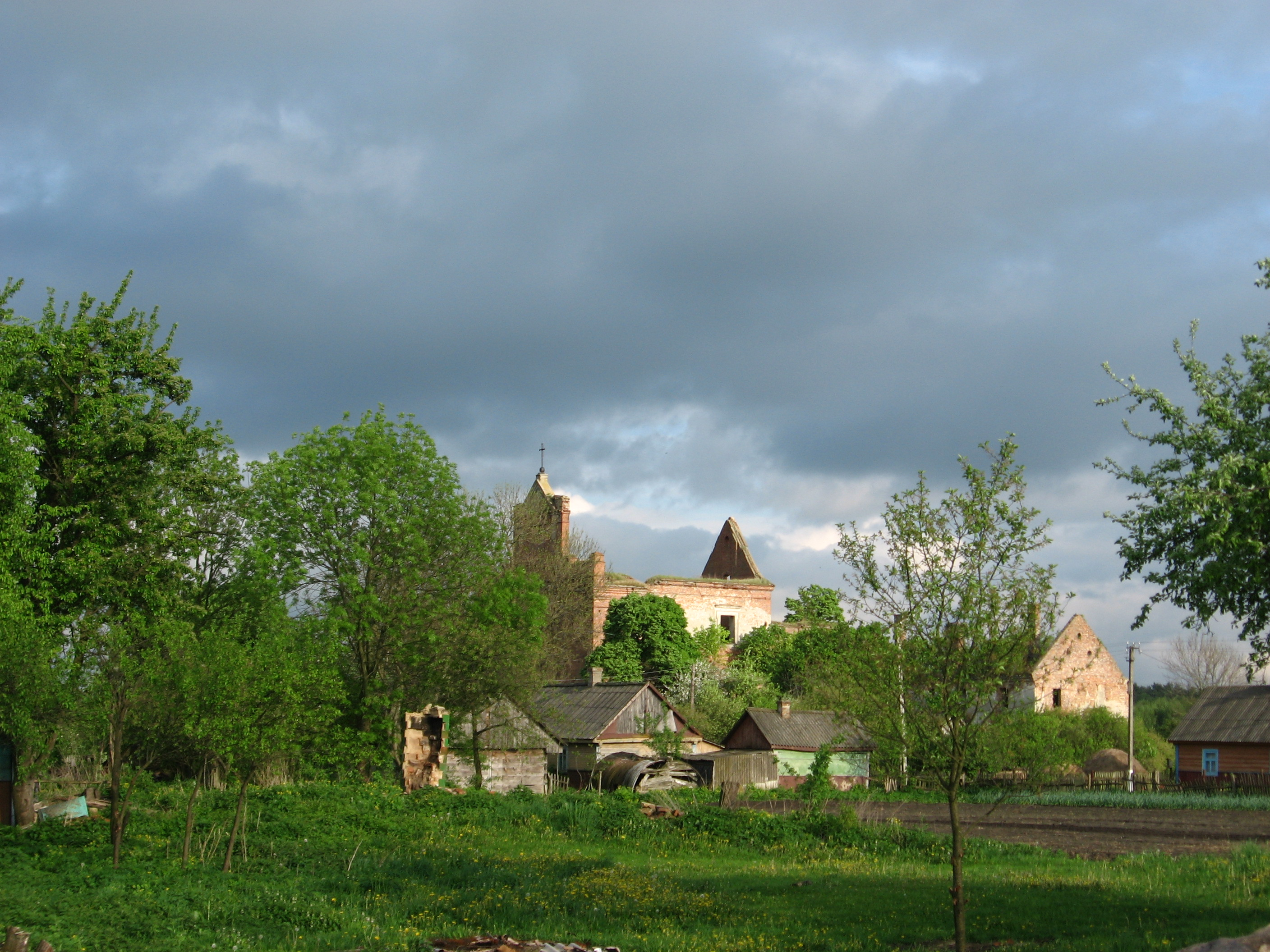
- Panorama of Kysylyn with ruins of Catholic church in the background

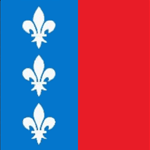
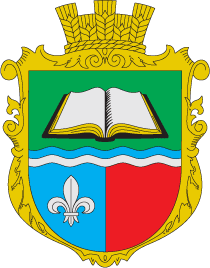
- Flag Coat of arms

- Location of Kysylyn within Volyn Oblast Location of Kysylyn within Ukraine
- Coordinates: 50°51′N 24°48′E
- Country: Ukraine
- Oblast: Volyn Oblast
- Raion: Volodymyr Raion
- Hromada: Zaturtsi rural hromada

Kysylyn (Ukrainian: Кисилин, Polish: Kisielin) is a village in Volyn Oblast, Ukraine.

== History ==
Kysylyn was founded in 1545. The first documentation of Jews in the town dates to the 17th century. During the First World War, Kysylyn was severely damaged. Sources indicate that the Jewish population declined from over 850 in 1897 to under 100 in 1921. By 1939, at least 61 Jewish households are known to have existed in the town, suggesting a population of several hundred. In addition to Jews, Ukrainians and Poles lived in Kysylyn as well.

=== World War II ===
Before World War II, Kysylyn was located within the Wołyń Voivodeship in the eastern part of the Second Polish Republic.

==== Massacre ====
According to the census of 1921, 94 Jews lived in the village. The village was occupied by Germans at the end of June 1941. The first anti-Jewish actions started at the end of summer beginning of autumn 1941. All Jews were forced to wear distinguishing badges. They were subjected to force labor, assaults and robbery. First 48 Jews were executed on August 19, 1941 on the outskirts of the village. From the first days of November, 1941 a closed ghetto was established and existed till August 1942 when it was totally liquidated by Germans who were helped by Ukrainian police. As a result, about 500-550 Jews were murdered during this Aktion.

The Ukrainian Insurgent Army, supported by a group of local Ukrainian peasants, committed a mass murder of around 60 to 90 ethnic Poles in the centre of town on July 11, 1943. The Polish citizens who assembled for a Sunday service at a local Catholic church, were killed by a machine gun. The wounded, including children, were murdered with axes and knives. The Kisielin massacre was part of the province–wide massacres of Poles in Volhynia and Galicia, with the estimated 35-60 thousands ethnic Poles and thousands Ukrainian-Polish loyalists from Wołyń killed by Ukrainian partisans during World War II. The memory of Kisielin massacre was featured in Agnieszka Arnold's 2003 feature film Oczyszczenie (Cleansing) also in film "Było sobie miasteczko..." ("There once was a town...") based on stories of composer Krzesimir Dębski.
