= Hnylche, Ternopil Oblast =

Rural locality in Ternopil Oblast, Ukraine

Hnylche Гнильче
- Location in Ternopil Oblast
- Coordinates: 49°11′32″N 24°55′40″E
- Country: Ukraine
- Oblast: Ternopil Oblast
- Raion: Ternopil Raion
- Hromada: Pidhaitsi urban hromada
- Time zone: UTC+2 (EET)
  - Summer (DST): UTC+3 (EEST)
- Postal code: 48034

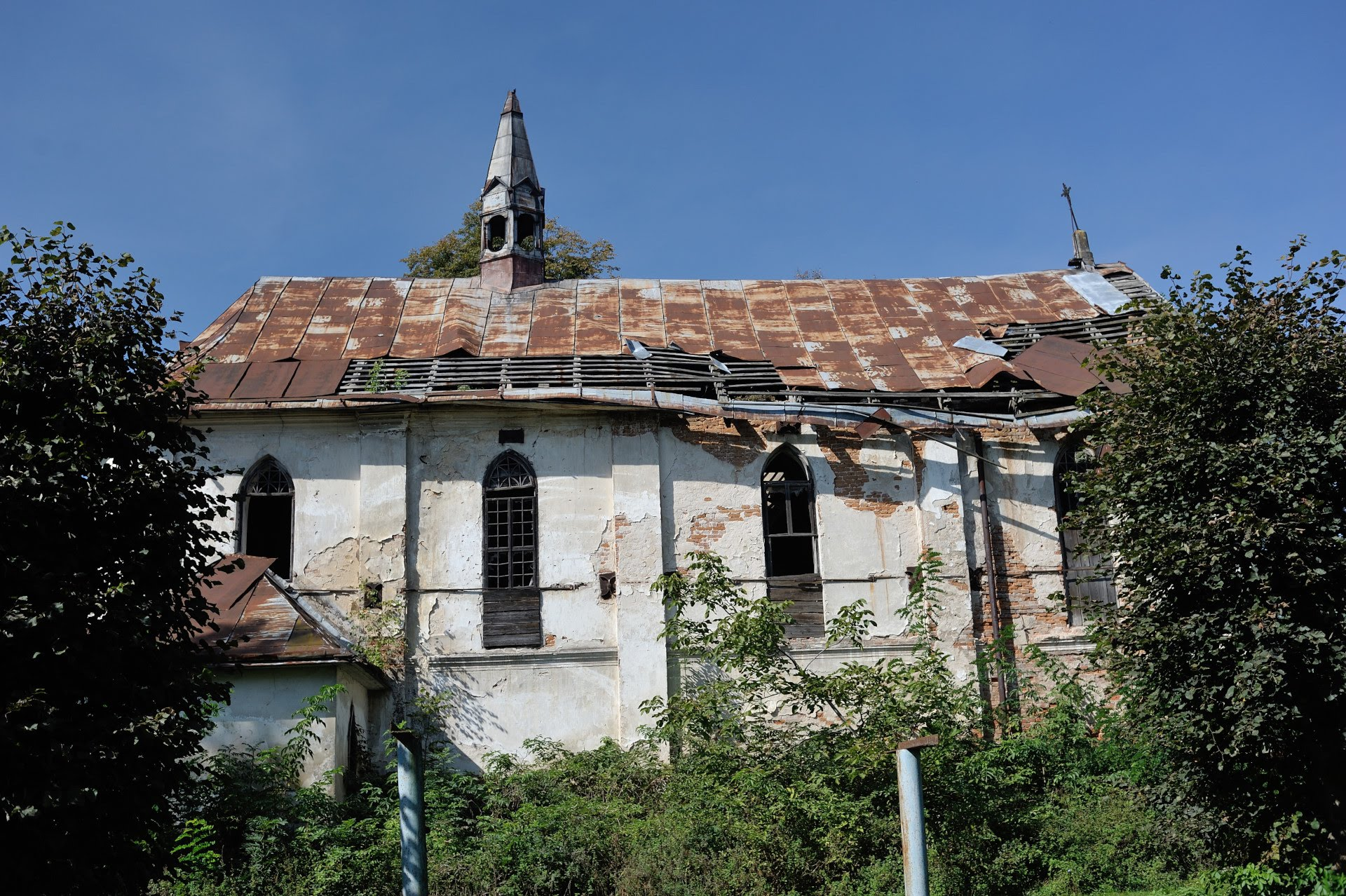
Hnilcze, Polish church from the 18th century, as of September 2018.

Hnylche (Ukrainian: Гнильче) is a village in Pidhaitsi urban hromada, Ternopil Raion, Ternopil Oblast, Ukraine.

== History ==
In 1620–1621 the village was burned by the Tatars.

After the liquidation of the Pidhaitsi Raion on 19 July 2020, the village became part of the Ternopil Raion.

== Religion ==
- St. Michael church (1930s, brick, UGCC).

== Notable residents ==
- Stanisław Srokowski (born 1936), Polish writer, poet, dramatist, literary critic, translator, academic teacher and publicist

== Sources ==
- (in Ukrainian) Скорик М., Уніят В., Гнильче // Ternopil Encyclopedic Dictionary: in 4 v. / editorial board: H. Yavorskyi and other, Ternopil: "Zbruch", 2004, V. 1: А—Й, S. 370. — ISBN 966-528-197-6.
- "Hnilcze". Geographical Dictionary of the Kingdom of Poland (in Polish). 3. Warszawa: Kasa im. Józefa Mianowskiego. 1882. p. 81.
- "Panowice, wś, pow. podhajecki". Geographical Dictionary of the Kingdom of Poland (in Polish). 7. Warszawa: Kasa im. Józefa Mianowskiego. 1886. p. 844.
