= Battle of Poryck =

Battle of the Polish November Uprising

Coordinates: 50.621°N 24.460°E

- Part of November Uprising
Date	11th April 1831
Location	Poryck, Volhynia
Result	Polish victory

Belligerents
Kingdom of Poland	Russian Empire

Commanders and leaders
Józef Dwernicki	Cyprian Belzig von Kreutz; Karl Wilhelm von Toll

Units involved
22 cavalry squadrons, 4 infantry battalions, and 12 cannons	Unknown

Casualties and losses
Unknown	250 prisoners, 100 horses and 200 weapons

The Battle of Poryck took place on 11 April 1831, during the November Uprising. Polish unit under General Józef Dwernicki clashed with Russian forces near the town of Poryck in Volhynia (today: Pavlivka, Ukraine). The battle was won by Poles.

In the spring of 1831, General Dwernicki was sent with his corps from Congress Poland to former Polish provinces of Volhynia and Podolia. His task was to spread the uprising to those lands, and Dwernicki himself was born and raised in Podolia, so he knew a lot of people in those parts. Before marching eastwards, Dwernicki stayed in Zamość, leaving the city on 3 April. He had 22 cavalry squadrons, 4 infantry battalions, and 12 cannons.

On 11 April, Dwernicki's forces were met with advance unit of forces under General Theodor von Rudiger. Polish soldiers immediately attacked the Russians, capturing 250 prisoners, 100 horses and 200 weapons. Despite this victory, Dwernicki's corps was still much weaker than Rudiger's forces. Furthermore, local population failed to support the uprising, there were few volunteers, and Dwernicki ordered his soldiers to march to Podolia, hoping to find more support for the rebellion there.
