= Stanisław Srokowski (writer) =

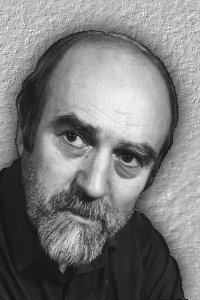
- Born: 29 June 1936 (age 90); Hnilcze, Second Polish Republic (currently Ukraine)
- Education: University of Opole
- Occupations: Writer, poet, literary critic, translator, publicist

Stanisław Srokowski (born 29 June 1936 in Hnilcze) is a Polish writer, poet, dramatist, literary critic, translator, academic teacher and publicist.

== Life ==
He was born on 29 June 1936 in Hnilcze (Ukrainian: Гнильче). In 1945, after the expulsion from the Eastern Borderlands, he and his family settled in Mieszkowice, Western Poland. He graduated from high school in 1955. He was subsequently expelled from the Higher School of Diplomatic Service on the grounds of his church attendance and the refusal to join the Polish United Workers' Party (PZPR), the Communist party which governed the Polish People's Republic. Between 1955 and 1956, he worked as a teacher in Zielin.

He made his literary debut in 1958 in Opole. In 1960, he graduated in Polish philology from the University of Opole. In the years 1960–68, he worked as a high school teacher in Legnica. After the 1968 Polish political crisis, known as the March events, he was forced to leave his post as a teacher. Between 1970 and 1981, he worked as a journalist of the Wiadomości magazine. He then worked as press secretary of Solidarity and was also a member of the Fighting Solidarity organization. Between 1990 and 1993, he lectured at the University of Wrocław. He has been a member of the Polish Writers' Union (ZLP), Polish Society of Authors and Composers and the Polish Translators' Society.

He is known for his short story Nienawiść (Hatred, 2006) as well as novels Ukraiński kochanek (Ukrainian Lover, 2008) and Zdrada (Betrayal, 2009) in which he deals with the subject of the Volhynian Genocide perpetrated by Ukrainian nationalists on the Polish population of Volhynia in 1943. In 2016, Polish filmmaker Wojciech Smarzowski directed an award-winning film Volhynia based on Srokowski's 2006 short story Hatred.

== Works ==
=== Poetry ===
- Ścięte ptaki, Wydawnictwo Literackie, Kraków 1967
- Rysy, Ossolineum, Wrocław 1968
- Strefa ciszy (The Silence Zone), Czytelnik, Warszawa 1968
- Akty (Acts), Wydawnictwo Literackie, 1971
- Ty (You), Czytelnik, 1971
- Ptaki nocy, ptaki miłości (Birds of Night, Birds of Love), Ossolineum, 1978
- Cztery pory domu, Ossolineum, 1980
- Świadectwo urodzenia (Birth Certificate), Ossolineum, 1981
- Zjadanie, Państwowy Instytut Wydawniczy, 1985
- Miłość i śmierć (Love and Death), Światowit Izba Wydawnicza (2005)
- Liryki, Światowit Izba Wydawnicza (2009)

=== Novels ===
- Przyjść, aby wołać, Ossolineum, 1976
- Fatum, Ossolineum, 1977
- Lęk (Fear), Ossolineum, 1978 (wydanie II, 1988, wydanie III 1997)
- Nieobecny, Czytelnik, 1978
- Wtajemniczenie, Ossolineum 1981
- Sen Belzebuba (Beelzebub's Dream), Ossolineum, 1982
- Duchy dzieciństwa (Ghosts of Childhood), Ludowa Spółdzielnia Wydawnicza, 1985
- Repatrianci, Czytelnik, 1988, 1989
- Chrobaczki, Ludowa Spółdzielnia Wydawnicza, 1989
- Płonący motyl (The Burning Butterfly), Państwowy Instytut Wydawniczy, 1989
- Ladacznica i chłopcy, Wydawnictwo Rubikon, 1991
- Gry miłosne (Love Games), Wydawnictwo Zysk i S-ka, 1997
- Czas diabła (Time of the Devil), Wydawnictwo Zysk i S-ka, 1999
- Anioł Zagłady (Angel of Destruction), Wydawnictwo Zysk i S-ka, 2000
- Ukraiński kochanek (Ukrainian Lover), Volume 1 of Saga Kresowa, Wydawnictwo Arcana, 2008
- Zdrada (Betrayal), Volume 2 of Saga Kresowa, Wydawnictwo Arcana, 2009
- Ślepcy idą do nieba (The Blind Go to Heaven), Volume 3 of Saga Kresowa, Arcana, 2011
- Barbarzyńcy u bram (Barbarians at the Gates), Arcana, 2012
- Spisek barbarzyńców, 2 Kolory, 2015
- Barbarzyńcy w salonie, Arcana 2017

=== Short stories ===
- Walka kogutów (Fight of the Roosters), Wydawnictwo „Śląsk", 1981, ISBN 83-216-0178-2
- Nienawiść, Prószyński i S-ka, 2006, ISBN 83-7469-380-0
- Strach. Opowiadania kresowe, Fronda, 2014, ISBN 978-83-64095-12-2

=== Biography books ===
- Skandalista Wojaczek, Izba Wydawnicza Światowit, 1999

=== Documentary books ===
- Hnilcze, Izba Wydawnicza Światowit, 2013
- Życie wśród pisarzy, agentów i intryg (Life Among Writers, Agents and Intrigues), Magna Polonia, 2018

=== Plays ===
- Gałązka jaśminu, Aktorka, Cienie, Ściana, Drzwi, Dwoje, Dziadek collected in publication Drzwi, Ossolineum, 1979

=== Screenplay ===
- Przeklęta ziemia (Cursed Land), directed by Ryszard Czekała, 1988
- Basis for Volhynia, directed by Wojciech Smarzowski, 2017

=== Children's books ===
- Bajki Ezopa, Wydawnictwo Volumen, 1991
- Ośle uszy króla Midasa, Izba Wydawnicza Światowit, 1992
- Zające i żaby (Hares and Frogs), Wydawnictwo Światowit, 1992
- Mity greckie (Greek Myths), Wydawnictwo Światowit, 1993, 1994, 1995
- Przygody Odyseusza, Wydawnictwo Światowit, 1994, 1995
- Wojna trojańska (Trojan War), Wydawnictwo Światowit, 1994
- Przygody Heraklesa (Hercules's Adventures), Wydawnictwo Światowit, 1996

== See also ==
- Polish literature
- Nike Award
