= Zagaje massacre =

Massacre by Ukrainian Insurgent Army

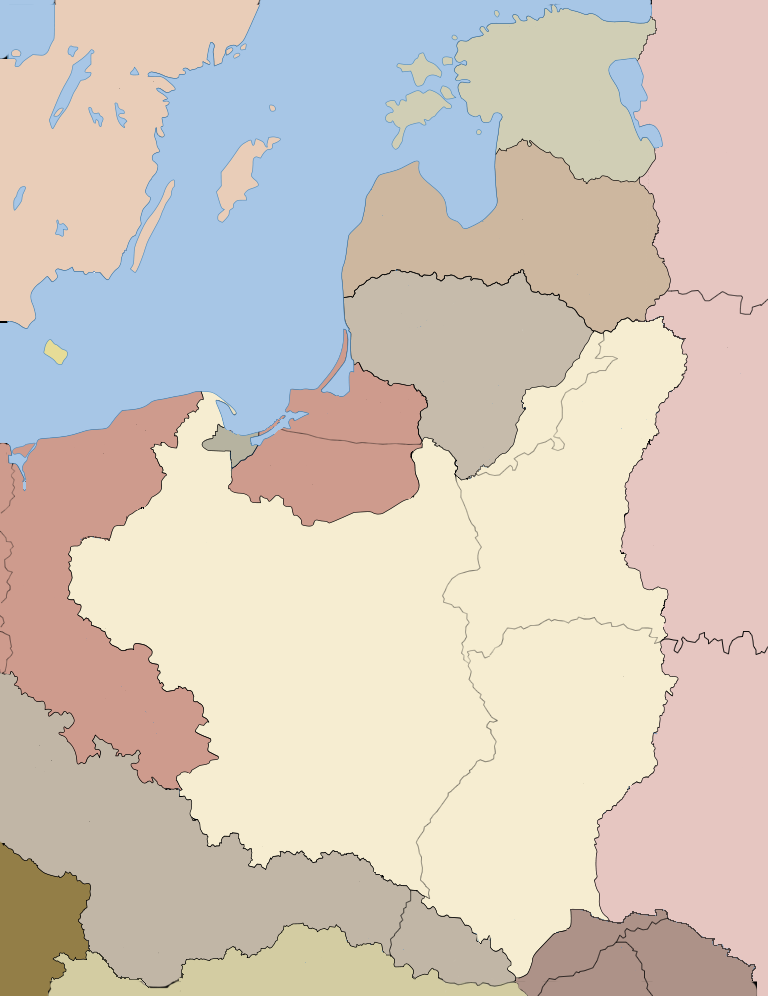
- Location of the Massacre (map of the Second Polish Republic from before the German-Soviet invasion of 1939)
- Location: 50°30′0″N 24°47′0″E; Zagaje, Volhynian Voivodeship, occupied Poland
- Date: 11–12 July 1943
- Target: Poles
- Attack type: Shooting and stabbing
- Weapons: Axes, bludgeons, bayonets
- Deaths: 260–350
- Perpetrator: Ukrainian Insurgent Army
- Motive: Anti-Catholicism, Anti-Polish sentiment, Greater Ukraine, Ukrainisation

Zagaje massacre was a mass murder of ethnic Poles carried out on 11–12 July 1943 by the troops of the Ukrainian Insurgent Army group "Piwnicz", aided by the Ukrainian peasants, during the Massacres of Poles in Volhynia and Eastern Galicia. Approximately 260–350 people were killed, including women and children. The village Zagaje was levelled out and does not exist anymore. It was located in the gmina Podberezie of the Horochów County (powiat horochowski) in the Wołyń Voivodeship of the Second Polish Republic (now, Horokhiv Raion, Ukraine). Overall, in the Horochów County some 4,200 ethnic Poles were murdered, in nearly hundreds of separate locations before the end of the Polish-Ukrainian conflict. The village Zagaje is not to be confused with the Zagaje colony, located in gmina Czaruków, powiat Łuck, of the same voivodeship.

The massacre was committed in the course of so-called Bloody Sunday of 11 July 1943, when the OUN-UPA killing squads raided simultaneously 99 Polish villages in two counties, including powiat horochowski and powiat włodzimierski. With the neighbouring powiat kowelski counted in, the number rose to 150 settlements. Most victims – assembled for regular Sunday services – were murdered in Polish Catholic churches, and in their environs.
