= Krzesimir Dębski =

Polish composer (born 1953)

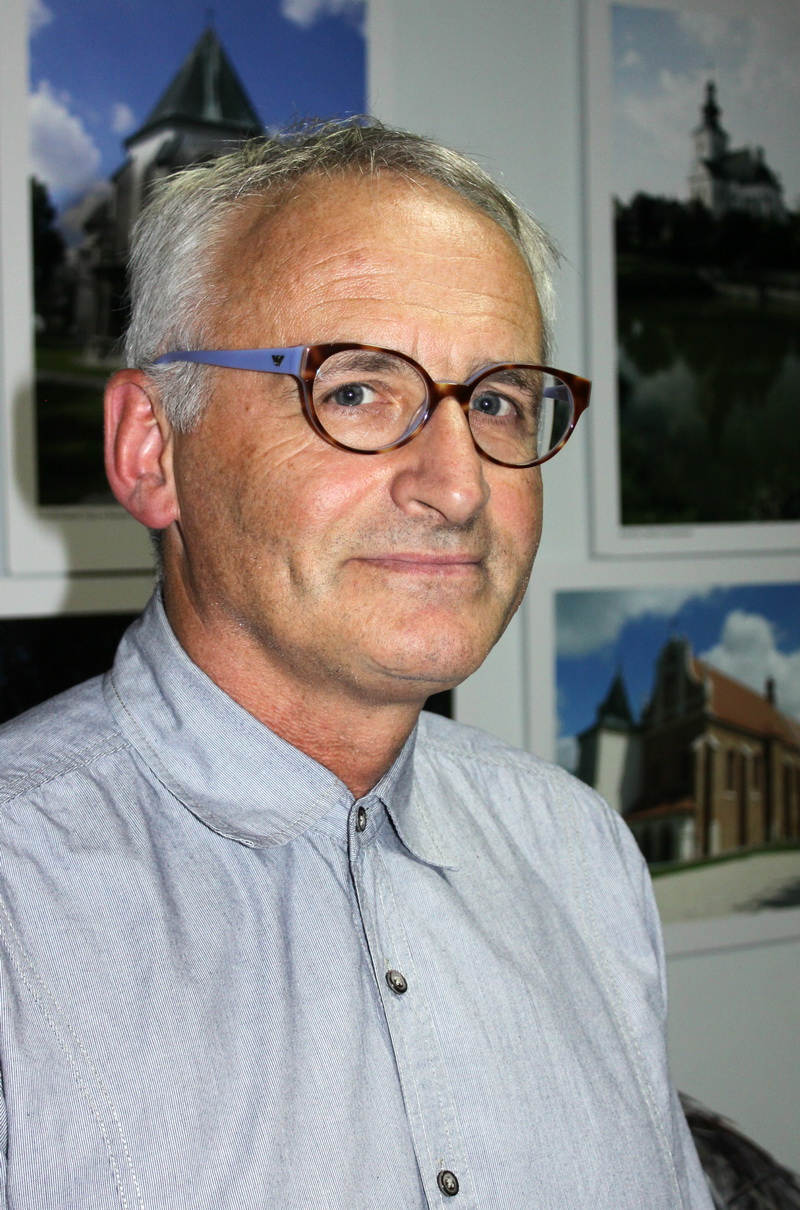
- Dębski in 2013

Background information
- Born: Krzesimir Marcin Dębski; 26 October 1953 (age 72); Wałbrzych, Poland
- Genres: Film music; classical music; jazz; pop; rock
- Occupations: Composer, conductor, arranger, violinist
- Years active: 1973–present
- Website: kdebski.eu

Krzesimir Marcin Dębski (Polish pronunciation: [kʂɛˈɕimir martɕin ˈdɛmpskʲi]; born 26 October 1953 in Wałbrzych) is a Polish composer, conductor and jazz violinist. His career as a musician has been that of a performer as well as composer of classical music, opera, television and feature films. In 2024, he became the recipient of the Gloria Artis Gold Medal for Merit to Culture.

== Professional career ==
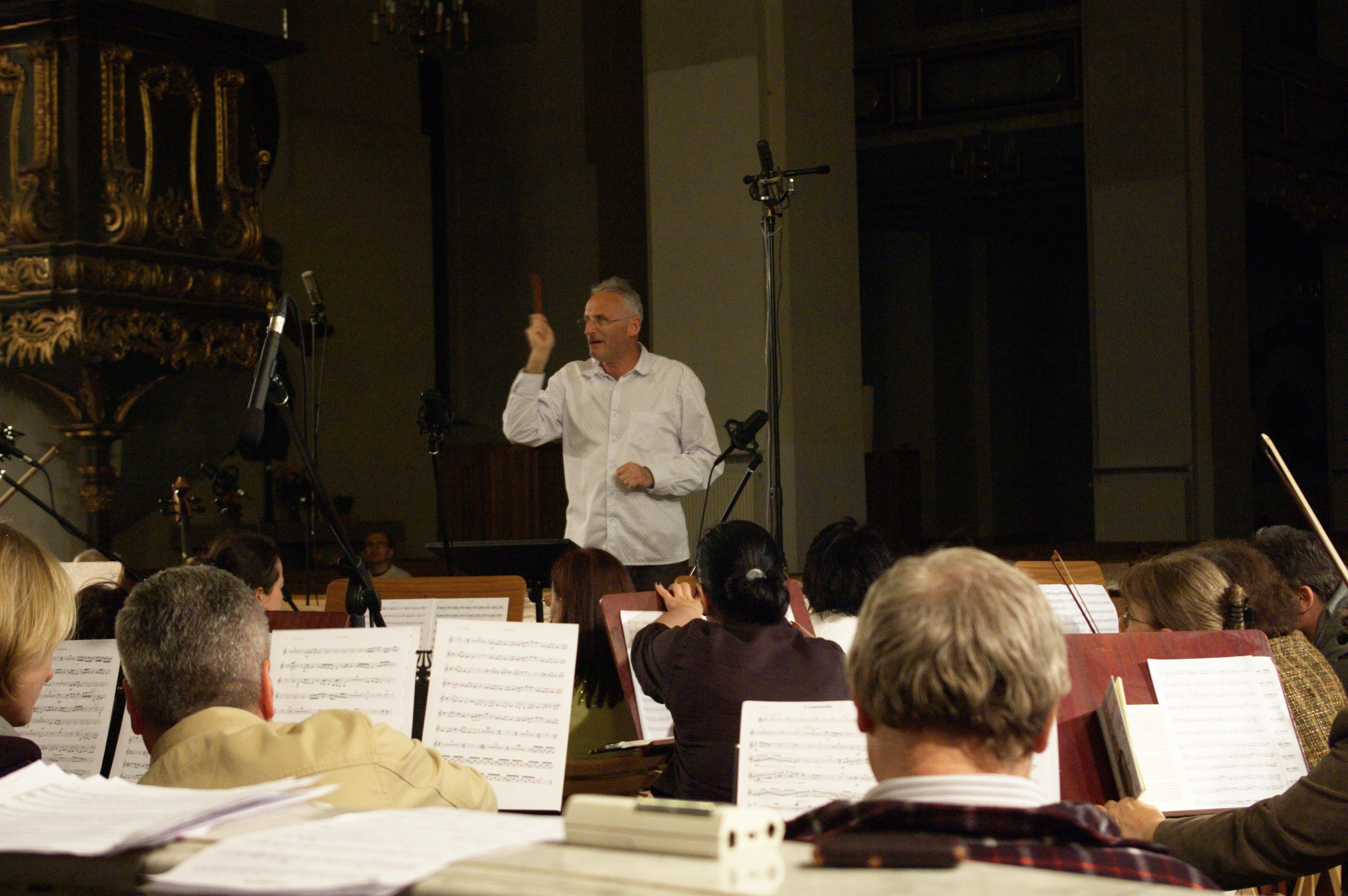
Krzesimir Dębski conducting Toruń Symphony Orchestra and Choir Astrolabium during recording session of his own Cosmopolis

Dębski was born in 1953 in Wałbrzych and began attending a music school in Kielce at the age of six. He subsequently studied composition with Andrzej Koszewski, and conducting with Witold Krzemieński, at the Paderewski Academy of Music in Poznań, Poland. Following graduation, Dębski became interested in jazz. Since 1982, as the leader and violinist of the jazz group String Connection, he has performed in the United States, Canada and over 25 countries in Europe.

In 1986 Dębski has cut down on his concert performances and concentrated primarily on composition. He has composed more than 60 symphonic and chamber music pieces, including an opera, 2 symphonies, religious works and 9 instrumental concertos. Since 1986, he has composed the music for over 70 films, received 8 platinum albums and has composed music for the highest-grossing movie in Polish film history, With Fire and Sword.

As deputy chairman of the Polish Association of Contemporary Music, Dębski has written music for film, theater, symphony, chamber orchestra and experimental ensembles. As a composer, he won the Fryderyk Award (the Polish equivalent for the Grammy Award). He was also awarded the International Film Music Academy, coveted "Philip" prize presented to him by the legendary film composer, Ennio Morricone.

Krzesimir Dębski has conducted concerts in which the following international stars performed: José Carreras, Nigel Kennedy, Adam Makowicz, The Canadian Brass, Vadim Repin, Mark O’Connor, Jean-Luc Ponty, John Blake, Ewa Malas-Godlewska and José Cura.

== Awards ==
Krzesimir Dębski has been awarded numerous prizes for his jazz musicianship and composition work. The prizes include a.o.: First Prize at the World Competition of Jazz Ensembles (Belgium), and the Stanislaw Wyspiański Award from The Ministry of Culture (Warsaw, Poland). Readers of the monthly jazz magazine "Jazz Forum" have bestowed upon Dębski the honor of "Musician, Composer and Violinist Of The Year" from 1983 to 1986. In 1985, DownBeat magazine rated Krzesimir Dębski among the top ten violinists in the world.

In 1986, Dębski received First Prize at the 25th Anniversary Spring Festival of Music, a composers' competition in Poland. In 1988, the Academy of Canadian Cinema & Television nominated Dębski for a Genie Award. The same year, he received a special award for his musical work with children from the Prime Minister of Poland. In 2000, he was awarded the Fryderyk Award in the Composer of the Year category.

In 2017, he was awarded the Pro Patria Medal. In 2020, he was granted the title of professor. In 2024, he received the Gloria Artis Gold Medal for Merit to Culture.

== Personal life ==
Dębski's parents, Włodzimierz and Aniela, survived the Kisielin massacre of 1943 perpetrated by the Ukrainian Insurgent Army (UPA) on the Polish civilian population of Volhynia and Eastern Galicia. His grandparents, Leopold and Anisia, who returned to the village after this event, were kidnapped by members of UPA and murdered. He is married to singer Anna Jurksztowicz with whom he has a son Radzimir, who is also a composer.

== Krzesimir Dębski in the press ==
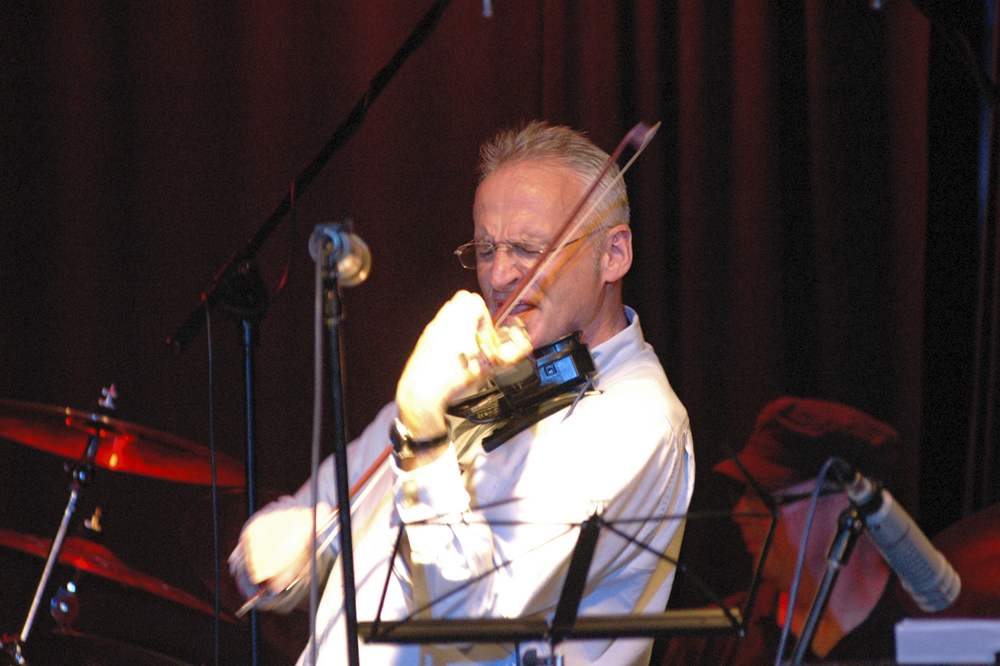
Composer and violin player Krzesimir Debski in concert.

He is most well-known as a film composer, and has written music for screen versions of many works of Polish literature; he also composes for Hollywood.

He still writes classical music, which he still regards as his most important creative task. "I have worked in nearly all the fields of the music world," he said in an interview for the "Studio" monthly in 1999; "rock men greet me as a rock musician, jazzmen - as a jazzman, still others - as a film composer. But I am personally convinced that classical music is my proper domain. I dedicate about 80 per cent of my time, or more in some periods, to the composition of contemporary classical music. Unfortunately, the world of contemporary music is so small that at times I cannot help having the impression that I could easily suffocate in it. And, for that matter, I do not seem to be fully accepted in that world. [...] ‘Oh, that's him,’ they say, ‘he's already been everywhere, done everything, does he really have to impose himself on us now?’ But I don't complain - I have many performances. So far, I have refrained from releasing my music on record (though I could have done it at my own cost a long ago), but now I'd like to announce some releases with my compositions. The "Warsaw Autumn" has never presented my works, but I hope to be found worthy of this honour when I celebrate my 80th birthday... [...]. My pieces are performed every month, also frequently abroad. I feel happy that my works are played at usual philharmonic concerts, not only at festivals." ("Studio" 1999 no. 5)

Krzesimir Dębski comments on Ukrainian nationalistic crimes in Volhynia, where his grandparents were murdered.

== Selected compositions ==
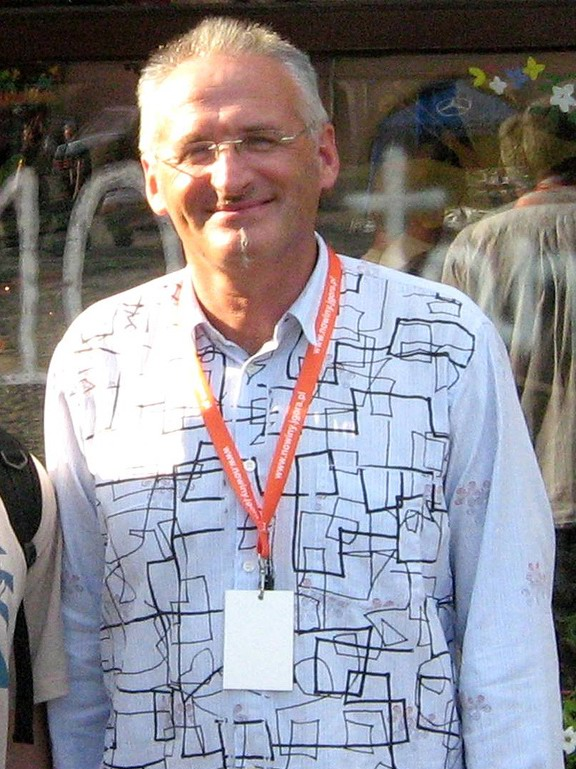
Krzesimir Dębski in 2007

=== Works for orchestra ===
- Musica per archi (1985) – for string orchestra
- Passacaglia - improvisazioni (1990) – for symphony orchestra
- Synchromie - Dance Fantasy (1990) – for symphony orchestra
- Three Forms (1990) – for symphony orchestra
- Moment Musical (1992) – for symphony orchestra
- Toccata (1993) – for symphony orchestra
- Sinfonietta (1993) – for symphony orchestra
- Preludium - Interludium - Postludium (1995) – for string orchestra
- Zyklus (1996) – for symphony orchestra
- Tempi concertati (1996) – for string orchestra
- Musica Dominicana (2001) – for wind orchestra
- Autuminty (2007) – for symphony orchestra

=== Works for solo instruments with orchestra ===
- Fantasy (1978) – for organ and symphony orchestra
- Impromptu (1990) – for violin, cello, piano and symphony orchestra
- Solo, duo, trio e orchestra (1990) – for violin, cello, piano and symphony orchestra
- Concerto for violin no. 1 (1990) – for violin and symphony orchestra
- Concerto for piano [Chechnyan] (1991) – for piano and symphony orchestra
- Concerto for French horn (1995) – for French horn and symphony orchestra
- Concerto per flauto dolce nr 1 (1997) – for flute and string orchestra
- Concerto for clarinet (1998) – for clarinet and string orchestra
- Concerto for flauto no. 2 (1998) – for flute and symphony orchestra
- Concerto for violin no. 2 (1998) – for violin and symphony orchestra
- Double concerto (1999) – for violin, viola and symphony orchestra
- Notturno (2000) – for violin, viola and symphony orchestra
- Landscape (2000) – for clarinet and symphony orchestra
- Quasi una fantasia (2000) – for violin and string orchestra
- Sounds from Serengeti (2002) – for strings, oboe and string orchestra
- Concerto for cello (2004) – for cello and symphony orchestra
- Solemn Concerto (2005) – for trompet, organ and string orchestra
- Q + O (2005) – for quartett and symphony orchestra
- Concerto for Three Clarinets (2012) – for three clarinets and symphony orchestra

=== Vocal works ===
- Oratorium Pie Jesu Domine (1988) – for soprano, tenor, mixed choir and symphony orchestra
- Missa puerorum (1988) – for boys choir, oboe, clarinet, bassoon, organ, percussion and string orchestra
- Missa brevis (1998) – for boys choir, oboe, clarinet, bassoon and organ
- Psalmodia Paratum cor meum Deus (1989) – for mixed choir a cappella
- Laudate Dominum (1990) – for female choir, oboe, clarinet, bassoon and organ
- Biografioły [to the poetry of Stanisław Barańczak](1993) – for 6 male voices
- 7 Songs [to the poetry of Wisława Szymborska] (1997) – for soprano, tenor, female choir and symphony orchestra
- Misterium (2000) – for soprano, recitations, mixed choir and orchestra
- I Symfonia Nihil homine mirabilius (2002) – for mezzo-soprano, mixed choir and symphony orchestra
- II Symfonia Ver redit (2003) – for soprano, improviser, mixed choir and symphony orchestra
- Forms (2006) – for voices, mixed choir and symphony orchestra
- Psalm nr 1 [to the poetry of Czesław Miłosz] (2007) – for mixed choir and symphony orchestra
- 3 songs Lux Aeterna (2007) – for mixed choir a cappella
- Cosmopolis (2008) – for mixed choir and symphony orchestra

== Recordings (selection) ==
- 1984 - TRIO (with String Connection)
- 1986 - String Connection Live in Warsaw
- 1991 - Montreal Ballad (Debski and Vasvari Group)
- 1995 - The Choir
- 1995 - Total Eclipse
- 1996 - Blow Up (with pianist Rolf Zielke)
- 1998 - Witaj Gwiazdo Złota
- 1999 - Ogniem i mieczem - Platinum in Poland for over 200.000 sold copies
- 2000 - Fuego
- 2000 - Era of Love
- 2002 - The Flute Concerto and The Two Stradivarius Concerto
- 2004 - Symphony Nihil Homine Mirabilius
- 2019 - Grooveoberek (with band MAP)

== Film scores (selection) ==
- 1987: The Young Magician - Director: Waldemar Dziki
- 1988: Kingsajz - Director: Juliusz Machulski
- 1991: V.I.P. - Director: Juliusz Machulski
- 1993: Szwadron - Director: Juliusz Machulski
- 1996: Matka swojej matki - Director: Robert Gliński
- 1997: Autoportret z kochanką - Director: Radosław Piwowarski
- 1998: Ciemna strona Wenus - Director: Radosław Piwowarski
- 1999: With Fire and Sword - Director: Jerzy Hoffman
- 2001: In Desert and Wilderness - Director: Gavin Hood
- 2002: Tam i z powrotem - Director: Wojciech Wójcik
- 2003: An Ancient Tale: When the Sun Was a God - Director: Jerzy Hoffman
- 2009: Było sobie miasteczko... (There once was a town...) directed by Tadeusz Arciuch and Maciej Wojciechowski
- 2011: Battle of Warsaw 1920 - Director: Jerzy Hoffman
- 2012: Polish Roulette - Director: Olaf Lubaszenko

== See also ==
- Music of Poland
