= Chrynów massacre =

1943 massacre of Polish worshippers

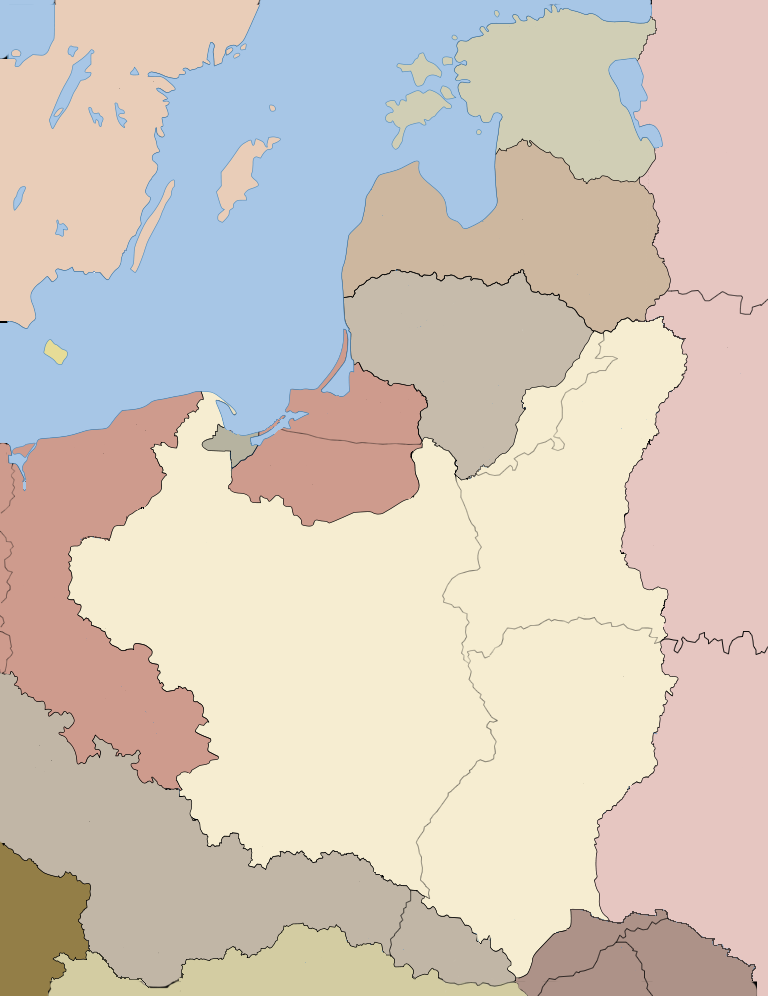
- Location of the Massacre (map of the Second Polish Republic from before the German-Soviet invasion of 1939)
- Location: 50°41′18″N 24°14′56″E; Chrynów, Volhynian Voivodeship, occupied Poland
- Date: July 11, 1943
- Target: Poles
- Attack type: Shooting and stabbing
- Weapons: Rifles, bayonets, axes, bludgeons
- Deaths: 150
- Perpetrator: Ukrainian Insurgent Army
- Motive: Anti-Catholicism, Anti-Polish sentiment, Greater Ukraine

Chrynów massacre (Polish: Zbrodnia w Chrynowie) was a massacre of Polish worshipers which took place in the Volhynian village of Chrynów, Gmina Grzybowica, Powiat Włodzimierz, Wołyń Voivodeship of the Second Polish Republic (Volyn Oblast since 1945, modern Грибовицька волость, Ukraine). It took place on Sunday, July 11, 1943, when the Ukrainian Insurgent Army (UPA) as well as armed deserters from the Ukrainian Auxiliary Police (formed by Nazi Germany), supported by local Ukrainian peasants, surrounded the local Roman-Catholic church where the Poles had gathered for a religious ceremony. The parish priest Jan Kotwicki was shot along with a group of women, when attempting to escape through the vestry. During the attack on the village Ukrainians murdered some 150 Poles. A week after these events all buildings in the village and the church were burned down to the ground, and the village ceased to exist.
