= Battle of Radovychi =

1943 battle in Ukraine (World War II)

Coordinates: 51°03′30″N 24°35′37″E

- Part of the Second World War
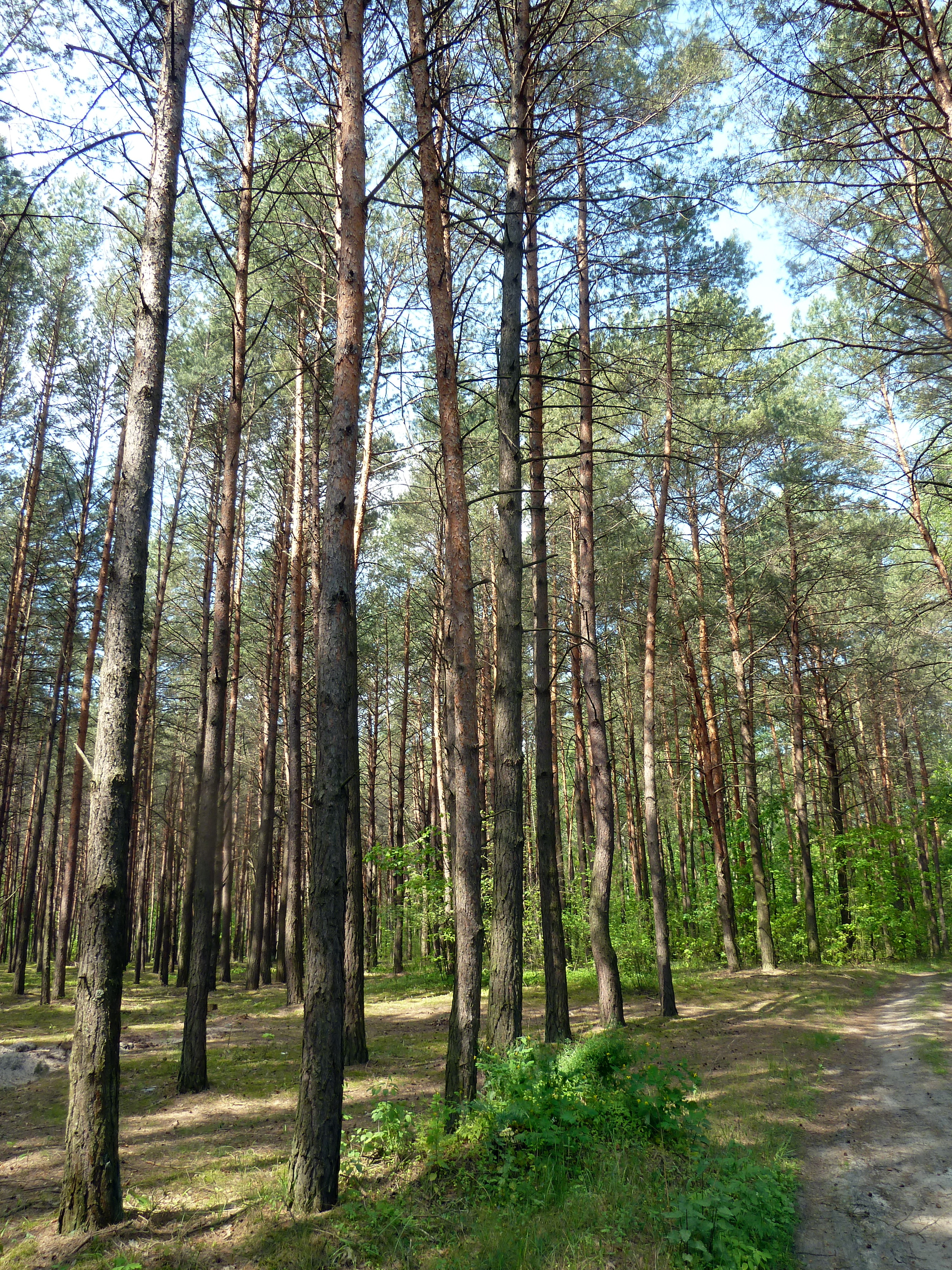
- Place of the battle of the OUN—UPA against the Germans in the village of Radovychi
Date	7–9 September 1943
Location	Radovychi, Turiyskyi Raion, Volyn Oblast, Ukraine
Result	Ukrainian victory

Belligerents
Ukrainian Insurgent Army	Germany

Commanders and leaders
Oleksa Shum “Vovchak” Leonid Povidzon “Baida” Tykhon Zynchuk “Kubyk”	(Nazi Germany) Bach-Zelewski (Nazi Germany) Hans-Adolf Prützmann (Nazi Germany) Wilhelm Günther

Strength
1,000	(Nazi Germany) 420–1,570; 3 armored vehicles 1 armored train

Casualties and losses
16 killed 3 wounded	106–300+ killed 11 captured 1 armored train damaged

The Battle of Radovychi (Ukrainian: Битва під Радовичами, 7–9 September 1943) was one the largest battles between Ukrainian Insurgent Army (UPA) and German forces during World War II. It took place near the village of Radovychi in Volyn Oblast, Ukraine. Around 1,000 Ukrainian partisans defeated 1,570 Germans.

== Background ==
In the village of Zasmyki there was a large Polish self-defence base, where the population who survived the UPA massacres against Poles, carried out mainly in July and August 1943, took shelter. UPA partisans from the "Turiv" group intended to destroy this Polish resistance point. To this end, they first carried out a purge of Poles in the village of Radovychi (Radowicze) on 5 September 1943, located a few kilometres south-west of Zasmyki.

== Battle ==
However, while preparing the attack on 7 September, the UPA encountered German soldiers, who were taken by surprise and suffered a severe defeat, losing five dead and eleven captives. The next day, the Germans sent an infantry battalion against the UPA, supported by an armoured train, three armoured cars and artillery, which the Ukrainian partisans also had at their disposal. As a result of the bloody clash, the UPA units were apparently forced to withdraw, losing 16 dead and three wounded. However, the UPA avoided being broken up and inflicted heavy losses on the Germans, which was considered a success. According to Ukrainian sources, the Germans lost 208 killed and wounded. This figure is believed to be an overestimate. Wincenty Romanowski reported only 26 killed Germans, who were buried in the cemetery in Kovel.

== Bibliography ==
- Motyka, Grzegorz (2006). Ukraińska partyzantka 1942–1960 (in Polish). Warsaw: RYTM. ISBN 83-7399-163-8.
