= Kisielin massacre =

1943 massacre of Polish Catholics by the Ukrainian Insurgent Army

Coordinates: 50°22′12″N 24°16′48″E

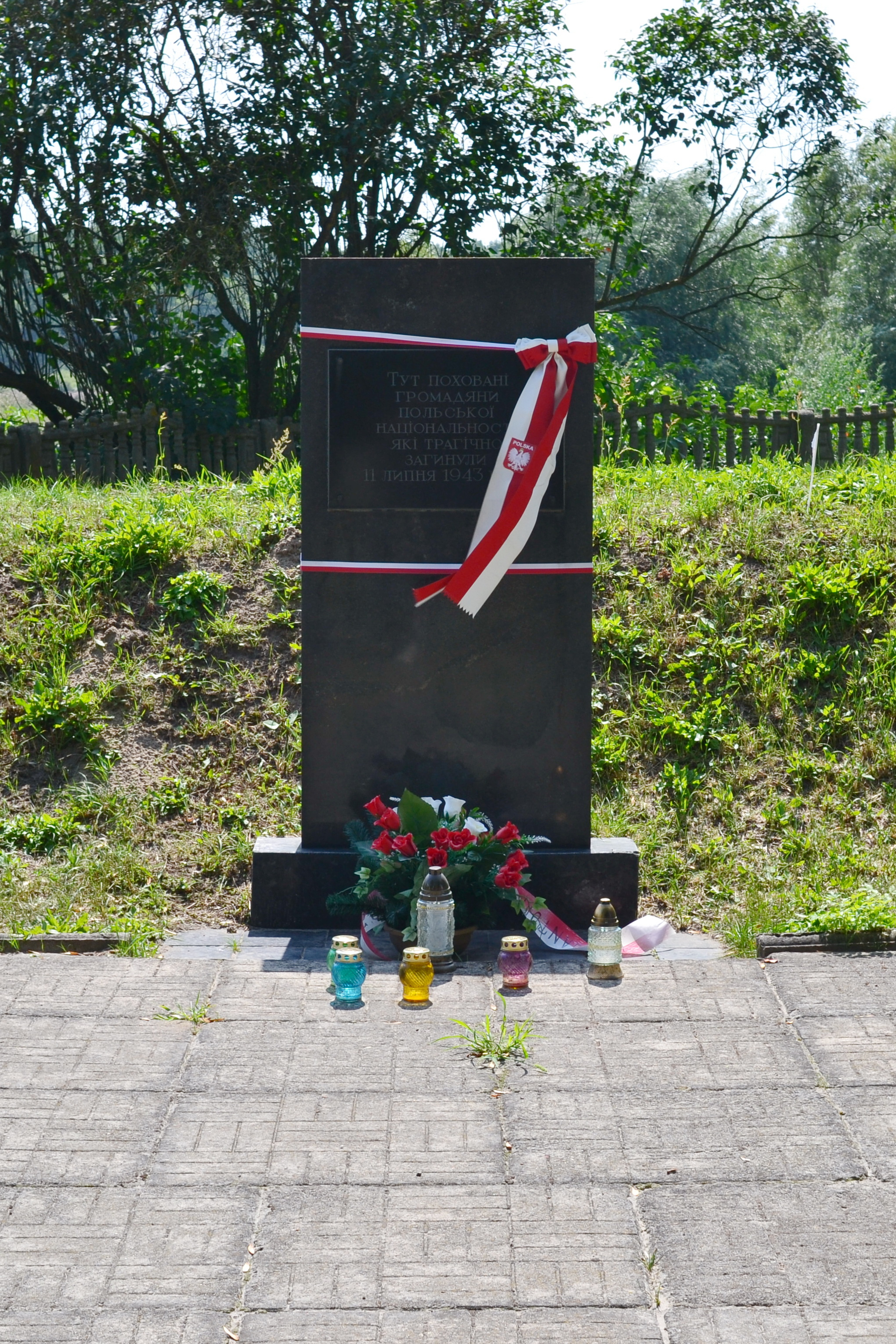
Monument at the mass grave

Kisielin massacre was a massacre of Polish worshippers which took place in the Volhynian village of Kisielin (Second Polish Republic until 1939), now Kysylyn, located in the Volyn Oblast, Ukraine. It took place on Sunday, July 11, 1943, when units of the Ukrainian Insurgent Army (UPA), supported by local Ukrainian peasants, surrounded Poles who had gathered for Sunday Mass at a local Catholic church. Around 60 to 90 persons or more, men, women and children – were ordered to take off their clothes and were then massacred by machine gun. The wounded were killed with weapons such as axes and knives. Those who survived (around 200 by some accounts) escaped to the presbytery and barricaded themselves for eleven hours.

== Background ==
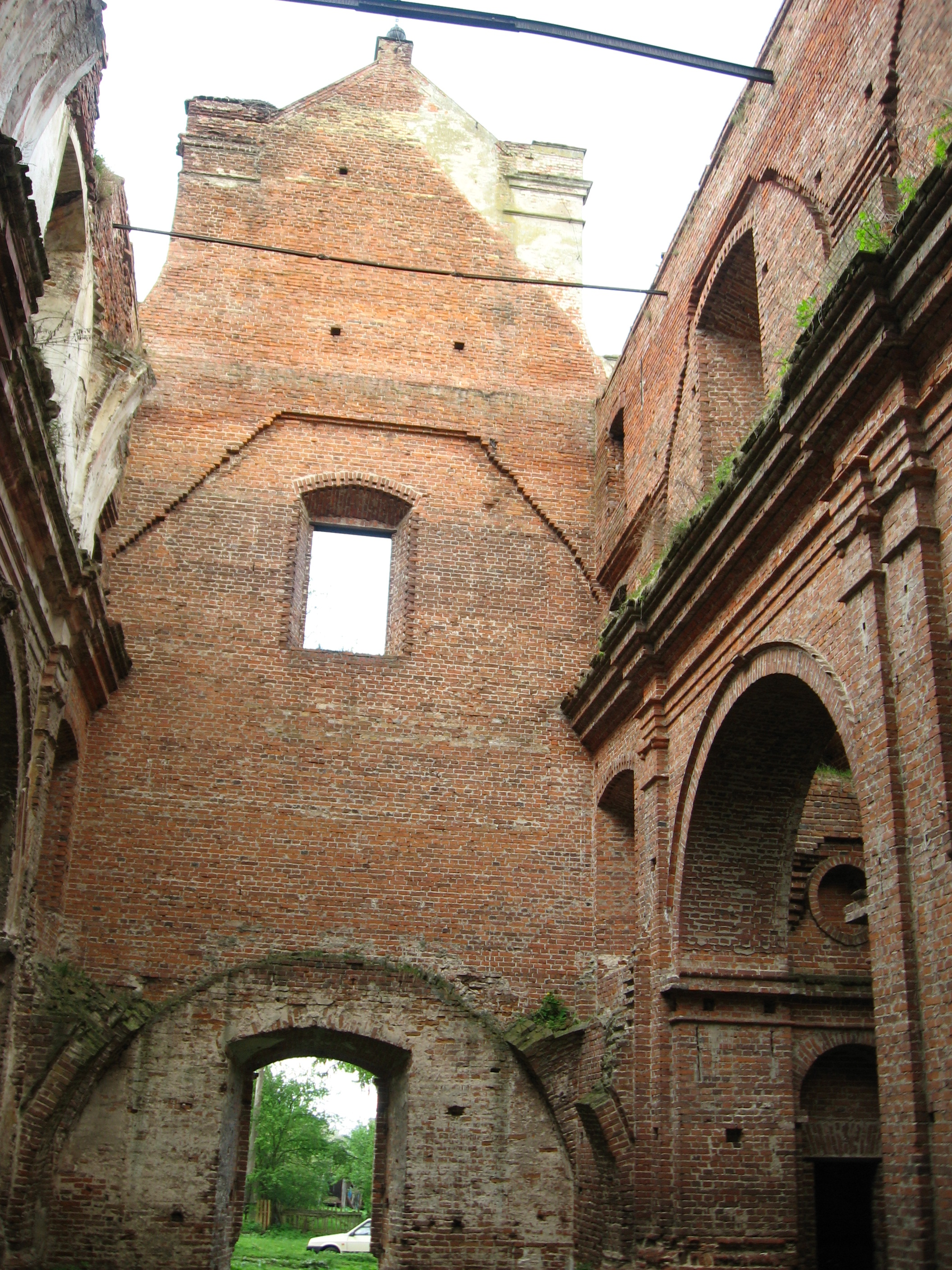
Ruins of the Polish church in Kysylyn (Kisielin), 2012

Kisielin massacre was part of a wave of the Ukrainian OUN-UPA massacres of Poles in Volhynia carried out between 1943 and 1944 during World War II, commonly referred to as the Volhynia massacres. The broader conflict in the region has been the subject of historical and journalistic documentation, including photographic projects that revisited former Polish settlements in present-day western Ukraine, focusing on memory, landscape, and the long-term legacy of the killings.

Among its survivors were parents of Polish composer Krzesimir Dębski, who in the early 2000s accompanied his mother to Kisielin. His trip was featured in Agnieszka Arnold's 2003 movie Oczyszczenie (Cleansing). Other survivors included also Faustyn Kraszewski, grandfather of Maria Minakowska, but at least five killed belonged to his family.

The massacre was a subject of a 2009 Polish historical documentary film Było sobie miasteczko... produced by Adam Kruk for Telewizja Polska. The film recounts the tragic memories of the Polish Catholics originally from Kisielin as well as those of the Ukrainians peasants who remained, but also, it is a reflection on the eradication of Polish culture and tradition in the entire region of Western Ukraine, and the painful legacy that lingers.

== See also ==
- List of massacres in Ukraine
