= Pavlivka, Volyn Oblast =

Pavlivka Павлівка Poryck
- Village
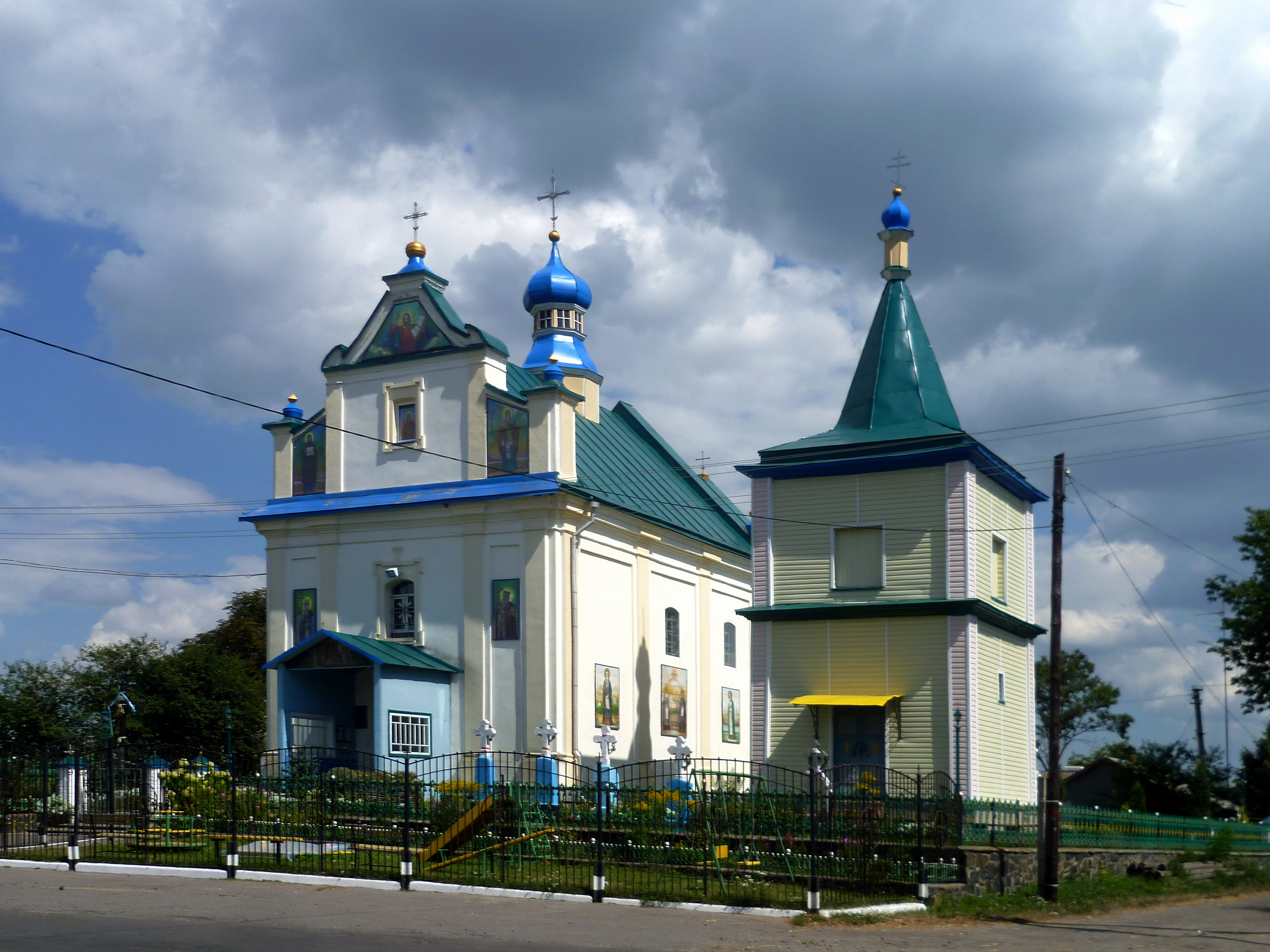

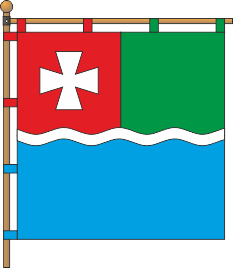
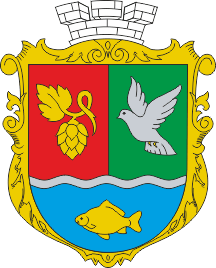
- Flag Coat of arms

- Location within Volyn Oblast Location within Ukraine
- Coordinates: 50°37′N 24°27′E
- Country: Ukraine
- Oblast: Volyn Oblast
- Raion: Volodymyr Raion
- Hromada: Pavlivka rural hromada

Pavlivka (Ukrainian: Павлівка, formerly Poryck, Polish: Poryck) is a town now located in northwestern Ukraine, in Volodymyr Raion of Volyn Oblast, near Volodymyr, on the Luha river. For centuries, Poryck was the property of several noble Polish families. The town is the birthplace of Polish statesman Tadeusz Czacki (born 1765). On 11 July 1943, the Ukrainian Insurgent Army, supported by local nationalists murdered here more than 300 Polish civilians, who had gathered in a local Roman Catholic church for a Sunday ceremony (see also the Volhynian Genocide).

== History ==
Poryck was first mentioned in the first half of the 15th century. In 1557 the town burned in a fire, and King Zygmunt August allowed its owner, Aleksander Porycki to exempt residents from taxes for the period of 10 years. Poryck belonged to several szlachta families, including the Koniecpolski and Czacki families. In 1806, Tadeusz Czacki built here two empire style palaces. Located at the lake, one palace housed a large library (the so-called Poryck Library), in which a number of Polish national treasures was kept. Also, Czacki had a rare collection of fine china. The second palace served as a family residence. In 1816, Poryck was visited by Julian Ursyn Niemcewicz, who described his stay here in his “Historic Travels”.

During the November Uprising, Poryck was one of targets of General Jozef Dwernicki's raid over Volhynia, Podolia and Ukraine. On 11 April 1831, a Polish-Russian battle took place here. After a Polish victory, Dwernicki issued an appeal to the local residents, urging them to join the rebellion. In 1916, during World War I, the library was ransacked, and the china collection was destroyed, together with the Czacki family archive. The residence was burned down, and what remained of the library was transported to Pulawy.

== Poryck 1943 massacre of Poles ==
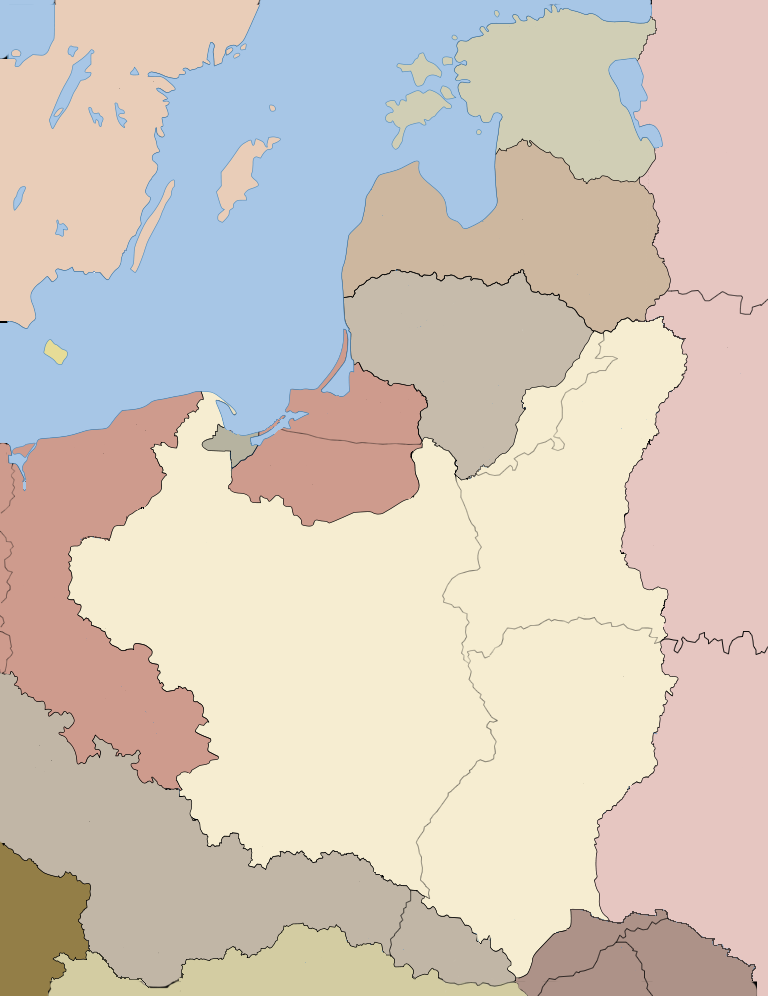
Location of the Poryck massacre
(map of Poland before the 1939 invasion)

In the interbellum period (1918–39) Poryck belonged to Poland. It was a town in the Wołyń Voivodeship inhabited by almost 2000 people, half of whom were Jewish and the remaining part mostly Polish and Ukrainian. The residents had lived peacefully together for the most part.

At the beginning of WW2 in this region, the Soviet authorities deported primarily political figures as well as all Polish officials, civil servants, police, and Polish citizens who had fled from the Germans. The exact number of Poles deported to Siberia or Central Asia between 1939 and 1941 remains unknown, and has been estimated at from under 500,000 to over 1,500,000. Additionally, tens of thousands of German-speaking people from Volhynia were also moved to German-controlled territory. (Soviet annexation of Eastern Galicia and Volhynia)

After Hitler's attack on the Soviet Union in 1941, both the Polish government-in-exile and the Ukrainian OUN-B considered the possibility that in the event of mutually exhaustive attrition warfare between Germany and the Soviet Union, the region would become a scene of conflict between Poles and Ukrainians. The Polish government-in-exile, which wanted the region to return to Poland, planned for a swift armed takeover of the territory, as part of its overall plan for a future anti-German uprising. That view was compounded by the OUN's prior collaboration with the Nazis and so by 1943, no understanding between the Polish Home Army and the OUN was possible. (Massacres in Volhynia)

On 11 July 1943, units of the Ukrainian Insurgent Army and OUN nationalists took first steps and murdered Polish inhabitants of the town. Most people were killed during a ceremony in a local Roman Catholic church. The Ukrainian sotnia of 20 men surrounded and entered the church filled with people. They threw grenades at the faithful most of whom were women and children. Then they shot at them with machine guns and finally set fire to the church with survivors in hiding. Altogether 300 persons were murdered. Later on, Ukrainian nationalists attempted to burn what remained of the Czacki palace. Their plan did not succeed, as the town was captured by the Soviet Red Army on 18 July 1944.

On 11 July 2003, the 60th anniversary of the massacre, Presidents Aleksander Kwaśniewski of Poland and Leonid Kuchma of Ukraine unveiled a monument commemorating the event. Both presidents called for forgiveness and reconciliation, with Kuchma saying "In this place where Polish victims rest, on behalf of all Ukrainians who want peace and justice, I wish to express my deep sympathy to all the wronged Poles, all those who suffered as a result of this disaster. We issue a strong condemnation of the violence committed against the Polish civilian population." — Pavlivka

== See also ==
- Massacres of Poles in Volhynia
