= Third Supreme Assembly of the Organisation of Ukrainian Nationalists =

1943 Supreme Assembly of the Organisation of Ukrainian Nationalists

- Part of the Eastern Front of World War II
- Native name: ІІІ-й Надзвичайний великий збір ОУН
- English name: Extraordinary Third Supreme Assembly of the OUN
- Date: 21–25 August 1943
- Location: Słoboda Złota, General Governorate for the Occupied Polish Region (now Zolota Sloboda, Ukraine); 49°25′17″N 25°15′3″E
- Type: Supreme Assembly of the Organisation of Ukrainian Nationalists
- Participants: 27
- Outcome: Renunciation of integral nationalism and Ukrainian collaboration with Nazi Germany for the remainder of World War II

The Extraordinary Third Supreme Assembly of the Organisation of Ukrainian Nationalists (Ukrainian: Третій надзвичайний великий збір Організаціі українських націоналістів, romanized: Tretii nadzvychainyi velykyi zbir Orhanizatsii Ukrainskykh natsionalistiv) was a meeting of members of the Organisation of Ukrainian Nationalists loyal to Stepan Bandera that occurred in the village of Zolota Sloboda (then under the Nazi German General Government, now in western Ukraine) between 21 and 25 August 1943. Held amidst World War II and a crackdown by the German government on the OUN, it was notable for leading the OUN to publicly abandon its previous support for integral nationalism in favour of democracy, though the extent to which this was genuine has been disputed.

== Background ==
The Organisation of Ukrainian Nationalists had been founded in 1929 as a merger of Ukrainian nationalist groups that adhered to the political positions of Dmytro Dontsov. During the interwar period it was popular in western Ukraine, which was under the Second Polish Republic, though it found itself politically isolated compared to other, more left-wing Ukrainian political parties such as the Ukrainian National Democratic Alliance and the Ukrainian Socialist-Revolutionary Party. The OUN was rejected by most other western Ukrainian political parties, as well as with the Ukrainian Greek Catholic Church, which the majority of Ukrainians in western Ukraine are members of. Upon the beginning of World War II the OUN began collaborating with Nazi Germany, viewing Germany as an ally against the Soviet Union (which controlled most of Ukraine at the time) in the OUN's quest for a Ukrainian state.

Shortly prior to the beginning of Operation Barbarossa, members of the OUN loyal to Stepan Bandera split with those who favoured leader Andriy Melnyk over the issue of the latter's age; both initially collaborated with Nazi Germany, but Bandera's followers were arrested after declaring the restoration of Ukrainian independence. The Polesian Sich was founded in response to German atrocities, and though it was initially loyal to Melnyk, it was later coopted by Banderites and transformed into the Ukrainian Insurgent Army (UPA). At the same time, control over the Banderites' OUN wing changed hands multiple times, going from Mykola Lebed to Roman Shukhevych after the arrest of Bandera.

The victory of the Soviet Union at the Battle of Stalingrad, as well as the general unpopularity of the OUN's proposed authoritarian policies in Soviet-controlled central and eastern Ukraine, led to a general realignment by Banderites in an effort to position themselves as a pro-Western body. At the same time, however, the OUN had begun a series of massacres targeting ethnic Poles living in western Ukraine. These, as well as the UPA's launching of an insurgency against the Germans, had been organised by Shukhevych and his "Volhynia clique" of followers, who believed that simultaneous guerrilla warfare against the Poles, the Germans and the Soviets (then represented by the partisan units of Sydir Kovpak) was the only possible way to secure Ukrainian independence. This combination of military and political factors would prove as the basis for the Third Supreme Assembly.

== Supreme Assembly ==
On 21 August 1943 members of the OUN loyal to Bandera gathered in the village of Zolota Sloboda (Polish: Słoboda Złota), which was under the control of the Germans' General Government. 26 were in attendance: Mykola Arsenych, Yakiv Busel, Roman Kravchuk, Vasyl Kuk, Omelian Lohush, Dmytro Maivskyi, Zynovii Martsiuk, Vasyl Okhrymovych, Mykhailo Palidovych, Yosyp Pozychaniuk, Myroslav Prokop, Daria Rebet Shukhevych, Mykhailo Stepaniak, Vasyl Sydor, Vasyl Turkovskyi and Rostyslav Voloshyn. They were joined by Ivan Hrynokh, a Greek Catholic priest who was not a member of the OUN. A handful of the assembled members did not believe in the legitimacy of the Supreme Assembly from the outset, feeling that the absence of Bandera as leader made it impossible to hold a formal meeting. Voloshyn was selected as Chairman of the Presidium of the Supreme Assembly, with Palidovych as secretary of the Supreme Assembly.

From the outset, the attendants found themselves divided into two camps. The ideologically-rigid supporters of integral nationalism and Bandera found themselves faced by the UPA's loyalists and younger OUN(B) members, who saw the independence of Ukraine as more important than taking specific political positions. The latter was more supportive of fighting Germany than the former, which continued in their attempts to resist and restrict efforts by the UPA's soldiers to engage the Wehrmacht.

In regards to the matter of fighting the Soviet Union, two or three groups emerged. The Volhynian clique's support for a guerrilla war, with the belief that capturing all of Ukraine would leave the Red Army significantly weakened, proved dominant. They were opposed by a more minor group of attendees (led by Lebed and Stepaniak), who believed that by fighting the Germans and subsequently emigrating they would demonstrate to the world the Ukrainian desire for statehood, feeling that any struggle against the Soviets was hopeless. A third group, attested to by the Encyclopedia of History of Ukraine, supported the enlargement of the UPA, feeling that the Soviet advance would be stopped by the Western Allies somewhere in the Balkans and that the fate of Ukraine would subsequently become a significant issue.

Aside from the war, the Supreme Assembly significantly altered the position of the OUN in regards to domestic issues. Specific appeals were made to the peasantry of central and eastern Ukraine, offering land reform, decollectivisation, removal of landowners and an end to the Soviet system of commissars. The previously-supported policy of führerprinzip, in which Bandera had the final say on all affairs, was replaced with a triumvirate between Shukhevych, Maivsky and Zynovii Matla. After Matla's arrest by the Germans, he was replaced by Voloshyn. The powers of Lebed in his capacity as leader of the Sluzhba Bezpeky were also reduced, and the rights of non-Ukrainians began to be recognised.

Dontsov's beliefs, previously the basis of the OUN's ideology, were subject to constant criticism throughout the Supreme Assembly, and letters he sent proposing policy were ignored. A resolution condemned "internationalist and fascist national-socialist programs and political concepts" in addition to "Russian-Bolshevik communism", and further resolutions were adopted calling for workers' self-management, a mixed economy, trade unions free from government involvement and broad-reaching social services.

While the Supreme Assembly was underway, massacres of Poles led by Volhynian clique member Dmytro Klyachkivsky were continuing unabated. Klyachkivsky's fellow clique members were confronted by Stepaniak and Lebed, who sought an end to the massacres and Klyachkivsky's removal from the UPA as part of a broader opposition to the UPA's existence as a separate entity from the OUN. Rather than supporting Klyachkivsky's removal, as they had in the past, Shukhevych and UPA commander Oleksandr Lutskyi gave their backing to him and his clique. The majority of the Supreme Assembly gave a vote of confidence in his activities, allowing him to continue.

== Post-war significance ==
Shortly after the Supreme Assembly, the UPA began fighting Kovpak's partisans as both began to increase exponentially in size. This marked the effective beginning of the UPA's anti-Soviet insurgency. Battles against German forces, while they did occur, were not widespread as a result of German defeat in the Lvov-Sandomierz Offensive in July 1944. This nonetheless inspired a sense of confidence in the UPA among locals, and led their ranks to further swell once the Soviets returned to Eastern Galicia and Volhynia.

The left-wing shift of the OUN during the war was not welcomed by the group's leaders after their release from prison, and the split between leftists and the far-right would prove to be a source of internal division for the UPA and OUN amidst the former's anti-Soviet insurgency. Bandera claimed after his release that the realignment had merely been a tactical manoeuvre and condemned what he referred to as "sucking up to the West". He was joined by a clique of ideological puritans who shared his belief in integral nationalism, among them Yaroslav Stetsko and Stepan Lenkavskyi. On the other hand was Lebed, Daria and Lev Rebet, and Hrynokh, who gathered around the multi-party Ukrainian Supreme Liberation Council. According to Soviet internal memos, by December 1951 this was impacting cooperation between the OUN and UPA, as the pro-Bandera faction received support from the United Kingdom's MI6 intelligence agency while the reformists (led by Okhrymovych and Petro Fedun) were supported by the Central Intelligence Agency of the United States. Within the Ukrainian diaspora, the conflict between the Supreme Assembly's supporters and opponents became violent after Lebed fired a gun at Bandera and called upon his supporters to kill him.

Since the 1989–1991 Ukrainian revolution, Ukrainian nationalists have frequently used the Third Supreme Assembly as a basis to claim that the OUN lacked far-right elements, arguing that the policies proposed by the Supreme Assembly later became part of the constitution of Ukraine. This has sparked renewed debate about the extent to which the moderation of the OUN during and after the Supreme Assembly was legitimate, and to what extent it was pragmatic.
