= People's Revolutionary Liberation Organisation =

Left-wing militant organisation within the Ukrainian Insurgent Army

- Народно-визвольна революційна організація
- Flag used by the Ukrainian Insurgent Army
- Founders: Vasyl Kuk; Mykhailo Stepaniak; Yakiv Busel
- Military leader: Dmytro Klyachkivsky
- Dates active: July–November 1944
- Split from: Ukrainian Insurgent Army
- Merged into: Ukrainian Supreme Liberation Council
- Headquarters: Derman, Ukraine
- Active regions: Volhynia
- Ideology: Democratic socialism; Revolutionary socialism; Left-wing nationalism; Ukrainian nationalism; Anti-Sovietism; Anti-fascism; Anti-capitalism
- Political position: Left-wing
- Wars: World War II; Anti-Soviet resistance by the Ukrainian Insurgent Army

The People's Revolutionary Liberation Organisation (Ukrainian: Народно-визвольна революційна організація, romanized: Narodno-vyzvolna revoliutsiina orhanizatsiia; abbreviated NVRO) was the name adopted by a group of left-wing members of the Ukrainian Insurgent Army (UPA) who were briefly active in Volhynia in 1944. It was led by Vasyl Kuk, leader of the UPA's Southern Operational Group, and included several high-ranking members of the Southern Operational Group, such as colonel Petro Oliinyk.

== Background ==
During World War II, the Organisation of Ukrainian Nationalists underwent a significant change in political position as a result of the sudden influx of members who sought independence while lacking the far-right ideology the group had previously held. This change was formalised by the Third Supreme Assembly in August 1943, which formally declared that the wing of the OUN loyal to Stepan Bandera would reject integral nationalism and collaboration with Nazi Germany in favour of democracy and a welfare state.

Further interactions with Ukrainians who had lived under the Soviet Union prior to the country's 1939 annexation of Eastern Galicia and Volhynia pushed some members of the OUN (namely Vasyl Kuk) to consider moving further to the left in order to widen the base of support for Ukrainian independence. This was refused by other leaders of the regional cells of the OUN, leading to a split between the reformists and supporters of OUN orthodoxy.

== History ==
The People's Revolutionary Liberation Organisation was established by Kuk and two of his supporters (Mykhailo Stepaniak and Yakiv Busel) on 17 or 18 July 1944. The triumvirate were given the title of "revolutionary assets", the organisation's equivalent to a leadership rank. The Cell of Ukrainian Nationalists, the central political organ of the OUN, was secretly declared to have been replaced by the revolutionary assets by the NVRO.

In Kuk's capacity as commander of the Ukrainian Insurgent Army's Southern Operational Group he called an emergency meeting of commanders in the village of Derman, where he announced the formation of the NVRO. Several officers from the Southern Operations Group, including colonel Petro Oliinyk, joined the organisation. Dmytro Klyachkivsky, commander of the Northern Operational Group (which operated in Volhynia like the NVRO) also served as a member of the group's central committee.

Stepaniak was captured by the Soviets on 25 August 1944 and sent to the city of Lviv. There, he claimed that the NVRO had been deliberately created by him on the orders of UPA leader Roman Shukhevych, alongside local commander Rostyslav Voloshyn. Vasyl Khudenko, an assistant to Stepaniak, gave testimony supporting the allegation. The arrest of Stepaniak, the ideological brains of the NVRO, dealt a significant blow to the movement.

Alongside the NVRO, another organisation had come into existence on territory controlled by the UPA. The Ukrainian Supreme Liberation Council (UHVR), an explicitly non-partisan body operating in territories which remained under German occupation, was simultaneously issuing edicts under its own name. The confusing nature of which body was legitimate between the NVRO and UHVR confused the local population and agitated Shukhevych. Further, many members of the OUN viewed the NVRO as a threat to their continued existence. Therefore, the OUN and UPA demanded that the NVRO be merged into the UHVR. The NVRO was formally dissolved by the UHVR at its November 1944 convocation in Rohatyn Raion.

=== Ideology ===
The People's Revolutionary Liberation Organisation declared its opposition to both capitalism and Bolshevism, additionally denouncing "bourgeois democracy", fascism, and Soviet authoritarianism. It called for independence of all peoples to stop what it referred to as an imperialist war between Nazi Germany, which sought "physical extermination or unheard-of terrible enslavement of peoples" and the destruction of cultural heritage "with fire and sword", and the nations of the Atlantic Charter, which refused to extend the right of self-determination to the countries of Central and Eastern Europe, the Balkans and the Baltic states. The NVRO's founding resolution called for a world revolution among the working classes of minor countries in Europe and Asia aimed at stopping imperialism.

In terms of societal issues in western Ukraine, the NVRO also took a left-wing stance, calling for the seizure of all lands belonging to the Roman and Ukrainian Greek Catholic churches, as well as landlords, and their transfer to the peasantry. An eight-hour workday was additionally promised, as was equality for women and maternity leave.

== Legacy ==
The NRVO's loyalty to Ukraine came into question as post-communist Ukrainian historiography sought to challenge established notions following the dissolution of the Soviet Union, with them being described as willing to compromise with the Soviets. This claim has since been contested by some scholars, such as historian Oleksandr Vovk, who describes it as a fabrication by the Soviet security services. Historian Ihor Marchuk argues that the NVRO played an important role in the existence of the Ukrainian nationalist movement into a pro-democratic, rather than nationalist force as a result of its adoption of arguments appealing to the broader population.

Members of the NVRO were recognised as veterans of the Ukrainian independence struggle by a 2015 Ukrainian law, alongside members of the OUN, UPA and UHVR, among several other groups active in the 20th century.
