= Vasyl Kuk =

Ukrainian nationalist activist, militant and academic (1913–2007)

- Василь Кук
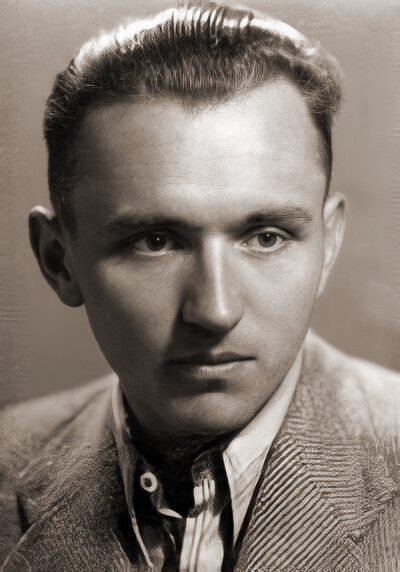
- Kuk in 1940
- Born: 11 January 1913; Krasne, Galicia and Lodomeria, Austria-Hungary (now Ukraine)
- Died: 9 September 2007 (aged 94); Kyiv, Ukraine
- Education: Catholic University of Lublin; University of Kyiv
- Spouse: Uliana Kriuchenko (m. 1944)
- Military career
- Allegiance: Ukrainian Insurgent Army
- Service years: 1942–1954
- Nicknames: Yurii Lemish, Vasyl Koval
- Conflicts: World War II; Anti-Soviet resistance by the Ukrainian Insurgent Army

Vasyl Stepanovych Kuk (Ukrainian: Василь Степанович Кук; 11 January 1913 – 9 September 2007) was a Ukrainian nationalist activist, militant, and academic who was the last commander-in-chief of the Ukrainian Insurgent Army from the 1950 death of Roman Shukhevych until his 1954 capture by the KGB. From 1960 to 1972 and from 1991 until his death, he worked as an academic, first as a musicologist and later as a historian of the OUN.

Born to a family of peasants, Kuk joined the Organisation of Ukrainian Nationalists in 1929. During World War II, he was a leading advocate for the OUN to fight Nazi Germany, rather than Polish and Soviet guerrillas, and he led the left-wing People's Revolutionary Liberation Organisation, a short-lived splinter from the OUN. After his 1954 capture, he spent six years in pre-trial detention before being released after agreeing to support the Soviet government. After his release, he researched composer Artemy Vedel. Due to similarities between Vedel's internment and the political abuse of psychiatry in the Soviet Union, Kuk's research was supported by members of the Ukrainian intelligentsia. Barred from working in academia after 1972, he resumed his activities as a historian following the dissolution of the Soviet Union, contributing to the Litopys UPA series. Kuk died in poverty in 2007.

== Early life and family ==
Vasyl Stepanovych Kuk was born in the village of Krasne in Austria-Hungary (now in Lviv Oblast, Ukraine) on 11 January 1913 to Stepan and Paraskoviia Kuk. The eldest of the family's six children who lived to adulthood, Vasyl grew up in an impoverished, Traditionalist Catholic peasant family, and was baptised in the Ukrainian Greek Catholic Church five days after his birth. Kuk's early life was defined by the First World War and the subsequent Polish–Ukrainian and Polish–Soviet wars that followed; during World War I, his father was evacuated to Graz as a railway worker, while he was evacuated with the rest of his family to Nadvirna.

Kuk studied at the Zolochiv gymnasium. There, he was significantly influenced by the gymnasium's director, Mykola Khmiliovskyi, a Catholic priest who had previously served as a chaplain in the Ukrainian Galician Army. The gymnasium's teachers also included former soldiers of the Ukrainian Galician Army, the Ukrainian People's Army and the Ukrainian Sich Riflemen. Kuk later described his gymnasium teachers as having significantly influenced his political views and later career.

Following his graduation from gymnasium, Kuk studied law at the Catholic University of Lublin. As an adolescent, Kuk was active in several Ukrainian youth organisations, such as Plast, Sokil and Prosvita.

== Underground activities ==
Kuk joined the Organisation of Ukrainian Nationalists, a militant Ukrainian nationalist group, in 1929. His early activities within the OUN were the distribution of nationalist texts in Volhynia, and he was detained on multiple occasions by Polish police while still a gymnasium student, though he was later released. In 1933, he was arrested and held in Zolochiv prison for distributing OUN leaflets. To avoid being arrested again, in May 1937 Kuk travelled to Pidhaitsi County under a false identity (wearing a moustache and glasses), where he met with young OUN sympathisers and established a printing press for OUN materials.

Following the partition of Poland between Nazi Germany and the Soviet Union under the Molotov–Ribbentrop Pact, Kuk was dispatched by the OUN's Territorial Executive to the Lemko-populated city of Sanok, in southeast Poland. From there, he travelled to Kraków, where he met with OUN leader Stepan Bandera. At the OUN's Second Supreme Assembly in April 1941, Kuk was elected as a member of the OUN Provid for organisational affairs. This position made Kuk the fourth highest-ranking member of the OUN, behind Bandera, Yaroslav Stetsko and Mykola Lebed. From 1940 to 1941, while in Kraków, Kuk began working alongside Roman Shukhevych to prepare for the establishment of an OUN-led insurgency against the Soviets.

After Operation Barbarossa, Kuk was part of a convoy of OUN members that travelled to the city of Lviv, where he participated in the act of restoration of the Ukrainian state. (Note: The other members of the convoy were Yaroslav Khomiv, Ivan Ravlyk, Lev Rebet, Yaroslav Starukh, Yaroslav Stetsko, Dmytro Yatsiv and I. Vitushynskyi, as well as members of the Sluzhba Bezpeky.) Kuk was one of the act's signatories and was a member of the Ukrainian national government, holding a portfolio of central and eastern Ukrainian affairs.

Following the public promulgation of the act, the German government and the Wehrmacht began detaining its signatories. Kuk, who was travelling from Lviv to Kyiv along with a group of 30 other OUN members to republish the act, was detained by German police while passing through the city of Vasylkivka. While being transported by an Abwehr convoy to Lviv, Kuk, along with Dmytro Myron, escaped from the convoy in Lutsk. From there, Kuk, alongside fellow OUN commander Ivan Klymiv, organised plans to fight the Germans. Kuk was appointed as head of the OUN Provid in southeastern Ukraine, including the Donbas, Crimea, Kuban, Odesa and the Transnistria Governorate, and travelled to the southern Dnipropetrovsk Oblast to organise underground activities. While there, he met a student and OUN Youth member, Uliana Kriuchenko, who had been organising OUN activities in Kryvyi Rih and Novomoskovsk. The two married in 1944. Beginning in 1943, Kuk, Omelian Lohush and other members of the OUN underground in Dnipropetrovsk Oblast began drafting a political programme for the OUN that would be more popular among the non-western Ukrainian population. This programme was eventually adopted at the Third Supreme Assembly of the OUN later that year.

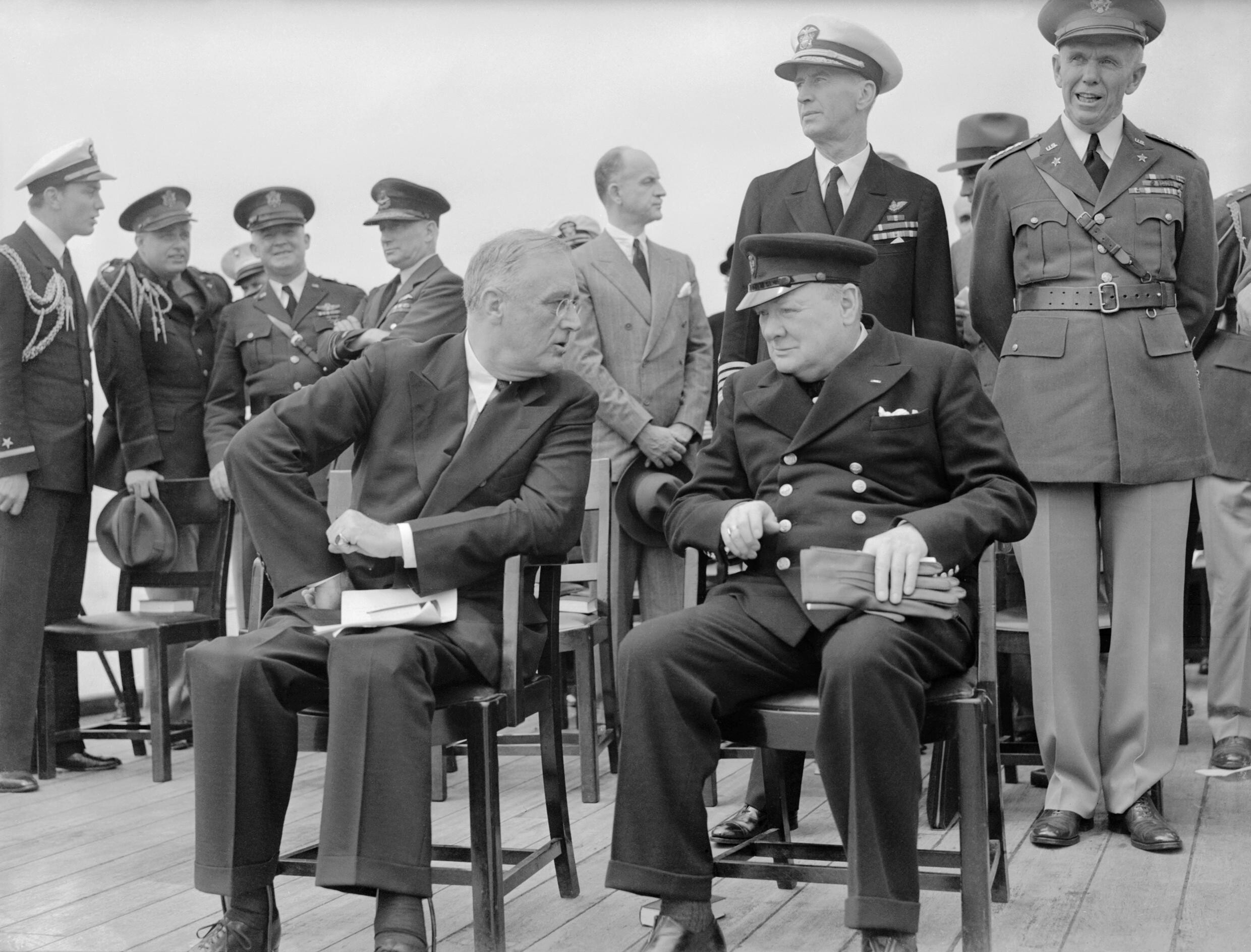
Kuk argued for the OUN to fight Nazi Germany, believing that doing so would enable recognition of Ukrainian independence by the western Allies (leaders Franklin D. Roosevelt and Winston Churchill pictured)

During the Third Supreme Assembly, Kuk advocated for the OUN to fight against Germany and establish an independent Ukrainian state before Soviet advances could return territory under the control of the Ukrainian Soviet Socialist Republic; Kuk believed that doing so would enable recognition from the western Allies. This position, also supported by Mykhailo Stepaniak, was opposed by Shukhevych and Dmytro Klyachkivsky, who felt that the OUN should primarily fight Soviet partisans and the Home Army, limiting attacks against the Germans to retaliations for killings. A compromise was eventually reached between the two sides, with the OUN condemning Germany, the Soviet Union and Poland and declaring that they would fight all three through the newly-established Ukrainian Insurgent Army (Ukrainian: Українська повстанська армія, romanized: Ukrainska povstanska armiia, abbreviated UPA).

In 1944, amidst the German retreat from Ukraine, the UPA's ranks were significantly bolstered by a number of defectors from the Soviet Red Army, including Soviet agents. The OUN's Sluzhba Bezpeky security service distrusted these defectors and, in an effort to reduce the amount of information being passed to the Soviet secret police, began summarily executing suspected agents. These killings led to disillusionment among members of the OUN and UPA, including Kuk. In an effort to present an alternative to the OUN, Kuk established the socialist or social-democratic People's Revolutionary Liberation Organisation (Ukrainian: Народно-визвольна революційна організація, romanized: Narodno-vyzvolna revoliutsiina orhanizatsiia, abbreviated NVRO) in mid-1944, alongside Klyachkivsky. The NVRO, which was based in Volhynia, was short-lived and, within the year, returned to the OUN. Kuk also served as commander of the Southern Operational Group of the UPA.

After Shukhevych's death in March 1950, Kuk assumed the role of commander-in-chief of the UPA, as well as chief of the secretariat of the Ukrainian Supreme Liberation Council (Ukrainian: Українська головна визвольна рада, romanized: Ukrainska holovna vyzvolna rada, abbreviated UHVR). Following his accession to the leadership of the UPA, Kuk became embroiled in a dispute with Bandera over the latter's efforts to obtain personal control over the UPA. In a letter to the UHVR sent in the summer of 1953, Kuk accused Bandera of ignoring the resolutions adopted at the Third Supreme Assembly, and declared in a letter that Bandera was "neither formally nor factually" leader of the OUN. Further accusations were made by Kuk against Myron Matviieiko, head of the Sluzhba Bezpeky, with Kuk arguing that Matviieiko was engaging in violence against members of the opposition. In May 1991, Kuk denied that he had written the letter, claiming it was a forgery by the KGB. Historian Pavlo Hai-Nyzhnyk has disputed this, arguing that Kuk may have been motivated by personal guilt over his later renunciation of the OUN and UPA, as well as Bandera's posthumous popularity, in denying the existence of a conflict.

Kuk was captured by Soviet forces on 24 May 1954 by a Ukrainian KGB special forces unit. Following his capture, Kuk was taken to Kyiv and other cities in Soviet-controlled Ukraine, where the Soviet government demonstrated the economic development that had occurred as a result of communism and asked whether he would like to support the government. Kuk agreed, and as a consequence was ordered to engage in public criticism of the OUN. After six years in pre-trial detention, he was amnestied and allowed to move to Kyiv, though he remained under constant surveillance by the Ukrainian KGB.

== Academic career ==
After his release, Kuk obtained a philosophy degree from Taras Shevchenko Kyiv State University.

Beginning in the late 1960s, Kuk took an interest in 18th–19th-century composer Artemy Vedel. Vedel's biography, particularly his imprisonment by the imperial Russian government based on mental illness, was a sensitive topic in the Soviet Union within the context of the government's political abuse of psychiatry against political opponents. At an April 1969 lecture, where KGB agents were present, Kuk's remarks on Vedel's incarceration drew support from the intelligentsia, with several intellectuals present (among them Serhii Plachynda, Mykhailo Braichevskyi, Yaroslav Dzyra, Olena Kompan and Ivan Dziuba) applauding the speech. This lecture led to renewed KGB attention on Kuk's academic activities. He published two articles about Vedel in the journal Ukrainian Musicology in 1970, followed by a 24-page brochure providing information about Vedel to educators the next year. Neither Kuk's articles nor the brochure were widely distributed. That same year, Kuk wrote the script to a documentary film on Vedel; the director, Yurii Tkachenko, was subsequently placed under KGB investigation for connections to Soviet dissidents.

From 1969 to 1972, Kuk worked as chief editor of the historiography and source collection division of the Academy of Sciences of Ukraine's Institute of History. During this time, he also contributed to the Ukrainian Soviet Encyclopedia. Kuk's articles for the USE primarily concerned the OUN. In one instance, Kuk became involved in a debate over his efforts to include an article titled "Marxism-Leninism about the Ukrainian national question", including a passage on the difference between Marxist theory and practice. As a result of his writings, he was fired from the Academy of Sciences and barred from holding educational or academic positions on 17 October 1972.

== Final years and death (1991–2007) ==
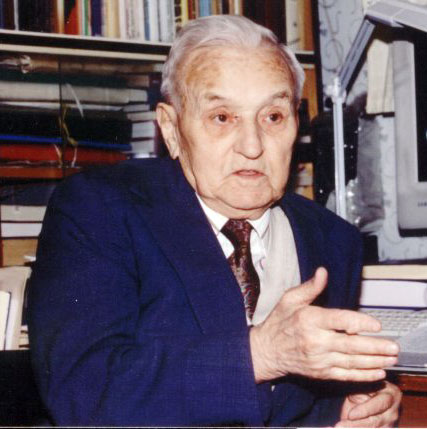
Kuk in January 2007

Kuk supported the 1991 Ukrainian independence referendum. He was interviewed by Ivan Gel in 1992, during which time he expressed reservations about the lack of lustration policies, while expressing support for Leonid Kravchuk's nation-building policies and governing coalition with national democrats. In further writings in the 1990s, Kuk expressed concern with the possibility of renewed Russian imperialism towards Ukraine following the First Chechen War, and, after Vladimir Putin's rise to power and the beginning of the Second Chechen War, condemned the emergence of what he termed a "renewed Russian empire of the most terrible sort". Kuk additionally criticised the government of Leonid Kuchma and prime minister Pavlo Lazarenko for what he perceived as a Russophilic stance towards military affairs.

After independence, Kuk was also involved in commemorations of OUN and UPA members, and he participated in the writing of the Litopys UPA series of books on the UPA. During this time, he lived in a small khrushchyovka on Kyiv's Chudnovsky Street, where he lived in poverty on a monthly pension of 358 Ukrainian hryvnias (US$70.89). Before his death, the Ukrainian government considered burying him in Kyiv's Baikove Cemetery or Lviv's Lychakiv Cemetery, but he refused, expressing his wish to be buried in Krasne, "where I was born, baptised and where I want to be buried".

Kuk died on 9 September 2007, in his apartment in Kyiv. His funeral was held in Kyiv at the Kyiv City Teacher's House before his body was transported to Lviv, where the funeral service continued. Kuk was buried in Krasne.
