= Self-defense Kushch Units =

Units formed to protect Ukrainian villages

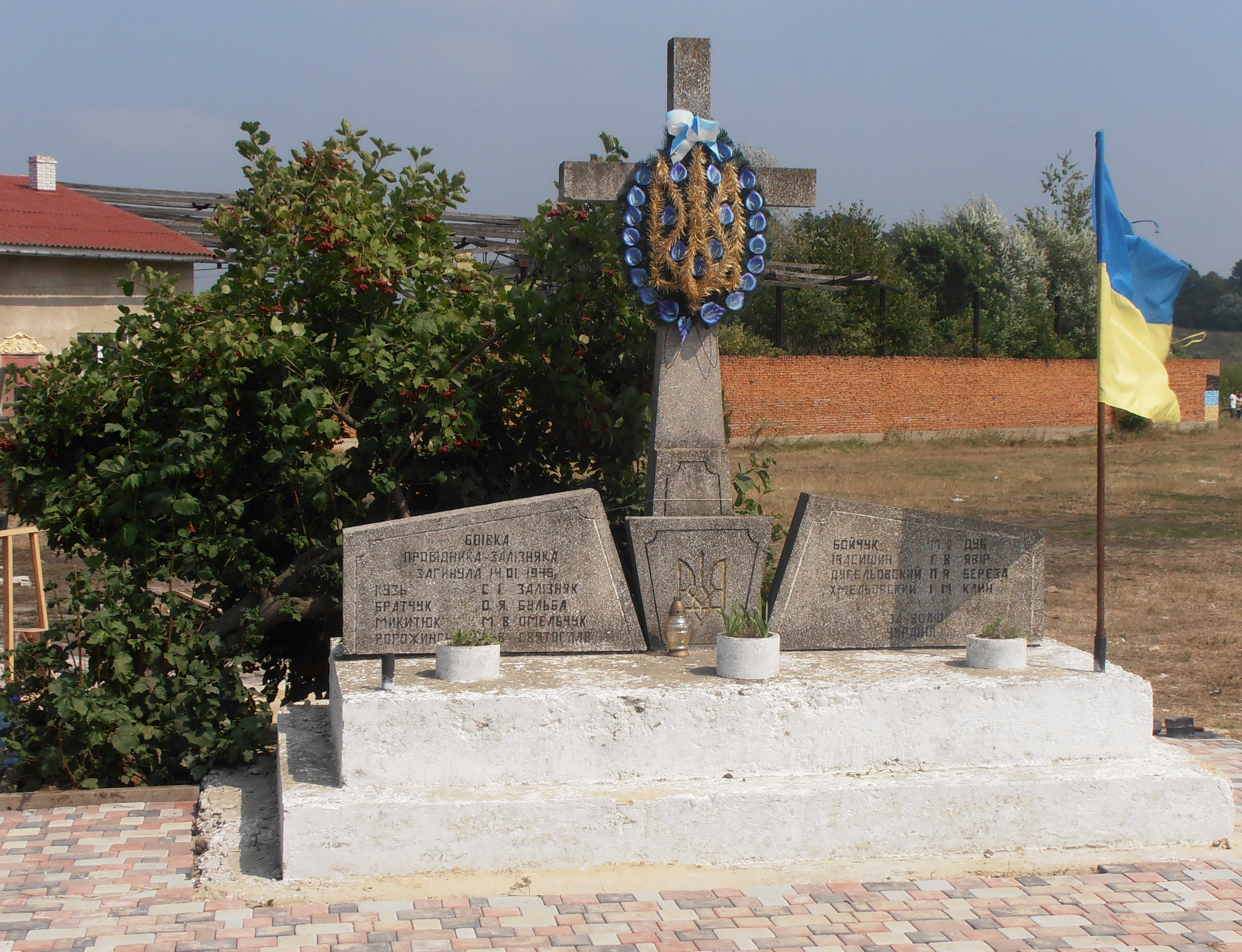
Monument to the fallen SKU fighters in Komariv

The Self-defense Kushch Units (SKU; Ukrainian: Самооборонні Кущові Відділи (СКВ), romanized: Samooboronni Kushchovi Viddily, SKV) were Ukrainian self-defense units formed to protect Ukrainian villages, as well as to create a rear for the UPA. They operated in 1942–1946 and were inspected by the district leaders of the separate formation of OUN-B.

== Name ==
"Kushch" was an administrative unit of Ukrainian Insurgent Army consisting of 5-7 villages.

== Goals ==
Most of their activity was aimed at:

- military training of the population;
- protection of Ukrainian villages and population from Polish and Soviet partisans, as well as gangs of robbers;
- construction of underground bunkers, hospitals and warehouses;
- protection of insurgent warehouses and hospitals;
- accumulation of food, medicine and clothing supplies for UPA units;
- providing transport;
- maintaining communication through liaisons;
- occasional participation in sabotage operations aimed at supporting the attacks of UPA units.

== Structure ==
Self-defense Kushch Units were organized into stanytsas, uniting 1-2 villages, as well as kushchi ("bushes", 5-7 villages). The combat detachments of SKU were based on kushchi, numbering from 30 to 50 soldiers, i. e. 3-4 roji ("swarms"). The command of Kushch units included:

- military officer (kushchovyi) – the head of the kushch
- financial clerk
- propaganda officer
- Sluzhba Bezpeky representative
- representative of the Ukrainian Red Cross organization
- liaison officer

In the structure of the OUN, the term kushch was introduced to replace the terms volost and subdistrict, kushch was subjected to district (and above that – supra-district or povit) organizational and mobilization officers. But SKU members were not obliged to also be members of the OUN.

== SKU activities ==
=== On current Ukrainian territory ===
SKU first appeared in early 1942 in Volhynia and Polissya. In some areas, the so-called "Special Purpose Units" (SPUs) were established, while in others, "Self-Defense Kuschsh Units" (SKUs) were organized. In Volhynia, the organization of this movement was in the hands of Dmytro Klyachkivsky, who on August 30, 1943, ordered the complete mobilization of the Ukrainian population in Volhynia in individual villages. SKU members joined the UPA, but over time, when the units were to be disbanded, partisans were sent to rural self-defense formations. The members of the SKU were distinguished from the UPA units by the fact that they legally lived in the villages located on the territory of the kushch and were united only to carry out a certain action. SKU were managed through the OUN military kushch officers ("kushchovi"). Their weaponry consisted of a small number of firearms, and mainly agricultural and household tools, e.g. axes, pitchforks, scythes, knives. In 1943, SKU departments existed throughout the whole Volhynia region.

=== West of the Yalta Conference border ===
SKU units on the Polish territory defended the Ukrainian populations of "Zakerzonia", or Transcurzonia, i.e. "the land beyond the Curzon Line", or more accurately, the land to the west border approved (with later marginal adjustments) by the final resolution of the 1944 Yalta Conference as the border between Poland and the USSR, which included a substantial Ukrainian minority at the time. The units were active locally Przemyśl (Ukrainian: Peremyshl) foothills, the Beskids, Lublin voivodeship, the Chełm land in particular, which had been a demographically mixed" region, from armed robber groups, at a certain units of the Polish Armia Krajowa and other formations. They attempted tried to prevent deportation to the Ukrainian SSR from Poland in 1944–1946, prevent the forcible removal from the region Operation Vistula in 1947, and protect them against repressions by the Soviet-installed Polish authorities and operatives aligned with them.

== Historical assessment of SKU activities ==
The assessment of the Self-Defense Kushch Units' activities is quite contradictory.

Polish researcher of the Massacres of Poles in Volhynia and Eastern Galicia Ewa Siemaszko believes that due to the small number of firearms SKU could not properly resist the Soviet partisans and the German occupiers, and therefore the OUN was using them to attack Polish settlements, although others contradict this. Grzegorz Motyka, a Polish historian and a board member of the Polish Institute of National Remembrance specializing in Ukrainian topic, believes that the main goal of SKU was to protect Ukrainian villages from attacks.

This is how Yuri Sudyn (born 1933) recalls his older brother Dmytro Sudyn, who was born in 1928 in the village of Stary Lubliniec to the west of the Polish-Ukrainian border, a member of the local SKU "Trembita" (who collaborated with the UPA kurin "Mesnyky"): Since then, my brother has been at home very little. All the time on night raids. Collection and delivery of food supplies for hundreds of UPA, relocation of UPA units and underground leaders in the field, quartering of wounded soldiers in villages, their delivery to military hospitals, and often participation in combat operations conducted by UPA units to protect the population from attacks by Polish bandits, intelligence in the field. This was mainly the work of the self-defense kushch.

== See also ==
- Pavlokoma village tragedy
- Pyskorovychi
- Sahryn Massacre
