= Ukrainian resistance =

Ukrainian resistance may refer to:

- Revolutionary Insurgent Army of Ukraine, during the Ukrainian War of Independence (1917–1921)
- Anti-Soviet resistance by the Ukrainian Insurgent Army, during WWII and after
- Ukrainian resistance during the Russian invasion of Ukraine (2022–)
