= Raid on Stanislav =

- Part of the Anti-Soviet resistance by the Ukrainian Insurgent Army
Date	31 October 1945
Location	Stanislav, Stanislav Oblast, Ukrainian SSR (present-day Ukraine)
Result	Ukrainian victory

Belligerents
Ukrainian Insurgent Army	Soviet Union

Commanders and leaders
Vasyl Andrusyak	Vladimir Zots †

Strength
400	Unknown

Casualties and losses
None	30 killed 20 wounded (Note: Including civilian and friendly fire casualties.); 50 captured

The Raid on Stanislav was conducted by the Ukrainian insurgents against Soviet administration and state security of the city, on 31 October 1945.

== Prelude ==
Soviets launched a number of anti-partisan operations against the Ukrainian Insurgent Army. In October 1945, Soviet propaganda claimed victory over Ukrainian insurgents and an almost complete destruction of UPA. During this time, Ukrainian insurgents organised a raid on the city of Stanyslaviv at the end of October, led by Vasyl Andrusyak.

== Raid ==
The raid begun with insurgent shelling of NKVD department. Insurgents reached the central street and opened fire, attacking their targets and causing panic. The departament commandant, Vladimir Zots, was killed in the initial attack. Lights went out and security services opened fire in response. After making noise in the city, insurgents withdrew without losses while having their escape routes covered by reserve units. Despite insurgents withdrawing from the city, Soviet forces were still exchanging fire throughout the city due to chaos and confusion. The fighting only stopped after 3 hours.

== Aftermath ==
The Soviet side suffered 30 killed and 20 wounded as a result of UPA attack, which included civilians and casualties from friendly fire. UPA reportedly suffered no losses, capturing 50 people in a raid. The attack on Stanislav demonstrated that UPA still existed as an organised force and was capable of challenging Soviet authority. Anti partisan collective punishment operations were carried out in the neighbouring villages. Soviet authorities attempted to downplay this event as an attack organized by "Vlasovites" rather than Ukrainian insurgents they claimed to have almost completely defeated.
