= Anti-Soviet resistance by the Ukrainian Insurgent Army =

Ukrainian nationalist Insurgency against the Soviet Union

- Part of Eastern Front (World War II) and anti-communist insurgencies in Central and Eastern Europe
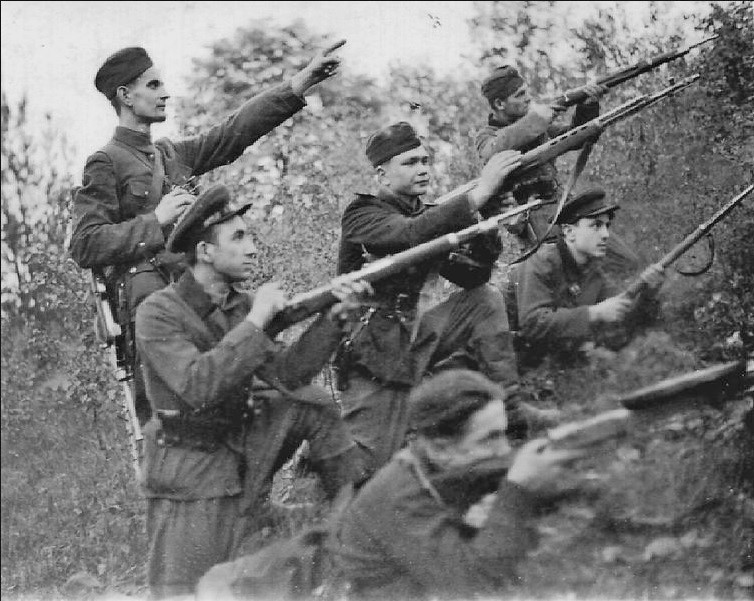
- UPA partisans in 1947
Date	1944–1960
Location	Western Ukraine (Galicia, Volyn, Polissya), Transcarpathia, Northern Bukovina, Podillya, Western Belarus
Result	Soviet victory

Belligerents
Ukrainian Insurgent Army	Soviet Union; Ukrainian SSR

Commanders and leaders
Stepan Bandera X Dmytro Hrytsai (executed); Dmytro Klyachkivsky †; Roman Shukhevych †; Mykola Lebed; Vasyl Sydor †; Vasyl Kuk (POW)	Joseph Stalin; Lavrentiy Beria; Nikita Khrushchev; Vsevolod Merkulov; Viktor Abakumov; Ivan Serov; Nikolai Bulganin; Aleksandr Vasilevsky; Georgy Zhukov; Ivan Konev; Nikolai Vatutin †; Pavel Sudoplatov; Timofei Strokach; Pavlo Meshyk; Lt. Gen. Moskolenko †; Aleksey Dergachev †

Units involved
Self-defense Kushch Units (1944–1946); UPA South (1944–1946); UPA North (1944–1951); UPA West (1944–1949); Sluzhba Bezpeky (1944–1951)	Soviet Armed Forces; Internal troops Soviet partisans (1944); Extermination battalions

Strength
UPA total: 20,000–200,000	Galicia (1944): 500,000+ (Note: Punitive Detachments: 300,000+ Red Army: 200,000)

Casualties and losses
Soviet claim: 153,000 killed 134,000 arrested 203,000 deported Independent estimate: 56,600 killed 98,846 killed 104,990 arrested 48,800 deserted	Soviet claim: 8,340 killed CIA estimate: 35,000 killed Independent estimate: 25,000 killed 9,621 killed 1,343 wounded 2,456 missing 5,635 killed 588 missing 8,612 wounded
- 30,000 Soviet civilians killed

The Ukrainian Insurgent Army (UPA) waged a guerrilla war against the Soviet Union in the western regions of the Ukrainian SSR and southwestern regions of the Byelorussian SSR during and after World War II. With the Red Army’s successful counteroffensive against the Nazi Germany and their invasion into western Ukraine in July 1944, UPA resisted the Red Army's advancement with full-scale guerrilla war, holding up 200,000 Soviet soldiers, particularly in the countryside, and was supplying intelligence to the Nazi Sicherheitsdienst (SD) security service. (Note: OUN-UPA was a terrorist organization, relying on terrorist tactics and collaboration with Nazi Germany that favoured the Organization of Ukrainian Nationalists (OUN) at the expense of more moderate Ukrainian organizations, such as the Ukrainian National Democratic Alliance; not all UPA soldiers were members of the OUN or shared OUN's ideology. UPA was also responsible for the large-scale ethnic cleansing of Poles, such as with the massacres of Poles in Volhynia and Eastern Galicia, the mass murders of Jews, such as the Lviv pogroms (1941), as well as of Ukrainians during the World War II and post-war anti-Soviet terror campaign in western Ukraine.)

One major UPA victory against the Soviet Union was the killing of a high ranking Soviet General Nikolai Vatutin. According to Soviet documents during the conflict, a total of 153,000 people were killed, 134,000 arrested, and 203,000 deported by the Soviet authorities, mostly in the years 1944–1945. At the same time, OUN-UPA killed 30,676 people in the years 1944–1953, and 8,340 of them were soldiers. UHVR claimed that UPA killed 35,000 Soviet state security officers from 1945 to January 1951 and Lt. Gen. Moskolenko in 1948, with CIA covert operations chief Frank Wisner estimating the same figure.

== Background ==
=== Organization of Ukrainian Nationalists ===
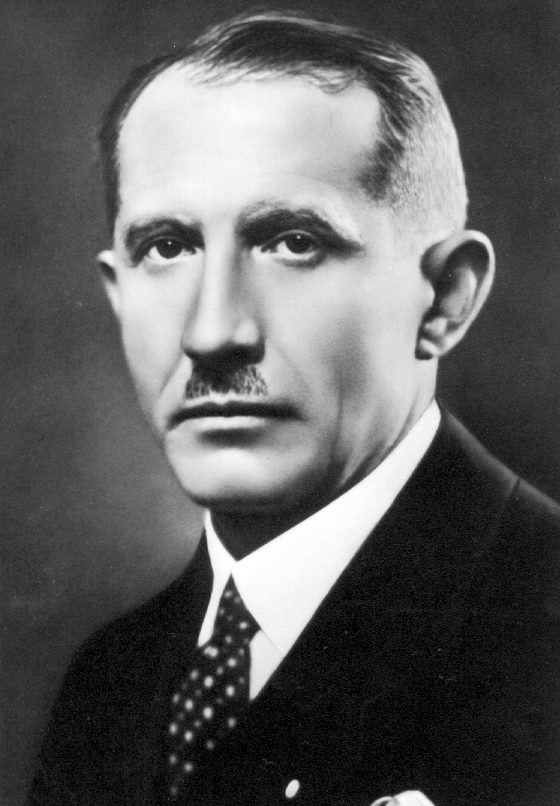
Yevhen Konovalets, the OUN's leader from 1929 to 1938

The Organization of Ukrainian Nationalists (OUN) was established in 1929 by radical nationalists and holding a prominent role fascists, that advocated for an independent, ethnically cleansed, homogenous totalitarian state with all other political parties banned. Prior to World War II, the extreme OUN was smaller and less influential among the minority Ukrainians in Poland than the moderate Ukrainian National Democratic Alliance. The OUN, which emulated the Nazi's organizational system, closely collaborated with other fascist states and movements, particularly in Germany but also in Italy, Japan, Romania, and Spain, many were Nazi agents. Ukrainian nationalism was formed under the influence of such political theorists as Dmytro Dontsov's political thought, characterised by a need for totalitarianism, national chauvinism, and also antisemitism, as well as Mykola Stsiborskyi and Yevhen Onatsky, and Italian fascism and German Nazism. Before the war, the OUN regarded the Second Polish Republic as an immediate target, but even then it viewed the Soviet Union, although not operating on its territory, as the main enemy and greatest oppressor of the Ukrainian people. Even before the war, impressed by the successes of fascism, OUN radicalised its stance, and it saw Nazi Germany as its main ally in the fight for independence.

From the very beginning there was a strong division within the OUN between the young and old groups. The group of older activists was born around 1890 and experienced the service of fighting during World War I and later for Ukrainian independence, they were also active in the Ukrainian Military Organization (UVO), while the younger activists were born later and grew up in independent Poland. The young were much more radical, calling for the use of terror in political struggle, but both groups were united by national radicalism and advocacy of a totalitarian system. The leader of the old group Andriy Melnyk claimed in a letter sent to the German minister of foreign affairs Joachim von Ribbentrop on 2 May 1939 that the OUN was "ideologically akin to similar movements in Europe, especially to National Socialism in Germany and Fascism in Italy".

OUN's terrorist methods, fascination with fascism, rejection of parliamentary democracy and acting against Poland on behalf of Germany did not find support among many other Ukrainian organizations, especially among the Petliurites, i.e. former activists of the Ukrainian People's Republic. In the course of the war, with the approaching defeat of Nazi Germany, the OUN-B changed, at least in official statements, its political image. It moved away from fascist symbolism and totalitarianism toward democratic slogans. OUN's denials of its role in the Holocaust began in 1943 after it became obvious that Germany would lose the war. The whitewashing continued after the war, with OUN's propaganda describing its legacy as a "heroic Ukrainian resistance against the Nazis and the Communists".

=== Outbreak of the war ===
Before 1939, Ukrainian territories were split between Poland, the Soviet Union, Romania, and Czechoslovakia. The invasion of Poland by Nazi Germany on 1 September 1939 was followed by the Soviet invasion on 17 September that captured the eastern provinces (Kresy) of the Second Polish Republic. On 1 November 1939, Polish territories annexed by the Soviet Union (i.e. Volhynia and Eastern Galicia) were incorporated into the Ukrainian Soviet Socialist Republic. Initially, the Soviet occupation was met with limited support from the ethnic Ukrainian population. Repression was directed mainly against the ethnic Poles, and the Ukrainization of education, land reform, and other changes were popular among the Ukrainians. The situation changed in the middle of 1940 when Soviet collectivization began and repressions hit the Ukrainian population. There were 2,779 Ukrainians arrested in 1939, 15,024 in 1940, and 5,500 in 1941, until the German invasion of the Soviet Union.

The situation for ethnic Ukrainians under German occupation was much better. About 550,000 Ukrainians lived in the General Government in German-occupied Poland, and they were favoured at the expense of Poles. Approximately 20 thousand Ukrainian activists escaped from the Soviet occupation to Warsaw or Kraków. In late 1939, Nazi Germany accommodated OUN leaders in the city of Kraków, the capital of the General Government and provided a financial support for the OUN. The headquarters of the Ukrainian Central Committee headed by Volodymyr Kubijovyč, the legal representation of the Ukrainian community in the Nazi zone, were also located in Kraków.

=== Creation of OUN-B, pogroms, and anti-Soviet uprising ===
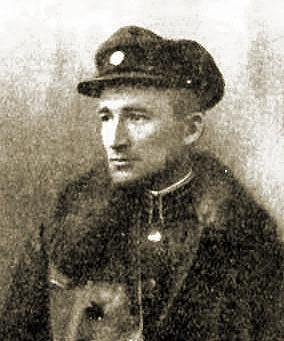
Andriy Melnyk of the OUN-M

On 10 February 1940 in Kraków, a revolutionary faction of the OUN emerged, called the OUN-R or, after its leader Stepan Bandera, the OUN-B (Banderites). This was opposed by the current leadership of the organization, so it split, and the old group was called OUN-M after the leader Andriy Melnyk (Melnykites). The OUN-M dominated Ukrainian emigration and the Bukovina; in Ukraine itself, the Banderists gained a decisive advantage (60% of the agent network in Volhynia and 80% in Eastern Galicia).

The OUN-B was more radical and already in 1940 began preparations for an anti-Soviet uprising. However, Soviet repression delayed these plans and more serious fighting did not occur until after the German invasion of the USSR in July 1941. According to OUN-B reports, they then had about 20,000 men grouped in 3,300 locations in Western Ukraine. In addition, Ukrainian Nachtigall and Roland battalions were formed under German command and numbered about 800 men. The NKVD was determined to liquidate the Ukrainian underground, according to Soviet reports 4435 members were arrested between October 1939 and December 1940. There were public trials and death sentences were carried out. In the first half of 1941, 3073 families (11329 people) of members of the Polish and Ukrainian underground were deported from Eastern Galicia and Volhynia. Soviet repression forced about a thousand members of the Ukrainian underground to take up partisan activities even before the German invasion.

The OUN seized about 213 villages and organized diversion in the rear of the Red Army. In the process, it lost 2,100 soldiers and 900 were wounded. OUN's anti-Semitism was influenced by Nazi Germany but the organization also had its own, independent anti-Semitic tradition. The OUN-B formed Ukrainian People's Militsiya that, displaying exceptional cruelty, carried out at least 58 documented antisemitic pogroms and massacres of Jews that claimed between 13,000 and 35,000 lives. The biggest pogroms carried out by the Ukrainian nationalists took place in Lviv resulting in the massacre of 6,000 Jews. The involvement of OUN-B is unclear but certainly OUN-B propaganda fuelled antisemitism. The vast majority of pogroms carried out by the Banderites occurred in Eastern Galicia and Volhynia. After the German capture of Lviv in 1941, the OUN leadership declared the Act of restoration of the Ukrainian state; however, Adolf Hitler was opposed to Ukrainian statehood, having set his sights on the ruthless economic exploitation of the newly acquired territories. OUN was banned, Bandera was arrested on July 5 and placed under house arrest in Berlin. The OUN-B went underground and encouraged its members and supporters to join the German administration and especially the auxiliary police.

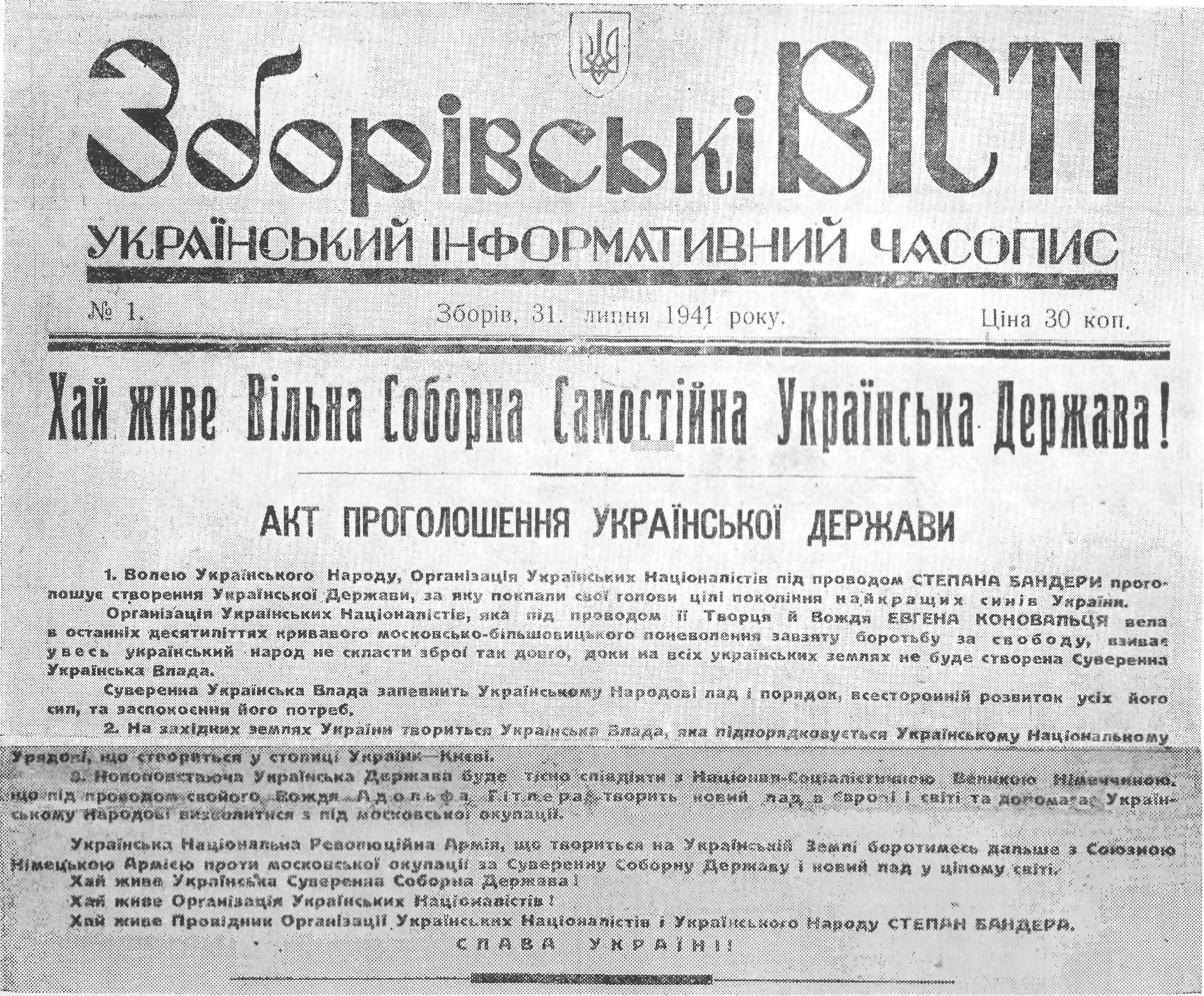
The Declaration of the Ukrainian State on 30 June 1941

Following the German army, they managed to extend their network into eastern Ukraine; their slogans did not find support among the local population. The OUN-M on the other hand acted openly and took over local governments in western Ukraine, including Lviv. OUN-B fought OUN-M, going so far as to murder its members. In late 1941 and early 1942, the Germans started to fight the influence of OUN-M by arresting its members, so they also went underground. Another group was the so-called Polissian Sich formed by Taras Bulba Borovets, who referred to the traditions of the Ukrainian People's Republic. After the German attack he occupied and controlled Sarny and Olevsk, formed an alliance with the Germans and fought the Soviet remnants as police chief. In November 1941, he was forced to disband his unit (which at that time numbered about 2,000–3,000 people) after the Germans wanted to limit his independence and he refused to participate in the liquidation of the Jews. Even after that, the power of the occupation administration over the territory of Polesia was mostly limited to cities, railway stations, and roads. The countryside turned into an arena of brutal confrontation between several guerrillas armies.

Mass executions of Jews began in the autumn of 1941 on German-occupied territories and continued in the second half of 1942 when the Germans began liquidating Jewish ghettos. Some Ukrainian auxiliary policemen took part in these executions. From 1942, the local non-Jewish population also became targets of repression. The Germans began to deport the population en masse to the Reich for forced labour and to demand large supplies from the farmers. For their refusal, the Germans began to punish the population with executions and pacifications of Ukrainian and Polish villages. The Ukrainian auxiliary police also took part in the pacification actions, but the mood of rebellion was growing in their ranks. As a result, partisan units reappeared in Western Ukraine, including Soviet ones and the first Ukrainian Insurgent Army (UPA) formed by Taras Bulba-Borovets. Bulba-Borovets went into active combat in April 1942, mainly against the Germans; the group entered into a neutrality agreement with the Soviet partisans. In December 1942, he proposed to the Melnykites and Banderites to join forces with him as commander-in-chief. The OUN-B rejected the proposal, but the OUN-M, who had already begun to form their own units, accepted the offer.

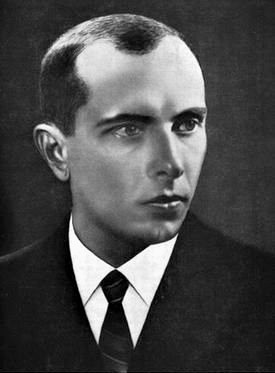
Stepan Bandera, leader of the OUN-B

=== Creation of UPA, anti-German uprising, and extermination of Poles ===
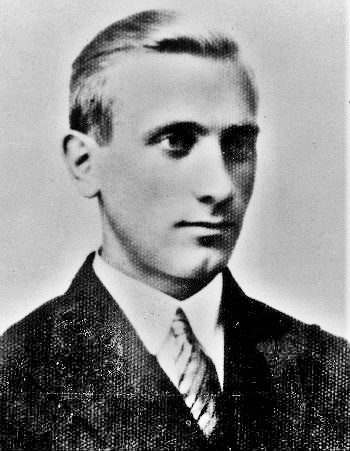
Dmytro Klyachkivsky, the first head-commander of the UPA-North

In October 1942 OUN-B decided to form its own partisans, called OUN Military Detachments. Individual units entered active combat in February 1943 (first was sotnia of Hryhoriy Perehinyak attack on German police station in Volodymyrets on 7 February). At the third OUN-B conference (17-23 February 1943) it was decided to launch an anti-German uprising in order to liberate as much territory as possible before the arrival of the Red Army. The uprising was to break out first in Volhynia, for which purpose the formation of a partisan army called the Ukrainian Liberation Army began there. The uprising broke out in mid-March, with Dmytro Klyachkivsky and Vasyl Ivakhiv leading it, and Klyachkivsky alone after Ivakhiv death in May that year. It was also at that time that the name given to it was abandoned and the name Ukrainian Insurgent Army, taken over from Bulba-Borovets, began to be used, thus impersonating it. The new army basis were Ukrainian policemen, who deserted en masse (about 5 000) between March and April 1943. By July 1943, the UPA had 20,000 soldiers. Even before the anti-German uprising started, OUN-B units started to attack Polish villages and murder Poles. This soon turned into a full-scale extermination campaign, aimed at killing off or driving out the Polish population from areas considered by OUN-B to be Ukrainian. The main target of UPA's ethnic cleansing were Poles, mainly women and children, but they also killed other ethnic minorities such as Jews, Czechs, Hungarians, Armenians, and even many Ukrainians. UPA fighters used mainly farm tools such as scythes, knives and pitchforks to commit their murders of civilians.

Attacks on Poles were the reason why Taras Bulba-Borowets rejected the proposal of cooperation and he also criticised the idea of a premature uprising against the Germans. To distinguish himself from the OUN-B army, he adopted the name Ukrainian National Revolutionary Army (UNRA). The maximum number of UNRA soldiers was approximately 3,000–4,000. Most OUN-M units had no such resistance and joined the UPA. Those that resisted as well as the UNRA and Ukrainian Revolutionary Front units were mostly broken up or forcibly forced to cooperate in the summer of 1943. In July–August 1943, the UPA ruled over a large territory of Volhynia, cleared of Germans and Polish population. OUN-B units in eastern Galicia, bearing the name Ukrainian National Self-Defence (UNS) joined the fight later, only in the late summer of 1943, and only in a limited capacity. From January 1944, the incorporation of UNS units in Eastern Galicia into the UPA began. This also became the beginning of the extermination of Polish people in Eastern Galicia, which started in April of that year.

At the Third Congress of the OUN (21–25 August 1943) it was decided to make preparations for an open fight against the Red Army, with plans to extend it to other parts of the Soviet Union, involving other oppressed nations. Decisions were also taken to move away from extreme nationalist rhetoric and adopt a more pro-democratic one. It was also around that time when acting OUN leader Mykola Lebed was replaced with a three-person Provid Office in which Roman Shukhevych played a major role. Shukhevych also soon assumed the role of UPA commander-in-chief in place of Klyachkivsky. With gradual German withdrawal from western Ukraine, UPA started to strike German rear units capturing their equipment. These actions provoked the German raids on UPA positions. By the end of July 1944, the Ukrainian Supreme Liberation Council, an OUN-B outfit, reached a signed agreement with the Germans for a unified front against the Soviet Union and for UPA diversionary activities in the rear of the Soviet front. The signed deal ended UPA raids on the German rear positions and opened door to the flow of arms and training materials from the Germans. UPA-German cooperation ended in early 1945 when it ceased to be beneficial to the OUN-B.

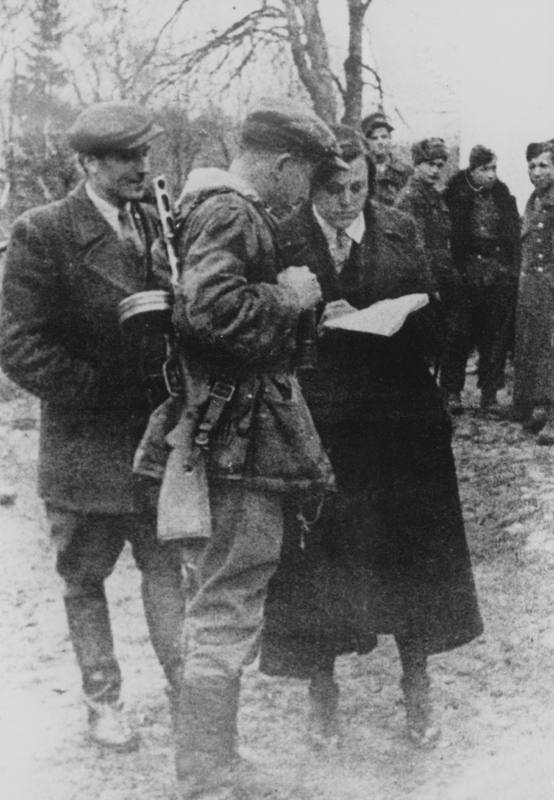
Clockwise are Roman Shukhevych, Dmytro Hrytsai and Catherine Miéchko-Lagouch in November 1943, shortly before the penultimate phase of massacres of Poles in Volhynia and Eastern Galicia

In 1944 UPA reached a peak membership of 25–30,000 guerrillas. Together with the militias of the Sluzhba Bezpeky, Self-defense Kushch Units and the field network of agents, the number of people linked to the underground reached about 100,000 people. In April 1943, the Germans began forming the Ukrainian SS "Galicia" division. The OUN-B leadership was initially negative to the idea but later began to support the enlistment of members in the formation as a good opportunity to receive military training. The division was broken up in June 1944, only 3,000 soldiers managed to avoid death or capture, and several hundred of them joined the UPA. The OUN leadership and the UPA command were convinced that the Russians were prepared to destroy all Ukrainians, basing this on the experience of the Holodomor, which is seen as a Soviet genocide of Ukrainians by numerous countries. At the beginning of 1944, the Red Army came to the areas of UPA's activity. In January–February 1944, it occupied a large part of Volhynia. The troops of the 1st Ukrainian Front, with the forces of the 13th and 60th armies, carried out the Rivne-Lutsk offensive, capturing these two regional centers on February 2. In the occupied territories, the Soviet authorities seized food, conscripted local Ukrainians en masse into the Red Army, and after a few days of training threw them on the front. The majority of party and state cadres were foreigners from the USSR, who often behaved like conquerors in a conquered country, and treated the local Ukrainian population with contempt. There were also numerous examples of fraud, theft, and rape committed by Soviet soldiers.^{:10}

== Armed resistance during the war (1944–1945) ==
=== Fights in Volhynia and Podolia (first half of 1944) ===
The UPA tried to undermine Soviet authorities and block the mobilisation of the local population into Soviet units. They attacked recruitment committees and conducted agitation among the local population. They changed their tactics in September 1944, when they encouraged some of their followers to join the army in order to disintegrate it from within and propagate nationalist content. This effort was quite successful, as, by September 1, 1944, the 1st Ukrainian Front had only managed to call up 56% of desired recruits.

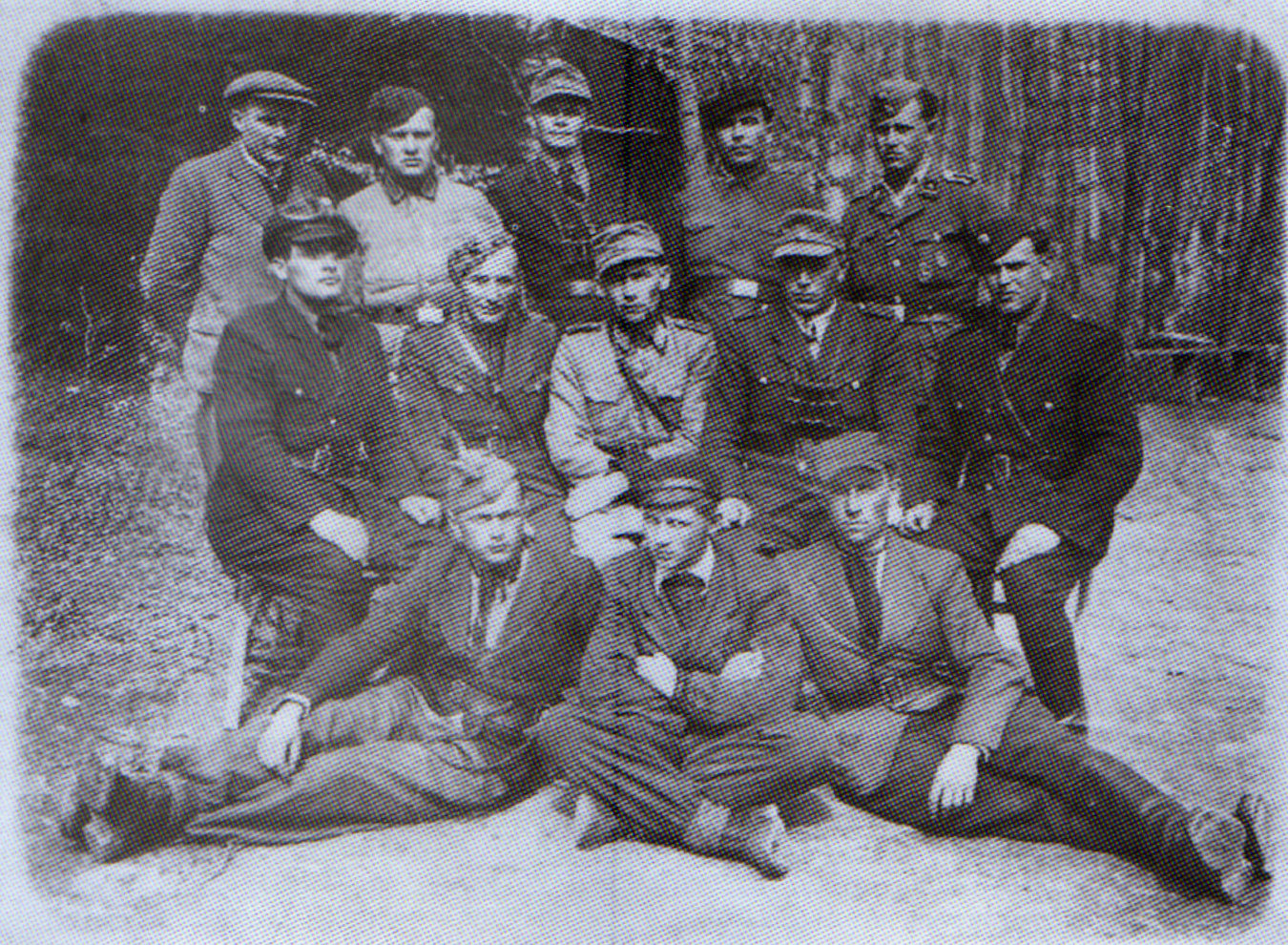
UPA officers

The majority of the UPA guerrillas viewed Stepan Bandera as their leader. Apart from general recruits, the UPA's ranks included Ukrainians from the former 14th Waffen Grenadier Division of the SS (1st Galician), German SS men—including a German SS officer Anton Eichner—and Slovak Hlinka Guards. The approach of the Red Army forced UPA's to develop further strategy and tactics of war with occupiers. The UPA South group was ordered to leave the Vinnytsia and Kamianets-Podilskyi regions, where there were few forests, and retreat to Volhynia together with two parts of the UPA East army group. In the second half of January 1944, units of the UPA crossed the front in the Volhynia forest belt along with the Sluch and Horyn rivers.

On 12 February 1944, the first appeal of the Soviet leadership to the UPA was published, calling for them to voluntarily come out of the underground and lay down their arms. Persons suspected of aiding the underground were deported to the east of the USSR. The bodies of those killed were often put on display to intimidate others. For the same purpose, open trials and public executions of captured members of the OUN-B and UPA were organized, to which even schoolchildren were expelled.

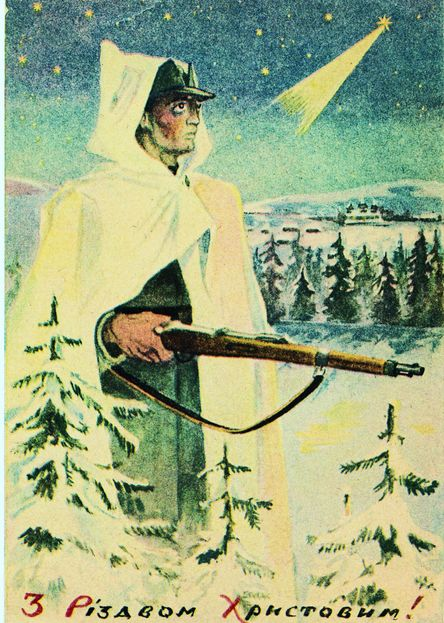
Christmas card made and distributed by the UPA 1945

On 29 February 1944, a UPA detachment attacked a Soviet convoy as it left the headquarters of the Thirteenth Army, mortally wounding 1st Ukrainian Front commander Mykola Vatutin. According to the most common version, near the village of Mylyatyn in the Ostroh district, a column was fired upon by a UPA detachment under the command of Petro "Aeneas" Oliynyk. The Soviet government responded to Vatutin's assassination just as harshly. The 1st Ukrainian Front allocated one cavalry division, reinforced by 20 armoured vehicles and eight tanks to fight the insurgents in March of that year. A battalion garrison was stationed in each district, and NKVD Internal Troops regiments were stationed in regional centers. In total, more than 30,000 NKVD soldiers were sent to fight the UPA. Some units arrived in Ukraine directly from Chechnya and Kalmykia, where deportations had just ended. In some villages, subordinate NKVD Destruction battalions were created. Ten armoured trains supported by amphibious groups arrived to protect the railways.

In March 1944, the Soviets recorded 270 attacks on Red Army soldiers. In April 1944, the insurgents' actions changed dramatically. The troops of the First Ukrainian Front were preparing for an offensive against the Nazi invaders. This did not suit the OUN leadership, and it ordered a series of deep raids on the rear of the Red Army. In the areas north of the Kovel-Rivne-Shepetivka railway line, open-armed clashes took place, during which UPA units suffered significant losses. On 28 March 1944, Nikita Khrushchev was told that 1,129 OUN and UPA members had been killed in 65 operations, and by April 7, that number had risen to 2,600 killed and 3,256 taken prisoner. The actual losses amounted to 112 killed and 90 wounded.

The biggest battle of the UPA with regular Soviet troops took place on 21–28 April 1944 in the Kremenets forests near the village Gurby. The Soviets engaged about 15,000 troops against more than 4,000 UPA partisans concentrated there. Both sides considered themselves the winners of this skirmish. According to Soviet reports, they killed 2,018 people and arrested 1,570, they also seized large quantities of weapons and food warehouses, losing only eleven dead and 46 wounded. By contrast, according to UPA reports, they lost only 136 dead and 75 wounded, while they killed between 120 and 900 Soviets. The battle cleared the region of partisans, but the UPA units were not broken.

According to Soviet data, in the first half of 1944, the NKVD killed 16,338 insurgents and captured 15,99, and appeared with 2549 convicts. Also, 3,676 members of the OUN underground and the UPA were arrested. In addition, 27,361 people who had evaded conscription were detained. The casualties among the NKVD personnel were as follows. Killed: 37 NKVD officers, 655 officers and soldiers of the NKVD and Red Army troops, and 112 missing. As of 1 July 1944, 80 active UPA detachments with 6,749 participants were active on the front line (which included the western regions of the Ukrainian SSR captured by the Red Army).

=== After German expulsion from Ukraine ===
In July 1944, during an operation to seize western Ukraine, Soviet troops surrounded and defeated eight German divisions of about 60,000 near Brody. Among them were 10,000 soldiers of the SS Galicia division. About 5,000 managed to escape from the encirclement, but many were killed, wounded, or taken prisoner. An estimated 3,000 escaped captivity, many of whom later joined the rebels. At the end of the Lviv-Sandomierz offensive, almost all of Galicia was already in the hands of Soviet troops. The Red Army occupied Lviv, Stanislav, and Przemyśl on 27 July, and Drohobych and Boryslav on 6 August. Thus, the Germans lost almost all of Ukraine, except for the mountain range and Transcarpathia. At that time, only a small part of the UPA was on the German side of the front, in the Carpathians.

In August 1944, after the Red Army entered Hungary, Romania, and Poland, the active actions of the UPA resumed. In addition to ambushes on highways, shelling and killing individual servicemen, attacks on military depots, and sabotage of communications, the OUN-UPA's actions also aimed to disrupt food supplies to the Red Army. Some military units were also attacked. On 18 August 1944, the 1st Communications Battalion of the 1331st Rifle Regiment, which was marching to the front, was ambushed on the road near Pidhaitsi in the Ternopil region. Most of the soldiers and officers were killed, only 11 survived.

Anti-insurgency operations continued in the summer of 1944. On 30 July 1944, military groups of 207 and 208 separate infantry battalions discovered and destroyed the UPA-North headquarters headed by Chief of Staff Leonid Stupnytsky while combing the Dermansky Forest in the Rivne region. As a result of the battle, 70 (mostly the leadership and their guards) were killed and 73 insurgents were captured. In August 1944, 220 military operations were conducted in the Lviv region alone, as a result of which more than 5,000 members of the OUN-UPA were killed. During the Soviet operation of the NKVD and the Fourth Ukrainian Front in the Drohobych area from 18 August to 9 September, 1,171 were killed and 1,180 Banderites were taken prisoner, while 6,000 people who evaded mobilization were detained. Between 10 January and 23 February 1945, about 26,000 insurgents were captured and 11,000 killed.

In the autumn of 1944, the issue of coordinating the actions of Melnyk's armed formations and UPA detachments were finally resolved. "Melnykites" were stationed in the north-western regions of Volhynia and the Carpathians, cooperating with Ukrainian People's Revolutionary Army (UNRA) units and the Germans. The OUN-M divisions in the Carpathian region were headed by S. Kasyan ("Korop"), and the general command was headed by Ivan Kedyulych ("Chubchyk"). During the crossing of the fronts through the Carpathians Melnykites received a proposal from the UPA to unite troops. With the sanction of the commander of the OUN-M armed forces, General Kapustyansky, such a merger took place, and Ivan Kedyulych was included in the main military headquarters. At the end of summer 1944, auxiliary detachments of the NKVD (Destruction battalions) were actively formed. By November, 203 fighter battalions (27,796 fighters) and 2,997 support groups (27,385 members) had been formed. By the end of 1944, there were 212 fighter battalions with 23,906 fighters and 2,336 support groups with 24,025 members in the western regions of Ukraine.

On 9 October 1944, the NKVD and the NKDB of the USSR issued an order "On measures to combat the OUN underground and eliminate OUN armed gangs in the western regions of the USSR." According to him, the western regions of the USSR were divided into two zones of responsibility: Lviv, Stanislav, Drohobych, and Chernivtsi regions were engaged in the People's Commissar of the NKVD Vasyl Ryasny and the NKDB Serhiy Savchenko, and the head of the border troops of the Ukrainian district Petro Burmak; Rivne, Volyn, and Ternopil regions were managed by Deputy People's Commissars Strokach and Danylo Yesypenko, and the head of the NKVD of the Ukrainian District Mykhailo Marchenkov.

According to the NKVD, from February to 31 December 1944, 6,495 operations were conducted in Western Ukraine, in which 57,405 insurgents were killed. In addition, 4,744 families (13,320 people) of UPA members and people who had helped them were expelled from the USSR. As a result of operations were seized: one U-2 aircraft, one armoured vehicle and one armoured personnel carrier, 35 guns, 323 mortars, 321 machine guns and 2,588 machine guns, 211 PTR, 18,600 rifles, 4,200 submachine guns, and other weapons and equipment including 135 walkie-talkies and 18 printing presses. The losses of the Soviet side during the same period killed and hanged - during operations and relevant actions of the UPA were: NKVD-NKGB – 221 (37 missing or captured), officers of the NKVD and the Red Army – 157 (31), soldiers and sergeants – 1,880 (402) and 904 (127), local residents – 1 953 (248), and fighters of fighter battalions – 40 (230). A total of 2,903 "gang manifestations" by the OUN-UPA were recorded.

==== Battle of Zaliznytsia (28 April 1944) ====
On 28 April 1944, the 19th Brigade of the Internal Troops of the NKVD began another clearing of the Kremenets forests. By the end of the day, without meeting the enemy, it reached the river Sluch. On 29 April at 5 a.m., there were shots from the village of Zaliznytsia, where 18 Red Army soldiers of the 70th Army had been ambushed by the "Doxa" UPA troops of Semyon Kotyk. At 6:15 a.m., the NKVD company went to the outskirts of the village, where it was stopped by heavy UPA fire. The guerrillas not only detained the NKVD but soon launched a counterattack. The Soviets found themselves in a difficult situation. At 7:40 am, 155 NKVD officers, led by the commander of the 19th Brigade, Colonel Timofeev, arrived in support. Seeing this, the guerrillas retreated. The NKVD pursues, which lasted through the evening into the next day. Around 19:30, the Soviets reached the village of Gronne (now Hvizdiv) and attacked the guerrillas stationed in the village. According to the NKVD, many guerrillas were killed in the night battle: 225 killed, 15 wounded and 106 arrested. Most of them were probably civilians. The Soviets also suffered heavy casualties: 23 were killed, including two officers, 30 wounded, five of them officers, and two went missing, including one officer. The UPA estimated Soviet losses 240 killed.

==== Battle of Piryatin (19 August 1944) ====
After the battle near Yazheva Gora (16 August 1944) near Maheriv, the "Siromantsi" UPA under the command of Poltava-born Dmytro Karpenko "Yastrub" withdrew to the northeast, to the forest between Pyriatyn (Lviv Raion) and Prystannia (Chervonohrad Raion). In Pyriatyn, Siromantsi met with the newly formed "Zavoyovnyky" UPA sotnis, which apparently came under Yastrub's command as a newly appointed commander of the tactical unit, on the Lviv-Velyki Mosty road and the Bug River. The day before, the Mageriv regional department of the NKVD had received intelligence about the presence of three sotnia UPAs near Pyriatyn, armed with light weapons, mortars, anti-aircraft guns and machine guns. There were also Sluzhba Bezpeky with the officer "Gayem" (Dmytro Dumych) and the Self-defense Local Departments. About 700 people total in all formations took part in the Battle of Pyriatyn. According to the Chronicle of "Siromantsi" sotnia, the enemy lost 80 killed and 62 wounded, and the rebels lost four killed and two wounded. Trophies won: Maxim machine gun, three Degtyarov machine guns, several submachine guns, and rifles. The weapons were given to the newly organized hundred. Some of the recruits of the "Marny" and "Yarema" came from the surrounding villages and after the battle went home. The remaining sotnia joined the "Galaida" kurin, which on August 22 near Zubeyky (Lviv Raion) fought a major defensive battle with a battalion of the 83rd Regiment of the NKVD Border Troops and the 50th Motorcycle Regiment of the Red Army. Local historian and writer Ivan Gubka claims in his artistic and documentary works that 18 insurgents were killed in the battle of Pyriatyn: 11 from the SLE and seven from the "Siromantsi" sotnia.

==== Battle of Karov (29–30 August 1944) ====
On 27 August 1944, Soviet intelligence learned that a strong 1,400-strong UPA group was operating in the woods near Kariv-Piddubtsi. The 3rd Battalion of the 2nd Regiment (250 men, Commander Major Korzhenko), separate groups of soldiers of the 88th and 104th Border Troops Divisions (450 border guards in total), and four squadrons of the 29th Guards Regiment were assigned to the operation against the insurgents. The infantry was supported, including an artillery battery and an 82-mm mortar battery. At dawn on 29 August, Soviet troops surrounded the forest, taking up positions to attack. The NKVD were opposed by the "Galaida" kurin under the command of Dmytro Pelyp, which consisted of three sotnia. At 5:30 a.m., the guerrillas were warned by the surrounding residents fleeing the surrounding villages. This allowed them to take up defensive positions in advance.

On 29 August at 7 a.m., an intense one-and-a-half-hour artillery shelling with cannons, mortars and Katyushas began, which did not however inflict losses on the insurgents. Therefore, the enemy launched an offensive from the east, where there was the "Galaida 2" sotnia. Soon the direction of the main strike was transferred to the center of the insurgent positions, which were occupied by the "Galaida 1" sotnia and the Self-defense Local Departments. At about 7 p.m., Soviet troops received reinforcements in seven vehicles and began a new offensive. This blow finally broke the line of defense of the UPA, but at dusk the Soviet troops stopped the offensive. Taking the opportunity, the soldiers broke into small groups and broke through the Soviet lines. In the morning the offensive resumed, but only small groups of soldiers remained, which were killed. The Soviets estimated the UPA's losses at 625 killed. They themselves had 32 killed and 48 wounded, and one soldier missing. According to the UPA, ten guerrillas were killed and twelve wounded. Two UPA fighters were taken prisoner. They estimated Soviet losses at about 300 killed and 200 wounded.

==== Battle of Urman village (17 September 1944) ====
On 17 September 1944, the 187th Battalion of the NKVD (without the first company) conducted an operation north of Berezhany. The 3rd Company came across a 60-strong UPA detachment and pursued it. Reaching Urmani, the NKVD unexpectedly attacked a strong UPA group (according to the Soviets, numbered up to 800 partisans). The 3rd Company of 35 soldiers was quickly surrounded, cut off from the rest of the battalion. The battle lasted 11 hours, then at dusk the guerrillas retreated to Brzezany. Casualty estimates of this encounter differ. According to the NKVD, the UPA lost 300 men and convoys of weapons and ammunition, while NKVD had 12 killed, 18 wounded, and two missing.^{:494}According to a UPA report, the NKVD lost 97 people killed and three grenade launchers, as well as other weapons and ammunition.

==== Battle of Univ (30 September–1 October 1944) ====
The largest battle in the area between the internal troops of the NKVD and the UPA-West forces of the "Lysonya" military district, which took place from 30 September to 1 October 1944, near the Univ Lavra monastery. At the end of September 1944, the NKVD command received information that a strong UPA unit was stationed eight kilometers northeast of Peremyshliany. To eliminate it from the area they sent units of the 17th Brigade, numbering about 450 people, under the command of Lieutenant Colonel SG Bromberg. The UPA unit under Dmytro Karpenko ("Yastrub") was stationed in this area. Ukrainian insurgent intelligence, in turn, also reported a concentration of Soviet troops but believed it was simply combing the village. The battle took place on September 30, 1944, near the Univ Lavra monastery. On the part of the UPA, the battle took place in the Siromantsiv hut, Volodymyr Zobkiv's Hundred Self-Defense Hundred, Kosy, and the Dovbny Hundred. The Ukrainian insurgents were opposed by seventeen brigades of NKVD internal troops, numbering up to 1,500 soldiers. Soviet troops used heavy weapons, including reconnaissance tanks. From 9 a.m. to 11 p.m., NKVD troops, supported by guns, mortars, and tanks, made 22 attacks, which were repulsed by Ukrainian insurgents. UPA fighters counterattacked several times. At night, despite the encirclement, the UPA, divided into small groups, began a breakthrough from the "kettle" in the direction of Pnyatyn. NKVD troops sent a group of 50 men in pursuit of the rebels with the support of four tanks. Soviet troops caught up with the guerrillas in Pniatyn when they stopped there to rest. Tanks fired on UPA positions, inflicting additional heavy losses on the insurgents. According to Ukrainian sources, the attack of the NKVD internal troops was stopped by Dmytro Karpenko, "Yastrub" personally damaged one of the tanks with an anti-tank gun. According to Soviet data, Ukrainian guerrillas lost 165 killed and 15 taken prisoner. The NKVD had six killed and 32 wounded. The NKVD seized two anti-tank guns, five machine guns, and 31 rifles. The UPA acknowledged the loss of 17 killed and 25 wounded near Univ, seven killed and eight wounded in Pniatyn. According to their estimates, the NKVD troops had 170 killed and 120 wounded or even 303 killed.

==== Battle of Leszczawa Górna (28 October 1944) ====
The largest battle of the UPA with NKVD units in modern Poland occurred on the 28th of October near Leszczawa Górna. In the late summer of 1944, anticipating the arrival of the front, the UPA units of the General Government retreated to the higher reaches of the Eastern Carpathians. After the front had passed in September 1944, the sotnias "Choma" (NN) and "Czornoho" (NN) of the Czarnola UPA unit "Smertonosci", commanded by "Kulia", returned to the Przemyśl foothills, specifically to the Turnica area. 7 Ukrainian paratroopers dropped by the Germans and mobilised SKW members reinforced them in October. Passing through Jamna and Grąziowa, the Sotnias entered the area of Trzcianiec and Leszczawa Górna on 18 October, finally reaching Leszczawa Górna on 20 October. During this time, strong NKVD units operated behind the front lines. At 5 a.m. on 28 October 1944, an NKVD unit of 300 soldiers launched an attack on the 500 or so UPA soldiers armed with 70–80 machine guns. More NKVD reinforcements arrived during the 15-hour battle, bringing the total to 800 soldiers supported by armoured vehicles. A further 300 soldiers joined in at midday, after which the Soviet troops withdrew. The UPA unit suffered losses, with 17 dead (including Soten "Choma"), 8 wounded, 3 dying of wounds, and 3 burned alive. Sotny "Chrin" participated, destroying an armored car but sustaining severe hand injuries. Reportedly, the NKVD unit suffered significant losses, with 207 reported killed (including 1 general and senior officers), 2 armored cars burned, 13 military trucks destroyed, and a limousine carrying the mentioned general also destroyed. Post-battle, some UPA units disbanded, merging with SKW units, while others returned to the Eastern Carpathians in the area of the "Czorny Lis" Tactical Section.

==== Impeding mobilization of Ukrainians to the Red Army ====
Entering the territory of Western Ukraine, the Soviet command launched mass conscription into the Red Army. The Kremlin's mobilization policy in the region had the dual aim of replenishing Soviet numbers and preventing the UPA from doing the same; that is, undermining the social base of the UPA. From the beginning of 1944 to 25 April, the active army was replenished by about 170,000 inhabitants of the Rivne, Volyn, and Ternopil regions. By 23 September, 33,745 Ukrainians and 13,701 Poles had been mobilized in Lviv Oblast, 105,761 and 30,072 in Ternopil Oblast, 25,004 and 9,197 in Drohobych Oblast, 50,784 and 8,447 in Stanislavsk Oblast, 79,472 and 3,067 in Volyn Oblast, and 98,693 and 5,262 in Rivne Oblast, Chernivtsi – 59,561 and 2,145, and a total of 524,898 people, including 453,020 Ukrainians and 71,878 Poles.

Soviet mobilization in the region faced enormous problems. The OUN leadership and the UPA command ordered their propaganda departments and combat groups to oppose mobilization attempts in every possible way. To do this, they recommended falsifying or destroying conscription letters, boycotting received calls to military registration and enlistment office, and military actions to return the conscripted. Another way to counter mobilization was to call people to guerrilla war shortly before the day they were due to show up at the military enlistment office. According to the instructions received, UPA units often entered the villages and forbade people to join the Red Army at public meetings.

The boycott of mobilization in the RSCA bore fruit. For example, in April 1944 in the Rivne region, out of 69,110 people subject to mobilization, only 2,620 appeared on the agenda of the military registration and enlistment offices. The exception was the cities, where most of those called did respond to the call. By 1 September 1944, the mobilization goals of the 1st Ukrainian Front were only 56% met. The guerrillas carried out attacks aimed at preventing mobilization:

- On the night of 6–7 March 1944, the soldiers attacked the Rivne military enlistment office. The building burned down.
- On 11 August 1944, 405 mobilized recruits left Stanislav for Stryi under the protection of four Red Army soldiers. Near the village of Vista in the Kalush region (24 km from Stanislavov), the convoy was ambushed. Taking advantage of the confusion, 166 recruits fled into the woods.
- By 29 August 1944, there had been as many as six attacks on recruits in the Stanislavshchyna.
- On 23 August 1944, in the area of the village of Chervone, Berezhany district, guerrillas attacked a column of 850 recruits accompanied by 80 soldiers. Seven were killed in action, and six Red Army soldiers were wounded. Eight recruits were also killed and 12 were injured. According to Soviet sources, the soldiers lost eighteen men.

==== Attacks on cities in 1944 ====
Attacks on large cities and towns, the so-called district centers, were of special importance and required a large force, at least several hundred men. According to Ukrainian historian Anatoliy Kenty, the UPA command attacked the headquarters of district authorities:

- a) to force the Soviet authorities to leave more forces in district centers and thus weaken their presence in rural areas;
- b) create obstacles to the strengthening of local government and paralyze their actions against the UPA;
- c) interrupt the collection of agricultural contingent and other actions of the village authorities.

On the night of 18–19 January 1944, the soldiers attacked Ostroh. During the attack, they burned twelve buildings, including the buildings of the district committee of the CP(B)U, the NKVD regional department, club, pharmacy, and school. Twenty-five Poles were killed. On the night of 23–24 February 1944, the UPA attacked Volodymyrets. About 400 nationalists surrounded the NKVD building, where Soviet party activists were hiding. The UPA called on them first to drop their weapons and then opened fire. The battle lasted 2.5 hours. The Soviets lost four killed and seven wounded. Among the dead were, among others, the platoon commander of the Samitsky fighter battalion. After the attack, the Council held a "series of actions" to identify nationalists. Eight people were arrested.

On the night of 19–20 August 1944, the UPA attacked Komarno in the Drohobych region. They took the post office, VNOS No. 03098, and the NKVD building, releasing seventeen OUN prisoners (or 25, according to another version). The losses of the guerrillas were estimated at six killed. On the night of 30–31 August 1944, two Ukrainian SLE fighters attacked Yezupil. The guerrillas stormed the NKVD building, shot three officers and a secretary, released seven Ukrainian prisoners, and confiscated the NKVD archives. On the night of 8–9 December 1944, the UPA attacked the railway station in Sniatyn. About a hundred meters of railway tracks were blown up, a car crashed, a bridge and a distillery burned down. On 11 December 1944, the attack was repeated but the Council repulsed it this time without losses.

==== Attacks on the railways ====
In 1944–1945, compared to the German occupation, there were more UPA attacks on the railways. On 3 August 1944, a military train was blown up between Klesiv and Strasheve stations, ten cars derailed, and eight Soviet soldiers were killed. The breakdown lasted ten hours. On 11 August 1944, a train was blown up near Kamyanka-Strumylova, destroying eight cars. In 1944, the UPA blew up a medical unit in the Rivne region and took 40 nurses into the woods. On 1 May 1945, partisans blew up a train in the Sarny-Klesiv area. Twenty-seven Soviets were killed, including three majors and one colonel. On 30 September 1945, an armoured train between Klesiv and Tomashogrud stations derailed with the help of a mine planted by the UPA soldier. On the same day, but between Stryi and Stanislav, the guerrillas blew up a fuel truck. Eight tanks with their contents burned. Two carriages and two steam locomotives derailed.

=== Fights in 1945 ===
The losses suffered by the UPA in 1944, in a clash with NKVD troops, forced the OUN-b leadership to rethink tactics. Realizing that in a skirmish with the NKVD they could not succeed, in early February 1945. Shukhevych, Dmytro Hrytsai (head of the UPA Central Command), Roman Kravchuk, head of the OUN Galician regional leadership, P. Duzhiy, propaganda officer of the OUN Central leadership, Mykola Arsenych, head of the OUN Central Executive Committee, Vasily Cook. During the meeting, it was decided to move to action using mobile (small) units (four), large units to partially disband, and subordinate combat groups to the territorial leadership.

On 29 January 1945, in the Kalush region, an NKVD operative group led by Petro Furmanchak captured former UNS commander Oleksandr Lutsky. For almost two years, during interrogations, he spoke in detail about the history of the creation and activities of the UNS, UPA, and the OUN Security Council. Lutsky was shot dead in Kyiv in November 1946. According to Soviet data, at the end of February 1945, 40 large units of the UPA (2,608 people) and 68 small groups and units of the Security Service numbering 1115 soldiers, a total of 3,169 soldiers operated in the Rivne region, and in the Volyn region there were 28 "gangs" of 25 to 150 soldiers (about 1,200 in all).

After the death on 12 February 1945 of the commander of the UPA-North and the leader of the OUN-B at the PZUZ Dmytro Klyachkivsky ("Klima Savura"), the leadership was headed by Mykola Kozak ("Smok"). Assessing in one report the situation with underground personnel in the Western OUN on the PZUZ, he acknowledged that, among them, only 30% of reliable, active OUN members, and the rest were NKVD agents (50%) or ideological, passive elements (20%). From January–August 1945, the OUN Security Service liquidated 833 OUN members, who were accused of collaborating with the NKVD and KGB. In all, according to Soviet data, 9,238 Chekist military operations were conducted against the UPA in the first half of 1945: 2,565 in January, 1,448 in February, 1,849 in March, 1,568 in April, 1,205 in May, and 1,603 in June. The result was the death of 34,210 members of the UPA, captured 46059; appeared with the guilt of 25868 soldiers, a total of 106137. In addition, 5717 "gang manuals" were arrested, 5395 families of "bandits" were evicted (12,773 people).

The Red Army suffered the following casualties as a result of attacks by the UPA and armed members of the OUN-B and the suppression of armed resistance by other insurgent groups (UNRA and Melnyk's detachments) in 1944: 157 officers and 1,880 soldiers and sergeants were killed, those hanged and wounded were 74 and 1,770, respectively, and those "missing and taken to the forest" were 31 and 402. From the beginning of the year to 1 May 1945, were "killed or hanged" 33 officers and 443 soldiers and sergeants, 11 officers and 80 soldiers and sergeants disappeared missing. During the NKVD operations against the UPA in the first half of 1945 it seized a large number of weapons, ammunition and military equipment: six guns, 268 machine guns and 2,024 hand machine guns, 125 mortars, five grenade launchers, five flamethrowers, 74 PTR, 4,968 submachine guns, 17,030 rifles and pistols, 30,490 grenades, 7,385 mines, nearly three million rounds of ammunition, 31 radio stations, and seven printing presses.

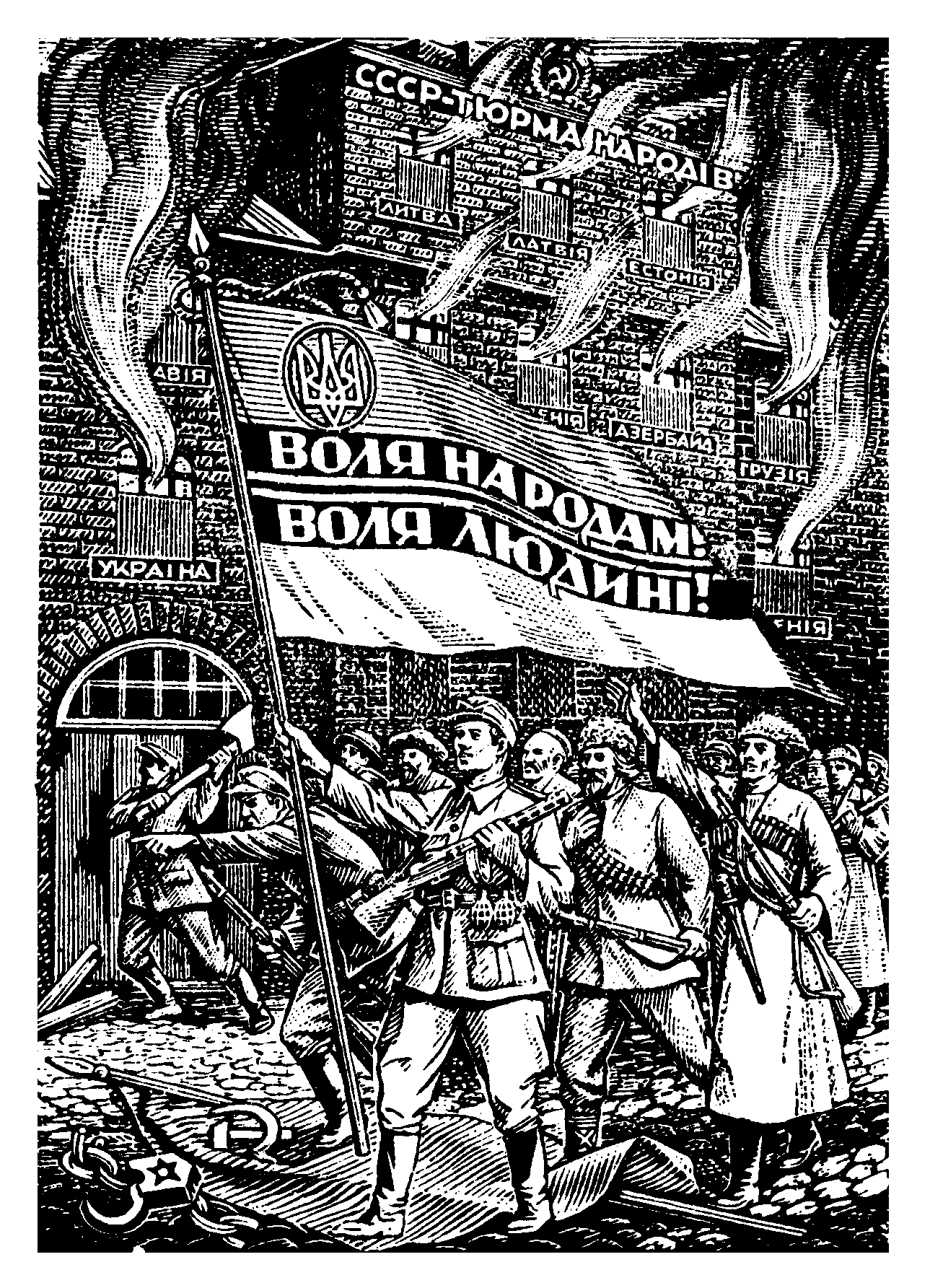
UPA propaganda poster in 1948 reading "Freedom to Nations, Freedom to People"

==== Elimination of "Klim Savur" ====
On 26 January 1945, 22 km southeast of Kamen-Kashirsky, near the village of Yaino, the 9th Rifle Company of the 169th NKVD Regiment encountered a UPA detachment. Seventeen guerrillas were killed in the battle. According to their own data, the Soviets lost only one person (a deputy company commander);^{issue 38699, op. 1, vol. 17, p. 386} however, Soviet success was determined by comparing mutual losses. During the firefight, NKVD officers detained in Volyn one of the top commanders of the UPA, Yuri Stelmashchuk – "Red" (commander of the "Tours"), who was ill with typhus.

The details of the interrogation he underwent are likely to remain secret forever. The fact is that Stelmashchuk on 8 February 1945, in the presence of Deputy People's Commissar of the Soviet General Tymofiy Strokach revealed, among other things, that on 30 November 1944 he met with UPA Commander in Volyn Dmytro Klyachkivsky (Klim Savur) near the Orzhivsky hamlet. As Stelmashchuk admitted, on 30 January 1944 they had another meeting with Savur. According to Stelmashchuk, Klyachkivsky hid in the woods during the day and in the homes of insurgent sympathizers at night. As a rule the "special purpose unit" under the command of Vasily Pavlonyuk (Uzbek) was located undercover one to 1.5 km away. He also described the house where Savur was hiding.

On 10 February 1945, a large NKVD unit transferred to the area in the centre of the villages of Orzhiv, Grabiv, Pokosy, Susk, and Brovniki, consisting of the 20th and 24th brigades of the NKVD internal troops. On the first day, Soviet troops discovered and liquidated the Uzbek detachment of Klim Savur's guard. Twenty-two guerrillas were killed but the commander of the UPA-North could not be found.

On 12 February 1945, an operative-military group of the Klevan Regional Department of the NKDB and the 233rd Separate Battalion of the NKVD under the command of Senior Lieutenant Khabibulin, clearing the forest near the Orzhiv farms in the Klevan district of Rivne region, found three UPA soldiers. They refused to surrender and opened fire, and then fled into the woods. During the pursuit, all were destroyed. Klyachkivsky was mortally wounded by Sergeant Baronov and Corporal Sokolov. Soviet troops lost one killed. Three submachine guns, two pistols, a revolver and the Order of the Red Banner were found among the killed partisans. Only Klyachkivsky's body was identified. During the operation, 42 "bandits" and 100 people who refused to enlist in the Soviet Army were killed or arrested.

==== UPA attacks on cities in 1945 ====
On 31 October 1945, the UPA decided to attack Stanislav. The city was attacked by the Skazheni unit under the command of Rizun (Vasyl Andrusyak). The raid was preceded by mortar shelling of the city center, which caused panic. Then up to 400 insurgents entered the city. The groups attacked pre-determined targets, such as the NKVD department, the party's regional committee, the military registration and enlistment office, pharmacies, shops, warehouses, partisan apartments, and apartments of state security officers. They retreated in an organized manner, capturing up to fifty people (party members and Enkavedists) and seizing equipment.

== Post-war period ==
After the end of the war, the territory of the Soviet Union underwent significant changes. On 29 June 1945, the Soviet Union and Czechoslovakia concluded an agreement according to which the Transcarpathian region became part of the Soviet Union. On 16 August 1945, the Soviet Union concluded an agreement with Poland under which Lemko, Kholm, Nadsyannia, and Podlasie became part of the Polish People's Republic, and Galicia and Volhynia were assigned to the Soviet Union. In 1945, families were evicted on an even larger scale than in the previous year. The total number of repressed was 7,393 families (17,497 people) of soldiers. According to Soviet data, from 1 October to 20 November 1945, 31 detachments carried out 31 operations to eliminate "gangs" by mobile detachments and groups of troops of the Carpathian Military District. At the same time, 146 suspects UPA supporters were killed, 13 were wounded and 969 were detained. The loss of mobile units including 17 officers, 46 privates, and sergeants killed, five officers and nine privates wounded, and two more servicemen were taken prisoner.

An information document of the NKVD from 16 January 1946, summed up the results of the "fight against banditry" in the western regions of Ukraine from February 1944 to 1 January 1946. arrested 8,370 "OUN" and 15,959 "active insurgents", appeared with the guilt of 5,058 people. In addition, 83,284 individuals who evaded conscription into the Red Army were detained. Most of these victims were civilians, as the operations of the Interior Ministry's internal troops were accompanied by various abuses. Even Soviet reports show that during the operation "there were cases of illegal executions of innocent citizens, looting, drunkenness, indiscipline of soldiers and officers, and, even worse, these crimes were not fought resolutely by soldiers".

In the winter of 1945–1946, just before the elections to the Supreme Soviet of the USSR scheduled for 10 February 1946, the Communists decided to deal a decisive blow to the UPA. Operation "Great Blockade" was organized. It consisted of the fact that after 10 January 1946, the whole of Western Ukraine was covered by garrisons of Red Army and NKVD soldiers, 3,5000, each numbering from 20 to 100 soldiers and officers, well equipped with automatic weapons. In addition, numerous hounds were created, supported by armored personnel carriers, which conducted continuous raids. The "Great Blockade" lasted until 1 April, costing the rebels at least 5,000 dead; but not dealing them a final defeat.

On 1 April 1946, as a result of a special operation, the commander of the Lysonya military district, Omelyan Polovyi, was caught alive in Lviv. He was initially sentenced to death. The sentence was later commuted to 25 years in prison camps. According to the Soviet side, in April–August 1946 in the western region of Ukraine, the Ministry of Internal Affairs and the State Security Service, internal and border troops conducted 42,175 military-KGB operations, which killed 3,277, arrested and captured 3,364 members of the OUN and UPA, 7,225 weapons were seized. In addition, in 1946, fighter battalions carried out 16,907 operations against insurgents and underground fighters, killing more than 1,000 and detaining 5,410 liberators, and seizing 2,902 weapons.

According to Soviet data, a total of 1,619 OUN-UPA armed actions were registered in 1946, 78 of which were attacks on Interior Ministry and MGB officers; for soldiers and officers of the Soviet Army – 123; for WB fighters – 204. The experience of the "Great Blockade" and the summer months of 1946 forced the leadership of the Ukrainian underground to realize that the possibilities of "insurgent-guerrilla struggle" against the overwhelming forces of the communist regime were exhausted. The Soviets had virtually unlimited opportunities to compensate for losses. Soldiers were deprived of such an opportunity. In July 1946, the leadership of the Ukrainian underground decided to gradually disband large units of the UPA and shift all the burden of further struggle to the OUN and WB militants.

On 4 October 1946, the Central Committee of the CP (B) U adopted a resolution "On the state of the struggle against the remnants of Ukrainian-German nationalists in the western regions of the USSR". The Ministry of Internal Affairs and the State Security Committee, secretaries of regional and district committees of the party were obliged to put an end to the underestimation in the fight against the remnants of the UPA and the OUN underground and to achieve their complete elimination in the near future. The command of the Prykarpattia Military District was tasked with creating operative groups in the area where the insurgents and underground were fighting and intensifying the struggle against them. The resolution came at the time of preparations for the elections to the general council of the USSR.

Thus began another wave of total attacks on the UPA in order to paralyze them in the elections and further liquidation. From 1 January to 20 March 1947, troops and bodies of the Ministry of Internal Affairs and the State Security Service carried out 12,268 operations, as a result of which the OUN and UPA killed 966 people killed and 1,478 captured. Own losses were estimated at 355 people. From 20 to 31 January 1947, the Ministry of Internal Affairs of the Ukrainian SSR conducted special operations, during which, on the basis of intelligence developments, they struck UPA command centers and cadres. In Volyn-Polissya, they managed to eliminate 79 responsible employees of the OUN and UPA. Mykola Arsenych, the head of the SB-OUN, was among those killed. According to the Soviet side, these measures led to the complete confusion, loss of ties and management of grassroots organizations in the OUN underground. There was an intensification of the tendency of voluntary surrender of insurgents and underground to the Soviet authorities or their transition to Polish territory.

In January–March 1947, Soviet sources noted 272 actions by the OUN and UPA. At the same time, it emphasized that the struggle against the Ukrainian underground was deteriorating, as a result of which activity intensified, and losses on the Soviet side increased. On 5 April 1947, the Central Committee of the Communist Party of the Soviet Union (Bolsheviks) adopted a resolution titled "On Intensifying the Fight Against the Remnants of Ukrainian-German Nationalist Gangs in the Western Regions of the Ukrainian SSR". It noted the weak struggle against UPA units and the OUN underground by party organizations in the western regions and the MGB, stressed that state security agencies were unsatisfactorily preparing and conducting military-KGB operations, many of which failed, and drew attention to the shortcomings of the combat and political training of fighters in fighter battalions.

One of the main goals of the Soviet state security agencies was the commander of the UPA-West Vasyl Sidor (Shelest). On 14 April 1949, he and his wife were found by the MGB operative group under the command of senior lieutenant Litvinenko. Both were killed in the battle. Between May 1945 and 1949, the Soviet government announced seven amnesties for members of the nationalist underground. Up to 30,000 insurgents took advantage of the government's proposal to lay down their arms in exchange for a full pardon in May 1945, and by December 1949 more than 77,000 fighters did so. Many of them faced execution, hard labor, or exile.

=== Contacts with the special services of the West ===
Following a March 1946 speech by British Prime Minister Winston Churchill declaring the beginning of the Cold War, the OUN, like other anti-Soviet organizations in Eastern Europe, came under the scrutiny of British and US intelligence services. OUN-B supporters were especially active in these contacts. Hoping for a split in the anti-Hitler coalition and an imminent war between the United States and Britain, on the one hand, and the Soviet Union, on the other, they anticipated that World War III create an independent Ukraine along the lines they desired. By 1947, about 250,000 Ukrainians were in IDP camps in the western occupation zones of Germany, Austria, and Italy. Many of these people were members or sympathizers of the OUN. After 1947, UPA fighters began to penetrate the American-occupied zone through Czechoslovakia. Camps for displaced persons became a place for the spread of ideas of Ukrainian nationalists, and Stepan Bandera set about the task of establishing control over Ukrainian emigrant circles.

One of a number of secret CIA operations against the USSR, conducted in cooperation with the secret services of Great Britain, Italy, and Germany, was called "Aerodynamics". Its essence was that the CIA provided funding and training for UPA soldiers, provided training bases and instructors, and later dumped (landed) insurgents on Soviet territory. There they were asked to collect a variety of intelligence: data on military and industrial facilities, the location of military units, their names, weapons, equipment, location of airfields, length of runways, types of aircraft and their number, the exact location of the party and administrative buildings, location of railway stations, transport, the mood in the army and the people, and also to recruit new members for OUN underground.

The operation as a whole failed. Most of the paratroopers were killed or captured, some were recruited by the Soviet secret services, and they soon began airing, providing Western intelligence with disinformation. For example, after a group of paratroopers led by a member of the OUN-B and Bandera's godfather, Myron Matvieiko, seized a group of paratroopers in June 1951, they "met" nine more OUN groups in the following weeks and months, capturing 18 people. destroyed, and 26 taken prisoner. At the same time, five of the prisoners showed readiness to cooperate with the MGB. And after a while, radio operators led by Matvieiko began to supply the West with radiograms with misinformation. They later practiced for another 10 years. On 15 March 1951, the UPA appealed to the US government to assist Ukrainian insurgents in the fight against the USSR.

Reports of the destruction of power plants in Lviv and the Korsun-Shevchenkivskyi district by UPA soldiers in December 1946

In January 2017, the CIA declassified a large amount of material relating to the CIA's relations with Ukrainian nationalists. American spies contacted the leadership of the OUN immediately after the war in the second half of the 1940s, and this connection was broken only in the early 1990s with the collapse of the Soviet Union. One of the earliest documents dates back to April 1947. The report on terrorist acts committed on the territory of Ukraine states that a power plant was blown up in Lviv and a hydroelectric power plant in the Korsun-Shevchenkivskyi district. A large number of civilian casualties had been reported.

=== Final suppression of the insurgency ===
The losses suffered by the Ukrainian underground in the second half of the 1940s were difficult to compensate. After the early 1950s, only deep-seated OUN militants fought. Fighting them increasingly turned into "sudden attacks". During the transitions, the guerrillas pretended to be local peasants, had with them various household tools: axes, saws, or fishing rods. They watered their tracks with kerosene, sprinkled with tobacco or pepper, moved along the bottom of rivers and streams, or went out on roads where there was heavy traffic, all to deceive the pursuit, which conducted a search using dogs. The activity of the underground fell, but this did not prevent it from carrying out operations from time to time. A defiant action, for example, was organized on 10 July 1951, in Nadvirna. At around 11 p.m., guerrillas stormed a local hospital, killing two MGB guards who were watching a wounded OUN activist, taking the woman away and fleeing.

In March 1950, UPA Commander-in-Chief Roman Shukhevych was killed. In 1952, the Khmelnytsky Oblast State Security Service liquidated two OUN guerrilla groups in the Kyiv Oblast and three in the Vinnytsia Oblast. It is worth noting that the Soviets managed to create a fictitious OUN leadership in this area under the leadership of Agent "N-26", against members of the underground, he spoke under the pseudonym "Skob". Subsequently, "N-26" played an important role in the liquidation of the OUN Central Committee. As of 17 March 1955, there remained a total of eleven small UPA groups in the western regions of the Ukrainian SSR, with a total of 32 members, 17 single underground activists, and 50 illegals. Although so many insurgents were no longer able to respond adequately to the repressive measures of the Soviet government, in 1955-1956 they carried out 35 actions, including 10 assassinations and 15 attempted assassinations.

In July 1955, after a 10-hour battle in the village of Sushky, the last OUN militia in the Zhytomyr region, consisting of two underground fighters, was destroyed. The last active group of the OUN, consisting of three people, was physically liquidated by the KGB in April 1960 in the Ternopil region. On the other hand, between 445,000 and 500,000 residents of the western regions of Ukraine were killed, arrested, or deported as a result of repression by the secret services to suppress the UPA. The number of dead alone reached more than 155,000 insurgents, and the number of deportees reached 203,662, so Soviet repression, accompanying the struggle against the underground, affected every tenth inhabitant of western Ukraine. In battles with the UPA in 1944–45, the NKVD captured more than 300 German servicemen (mostly Abwehr and Gestapo officers) who remained in the insurrection. The Germans remained until the end of January 1947, when the OUN Security Council purposefully liquidated them so as not to compromise the movement to the West. Stepan Bandera was assassinated in October 1959 in Munich by KGB assassin Bohdan Stashynsky on the orders of Nikita Khrushchev. After the war, western Ukraine was annexed into the Soviet Union and 570,826 people were deported, including OUN-UPA family members, to other regions of USSR without permission to return.

== See also ==
- 14th Waffen Grenadier Division of the SS (1st Galician)
- Historiography of the Volyn tragedy
- History of Galicia (Eastern Europe)
- Massacres of Poles in Volhynia and Eastern Galicia
- Schutzmannschaft Battalion 118
- Subdivisions of Polish territories during World War II
- Ukrainian collaboration with Nazi Germany
- Ukrainian Legion of Self-Defense
- Ukrainian Military Organization
- Ukrainian national government (1941)
- Ukrainian People's Militsiya
- Volhynian Bloody Sunday
- Ukrainian liberation movement (1920–1950)

== Bibliography ==
- Krivosheev, Grigory (2001). Soviet Casualties and Combat Losses in the Twentieth Century (in Russian). Moscow: Олма-Пресс. ISBN 5-224-01515-4.
- Motyka, Grzegorz (2006). Ukraińska partyzantka 1942-1960. Działalność Organizacji Ukraińskich Nacjonalistów i Ukraińskiej Powstańczej Armii [Ukrainian partisans 1942-1960. Activities of the Organization of Ukrainian Nationalists and the Ukrainian Insurgent Army] (in Polish). Warsaw.
- Rossoliński-Liebe, Grzegorz (2014). Stepan Bandera: The Life and Afterlife of a Ukrainian Nationalist: Fascism, Genocide, and Cult. Columbia University Press. ISBN 978-3838266848.
- Snyder, Timothy (2003). "The Causes of Ukrainian-Polish Ethnic Cleansing 1943" (PDF). Past & Present (179): 197–234. doi:10.1093/past/179.1.197.
- Marples, David (2007). Heroes and Villains: Creating National History in Contemporary Ukraine. Central European University Press. p. 177. ISBN 978-9637326981.
- Dixon; Sarkees, Jeffrey S.; Meredith Reid (2015). A Guide to Intra-state Wars. CQ Press. ISBN 978-0872897755.
