= Western Operational Group (Ukrainian Insurgent Army) =

Operational group of the Ukrainian Insurgent Army

UPA-West
- УПА-Захід
- Active: December 1943 – 1949
- Allegiance: Ukrainian Insurgent Army

Commanders
- Notable commanders: Oleksandr Lutskyi; Vasyl Sydor

The Western Operational Group of the Ukrainian Insurgent Army (Ukrainian: Оперативна група УПА-Захід, romanized: Operatyvna hrupa UPA-Zakhid), also known as UPA-West (Ukrainian: УПА-Захід, romanized: UPA-Zakhid), was one of the three operational groups of the Ukrainian Insurgent Army.

== History ==
UPA-West was established in December 1943 as one of the UPA's three operational groups, alongside UPA-South and UPA-North. A fourth operational group, UPA-East, was planned but never realised.

UPA-West was formed as a successor to the Ukrainian People's Self-Defence (UNS), a unit of the Organisation of Ukrainian Nationalists. It retained the leadership of the UNS (including leader Oleksandr Lutskyi), as well as the right to use the name of the UNS. At lower levels, the transition from the UNS to UPA-West took until March 1944.

UPA-West grew to become one of the largest and most effective groups of the UPA (in particular, the 4th Military District), and the operational group was assisted logistically by the OUN, which provided food and weaponry and organised recruitment efforts. However, with the gradual decline of the UPA insurgency, it would be eventually cease to function in 1949, and Vasyl Sydor (UPA-West's commander since 1947) was killed in combat with the NKVD.

== Structure ==
At its founding, the Western Operational Group had six military districts:

1. 1st Military District (also known as Bashta), under the command of Viktor Kharkiv, oversaw units in and around the city of Lviv.
2. 2nd Military District (also known as Buh), under the command of Ostap Lynda, oversaw units in Lviv Oblast.
3. 3rd Military District (also known as Lysonia), under the command of Omelian Polovyi, oversaw units in Ternopil Oblast.
4. 4th Military District (also known as Hoverla), under the command of Ivan Butkovskyi, oversaw units in Stanislaviv Oblast.
5. 5th Military District (also known as Makivka), under the command of Bohdan Vilshynskyi, oversaw units in Drohobych Oblast.
6. 6th Military District (also known as Sian), under the command of Yakiv Chornii, oversaw units in Zakerzonia.

An additional two military districts in Bukovina and Carpathian Ruthenia were planned, but never came to fruition.
