= Zolota Sloboda =

Rural locality in Ternopil Oblast, Ukraine

Zolota Sloboda Золота Слобода
- Location in Ternopil Oblast
- Coordinates: 49°25′17″N 25°15′3″E
- Country: Ukraine
- Oblast: Ternopil Oblast
- Raion: Ternopil Raion
- Hromada: Kozova settlement hromada
- Time zone: UTC+2 (EET)
  - Summer (DST): UTC+3 (EEST)
- Postal code: 47653

Zolota Sloboda (Ukrainian: Золота Слобода) is a village in Kozova settlement hromada, Ternopil Raion, Ternopil Oblast, Ukraine.

== History ==
The first written mention of the village was in 1649.

After the liquidation of the Kozova Raion on 19 July 2020, the village became part of the Ternopil Raion.

== Religion ==
- Church of the Intercession (1899; brick, reconstructed in 1990).

== Sources ==
- (in Ukrainian) Данилюк Б., Золота Слобода // Ternopil Encyclopedic Dictionary: in 4 v. / editorial board: H. Yavorskyi and other, Ternopil: "Zbruch", 2004, V. 1: А—Й, S. 657–658. — ISBN 966-528-197-6.
- "Słoboda 12.) S., wś, pow. brzeżański". Geographical Dictionary of the Kingdom of Poland (in Polish). 10. Warszawa: Kasa im. Józefa Mianowskiego. 1889. p. 801.
