= Northern Operational Group (Ukrainian Insurgent Army) =

Operational group of the Ukrainian Insurgent Army

UPA-North
- УПА-Північ
- Active: 1943–1953
- Allegiance: Ukrainian Insurgent Army

Commanders
- Notable commanders: Dmytro Klyachkivsky; Mykola Kozak; Petro Oliinyk; Ivan Lytvynchuk

The Northern Operational Group of the Ukrainian Insurgent Army (Ukrainian: Оперативна група УПА-Північ, romanized: Operatyvna hrupa UPA-Pivnich), also known as UPA-North (Ukrainian: УПА-Північ, romanized: UPA-Pivnich), was one of the three operational groups of the Ukrainian Insurgent Army. It operated in Volhynia, Zhytomyr Oblast, Kyiv Oblast, and in the southern Byelorussian Soviet Socialist Republic.

== History ==
UPA-North was established in 1943, alongside the Western and Southern operational groups. A fourth group, the Eastern Operational Group, was conceived but never formally established.

Prior to the creation of UPA-North, there had already been two organisations known as the Ukrainian Insurgent Army operating in Volhynia and Polesia. The older organisation, created in the spring of 1942, was a group of 300–500 soldiers commanded by Taras Bulba-Borovets, better known as the Ukrainian People's Revolutionary Army. The later organisation was the Ukrainian Insurgent Army belonging to Stepan Bandera's wing of the Organisation of Ukrainian Nationalists, which began operating in February 1943. Efforts were made in March 1943 to unify the two groups, but were unsuccessful, owing to the Banderites launching an insurgency against German occupational forces. In the summer of 1943, Dmytro Klyachkivsky decided to attack supporters of Borovets and Andriy Melnyk. This process led to the successful unification of Ukrainian forces in Volhynia and Polesia under the Ukrainian Insurgent Army.

The Northern Operational Group was heavily involved in the massacres of Poles in Volhynia and Eastern Galicia. A directive from the period called on soldiers of the operational group to "destroy all traces of the Poles" by "destroying all Polish churches and all other Polish places of worship. Destroy all farm homes, so there is no evidence that anyone ever lived there."

Klyachkivsky, UPA-North's first commander, died in battle with Soviet troops on 12 February 1945, and he was succeeded by Mykola Kozak. In September 1945, he was succeeded by Petro Oliinyk, who served until his own death in 1946. After him was Ivan Lytvynchuk, who died on 19 January 1951. By the time Oliinyk had become commander, however, UPA-North had effectively ceased to exist as a result of Soviet counter-insurgency efforts.

UPA-North continued to operate in a greatly-reduced form in southern Belarus until late 1953, when the group was completely crushed by Soviet troops.

== Demographics ==
The Northern Operational Group drew Ukrainians from primarily working-class backgrounds, and has been characterised as more reflective of a "workers' and peasants' army" than Soviet partisans by Ukrainian historian Ivan Patryliak. Several Ukrainians in Belarus also joined UPA-North, with the total number of Belarusian members being as many as 15,000. Belarusians had a separate unit within the UPA, commanded by Oleksandr Stepaniuk from 1949.

== Structure ==
The Northern Operational Group comprised four different military districts:

1. 1st Military District (also known as Zahrava), under the command of Ivan Lytvynchuk, oversaw units in northern Rivne Oblast.
2. 2nd Military District (also known as Bohun), under the command of Petro Oliinyk, commanded troops in southern Rivne Oblast.
3. 3rd Military District (also known as Turiv), under the command of Yurii Stelmashchuk, commanded troops in Volyn Oblast and the Byelorussian SSR's Brest Region.
4. 4th Military District (also known as Tiutiunnyk), under the command of Fedir Vorobets, commanded troops in Zhytomyr Oblast and western Kyiv Oblast.

UPA-North possessed a slightly different organisation from the other operational groups; while UPA-South lacked any sub-groups below military districts and UPA-West had "tactical groups", UPA-North had two sub-groups for military districts, "raion" and "nadraion".
