= Ivan Hrynokh =

Ukrainian Greek Catholic priest and activist

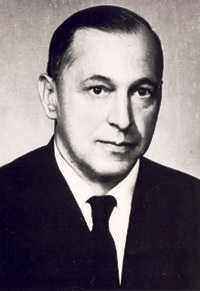

Ivan Hrynokh (Ukrainian: Іван Гриньох; 28 December 1907 – 14 October 1994) was a Ukrainian Greek-Catholic priest and Ukrainian community activist.

Born in the village of Pavliv near Lviv to Mykhailo and Anastiya Hrynokh on 28 December 1907, his parents immigrated to the United States in 1909 and settled in Philadelphia where his brother Stepan was born in 1911. The family returned to their home village in 1911.

Ivan received his high school education in Lviv and commenced theological studies there, which he completed with a doctorate studying in Innsbruck, Munich and Paris. He took on priestly vows in September 1932 from Metropolitan Andrei Sheptytsky and taught philosophy and theology at the Theological Academy in Lviv. He was arrested by the Polish government in 1938 and remained incarcerated at the Bereza Kartuska detention camp until the fall of Poland.

With the annexation of Western Ukraine by the Soviets, Hrynokh traveled to Kraków where he preached and was active in Ukrainian politics. He became the chaplain to the Nachtigall Battalion. After the dissolution of the Battalion, he participated in the 3rd Great Conference of the Organization of Ukrainian Nationalists, which took place in Ukraine in 1943 and was one of the instigators of the Ukrainian Supreme Liberation Council, where he was elected vice president in July 1944.

In this position, he fulfilled a diplomatic mission in talks with the Romanian and Hungarian governments. He was sent to the West to find alliances for the UPA with the Allied forces and traveled via Prague to Germany settling in Munich. In 1950, he became the head of the foreign section of the UHVR which he chaired until 1980. At the same time, he was the head of the Society for Foreign Studies and founded the newspaper "Suchasna Ukraina" (Contemporary Ukraine), "Ukrainska Literaturna hazeta" (The Ukrainian literary newspaper) and the magazine "Suchasnist'" (Today).

He continued teaching theology and philosophy in seminaries in Hischberg and Kulenburg and was a professor at the Ukrainian Free University in Munich.

With the release by the Soviets of Metropolitan Joseph Slipyj in 1963, a Ukrainian Catholic University was established in Rome, where he became professor. He was one of the founders of the patriarchal movement for the Ukrainian-Catholic Church.

Hrynokh died on 14 October 1994 in Munich, at the age of 87. He was buried in Pennsylvania.
