= Ukrainian Supreme Liberation Council =

Legislature of areas controlled by the Ukrainian Insurgent Army

Ukrainian Supreme Liberation Council Українська головна визвольна рада Ukrainska holovna vyzvolna rada

Type
- Type: Unicameral house of the Ukrainian Insurgent Army

History
- Founded: 15 July 1944
- Disbanded: 1950
- Preceded by: Cell of Ukrainian Nationalists; People's Revolutionary Liberation Organisation (partially)
- Succeeded by: Supreme Soviet of the Ukrainian Soviet Socialist Republic

Leadership
- President: Kyrylo Osmak, USRP
- First Vice-President: Vasyl Mudry, UNDO
- Second Vice-President: Ivan Hrynokh, UGCC
- Third Vice-President: Ivan Vovchuk, OUN

Structure
- Political groups: Organisation of Ukrainian Nationalists (Stepan Bandera wing) Ukrainian Greek Catholic Church Ukrainian Insurgent Army Ukrainian National Democratic Alliance Ukrainian Socialist-Revolutionary Party

Meeting place
- Inconsistent (Note: The UHVR did not have a permanent location as a result of changing conditions during World War II and the corresponding anti-Soviet insurgency by the Ukrainian Insurgent Army. It met in various regions of western Ukraine, holding its founding congress in the foothills of the Carpathian Mountains.)

The Ukrainian Supreme Liberation Council (Ukrainian: Українська головна визвольна рада, romanized: Ukrainska holovna vyzvolna rada; abbreviated UHVR) was a secretive legislature and de facto provisional government in areas under the control of the Ukrainian Insurgent Army (UPA) during and shortly after World War II. UHVR was initially dominated by the Bandera faction of the Organisation of Ukrainian Nationalists and the Ukrainian Insurgent Army, but included also members of some other political parties, and the Ukrainian Greek Catholic Church. The UHVR served to convince both Ukrainians and the international community that it was a serious group concerned with consensus-building and the establishment of an independent state.

== History ==
The idea of establishing a non-partisan platform that would allow the UPA to present itself outside as an all-Ukrainian force emerged within its leadership in the autumn of 1943. On 21 September 1943, Shukhevych formally presented this proposal to Lev Shankovskyi who was formally non-partisan but in fact associated with the OUN-B. In March 1944, in Zhovkva, the Banderites established a Preparatory Commission representing the OUN-B and an Initiative Committee representing the UPA Command.

The five-member commission consisted of individuals affiliated with the OUN-B. It was chaired by Shankovskyi, with Ребет Дарія Омелянівна and Ilia Semianchuk serving as vice-chairs, while Mykhailo Stepaniak and Vasyl Okhrymovych were members. No representatives of other Ukrainian political circles were present at the congress, despite ongoing contacts with the government of the Ukrainian People's Republic (UNR), the OUN-M, supporters of the Hetmanate, and the Greek Catholic metropolitanate.

The Ukrainian Supreme Liberation Council was formed on the congress on 11–15 July 1944. The exact location is not known. It was either a forester's lodge near the village of Nedilna in Sambir County, or Mount Vydilok, located somewhat farther away to the south of the village of Sprynia.

The UHVR was placed in charge of directing resistance efforts in areas under German control. This brought it into contradiction with the People's Revolutionary Liberation Organisation (NVRO), a name adopted by members of the OUN-B remaining in Volhynia occupied by the Soviets, in order to open up to other non-partisan and supranational forces. It was soon determined that only one group could be responsible for coordinating Ukrainian nationalist activities. The NVRO was formally absorbed into the UHVR by a November 1944 act of the latter.

The UHVR was not composed wholly of individuals from western Ukraine, the OUN's traditional support base; the presidency was held by Kyrylo Osmak, a member of the Ukrainian Socialist-Revolutionary Party and a former member of the Central Rada from Poltava Oblast, while the vice-presidents were members of the centrist Ukrainian National Democratic Alliance party (Vasyl Mudry), the Ukrainian Greek Catholic Church (Ivan Hrynokh), and the OUN (Ivan Vovchuk) The only major party in Ukraine not to participate in the UHVR was the wing of the OUN loyal to Andriy Melnyk.

In reality, however, power rested in the hands of the Secretariat, which was composed of individuals affiliated with the OUN-B and the UPA. Roman Shukhevych, leader of the UPA, was head of the UHVR's general secretariat and tasked with forming a government. Mykola Lebed served as Secretary for Foreign Affairs, while Rostyslav Voloshyn was Secretary for Internal Affairs. Osmak was merely a figurehead, furthermore he was arrested on 13 September 1944. The establishment of the UHWR elevated Shukhevych to a position of major prominence, as he simultaneously served as the commander of the UPA, the head of the OUN, and the UHWR.

After the end of the Second World War, the council co-ordinated resistance efforts in Soviet Ukraine. It also organised the boycott of the Soviet-sponsored elections in 1946. After the killing of Shukhevych in 1950 by Soviet MGB forces during battle, most members of the council were arrested, and the council ceased to exist.

Members of UHVR abroad, led by Hrynokh, formed External Representation group of the council (ZP UHVR), which popularised the efforts of the Ukrainian dissident movement in the West.

The ZP UVHR had more long lasting success, with former OUN-B leader Mykola Lebed linked to it. In 1951, in Munich, the UHVR began publishing the bi-weekly newspaper "Suchasna Ukraina" and the monthly "Ukrainian Literary Gazette", on the basis of which the magazine Suchasnist was published in 1961, affiliated with the CIA-linked "Prolog Corporation". It was an important pan-ideological magazine for the Ukrainian diaspora during the Cold War.

== See also ==
- Ukrainian liberation movement (1920–1950)

== Bibliography ==
- Motyka, Grzegorz (2006). Ukraińska partyzantka 1942–1960 (in Polish). Warsaw: RYTM. ISBN 83-7399-163-8.
