= Dmytro Klyachkivsky =

Ukrainian Insurgent Army commander (1911–1945)

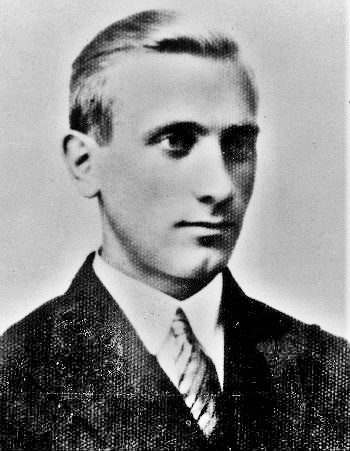
- Klyachkivsky in the 1930s
- Nicknames: Klym Savur, Okhrim, Bilash
- Born: 4 November 1911; Zbarazh, Galicia and Lodomeria, Austria-Hungary (now Ukraine)
- Died: 12 February 1945 (aged 33) Orzhiv, Ukrainian SSR, Soviet Union (now Ukraine)
- Allegiance: Ukrainian Insurgent Army
- Commands: Northern Operational Group
- Conflicts: World War II; Eastern Front; Massacres of Poles in Volhynia and Eastern Galicia; Defence of Przebraże; Anti-Soviet resistance by the Ukrainian Insurgent Army †

Dmytro Semenovych Klyachkivsky (Ukrainian: Дмитро Семенович Клячківський; 4 November 1911 – 12 February 1945), also known by the pseudonyms Klym Savur, Okhrim, and Bilash, was a commander of the Ukrainian Insurgent Army (UPA) and the first head-commander of UPA-North. He was responsible for the massacres of Poles in Volhynia and Eastern Galicia, which killed around 100,000 Polish people and have been recognized by Poland as a genocide.

== Biography ==
Klyachkivsky was born on 4 November 1911 in the city of Zbarazh, then part of Austria-Hungary (now Ukraine) as a son of a bank clerk. His father, Semen Klyahkivsky, was a member of the Sich Riflemen until 1919, when he fell ill with typhus and died. His mother, Tekla, became a washerwoman in order to provide for the family after Semen's death, and two of the family's adult children migrated to Canada to work for the family. As a child, Klyachkivsky was a devout member of the Ukrainian Greek Catholic Church and sang in a church choir.

Klyachkivsky completed his secondary studies and entered the law faculty of the Jan Kazimierz University in Lwów. From the mid- to late 1930s, Klyachkivsky began to be attracted to the Ukrainian independence movement, joining the Sokil youth group and the Narodna Torhivlia cooperative. He worked at the latter from 1935 to 1938. His interest in Ukrainian independence was encouraged by two former officers of the Sich Riflemen who were important in Zbarazh's community: D. Hamalai, a lawyer and leader of the Ukrainian Radical Party in Zbarazh, and V. Babiako, head of the local agricultural cooperative. A member of the Organisation of Ukrainian Nationalists (OUN), he served in the Polish Army.

After the 1939 invasion of Poland, Galicia and Volhynia were annexed by the Soviet Union. The NKVD arrested Klyachkivsky in Lviv and sentenced him to death, which was commuted to 10 years of incarceration. He escaped from Berdychiv prison in July 1941.

He was a member of the Directorate of the OUN in Lviv, the regional leader of OUN-B from January 1942, a member of the leadership of OUN and the first commander of the Ukrainian Insurgent Army from 1943 on. He was given the rank of major and made the regional commander of the UPA-North in 1944, and he briefly joined the People's Revolutionary Liberation Organisation, a left-wing group in Volhynia that was active the same year.

=== Massacres of Poles in Volhynia ===
Klyachkivsky was the initiator of the massacres of Poles in Volhynia and Eastern Galicia in modern-day western Ukraine in the years 1943–1945. It was his directive, issued in mid-1943, that ordered the extermination of the Polish population across the province. One Ukrainian Insurgent Army commander who opposed it was threatened by Klyachkivsky with court-martial.

Evidence of his actions was found in SBU archives by Polish historian Władysław Filar and was published in 2000 in his book Before action Wisla, there was Volhynia. It was an order addressed to the commanders of the Ukrainian Insurgent Army in Volhynia. This secret directive stated:

We should undertake the great action of the liquidation of the Polish element. As the German armies withdraw, we should take advantage of this convenient moment for liquidating the entire male population in the age from 16 up to 60 years. We cannot lose this fight, and it is necessary at all costs to weaken Polish forces. Villages and settlements situated next to the large forests should disappear from the face of the earth.

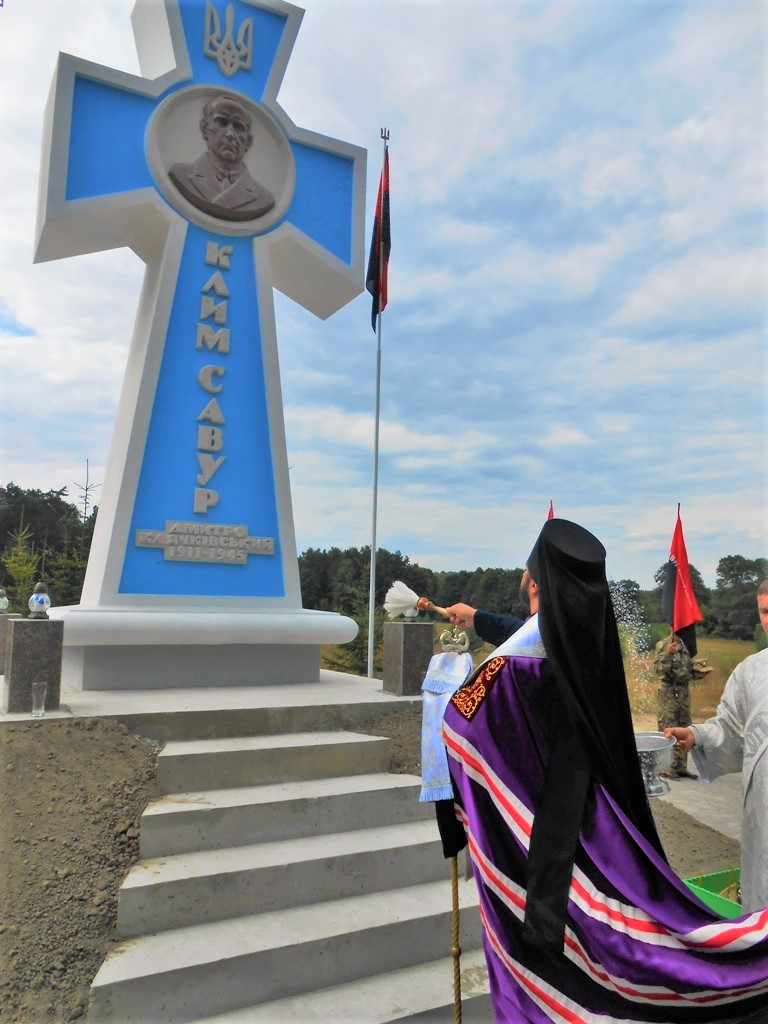
Monument to Dmytro Klyachkivsky as Klym Savur at his place of death near Orzhiv, sprinkled with holy water by a Ukrainian Orthodox bishop

Nevertheless, as noted by Timothy Snyder, among the tens of thousands of Poles murdered by UPA on his orders, most of the victims were women and children.

According to a Ukrainian historian Sergei Ryabenko, the "secret directive" cited by many authors is of questionable authenticity. The document signature referenced by the authors does not exist in the SBU archives, and other signatures lead to a criminal case against a deserter from Soviet army Adam Mitchik, who then joined UPA, and was later captured by the Soviets. The NKVD interrogation protocol of Mitchik from 1945 is the only archival document that contains a reference to Klyachkivsky and "secret directive", with statements similar to the above text. Based on these results Ryabenko postulated that the "secret directive" never existed and the above quote was compiled from statements attributed to Mitchik in the interrogation protocol, likely written by NKVD and signed by the defendant under torture.

Regardless of the "secret directive", other references suggest local orders to massacre the Polish population. In particular, Y. Stelmashchuk, the local commander of the UPA, stated during his NKVD interrogation:

In the same June of 1943, ― the defendant submits information, ― in the Kolkiv forest, I met with Klym Savur [Klyachkivskyi], the deputy head of the stake of the main team Andriyenko. Savur gave me the order to destroy all the Poles of the Kovel district. All the leaders of the Kovel Oblast, including me, opposed this proposal, but Savur threatened me with a field trial. The situation was difficult. I had no right not to comply with the order, and personal convictions did not allow me to comply. I turned to Andrienko. Andrienko told me that these instructions are not from the center, that they are distortions on the ground, but he did not say anything specific.

Ukrainian historian Volodymyr Viatrovych, uses it to support the claim that at that time the murders were not done at the order of the central leadership, but were a local initiative.

In another NKVD interrogation M. Stepaniak claimed that he and M. Lebed, at the Third Great Assembly of the OUN in August 1943 criticized Klyachkivskyi's policy and that the UPA "compromised itself with its banditry actions against the Polish population, just as the OUN compromised itself with its ties to the Germans." As a result of the aggravation of contradictions between the leaders of the OUN, R. Shukhevich was elected instead of M. Lebed as the head of the Bureau of the Central Directorate in April 1943.

== Death ==
Klyachkivsky was killed in an ambush by the forces of the NKVD in February 1945 near the settlement of Orzhiv in the vicinity of Rivne. He was posthumously awarded the title of Colonel of the UPA and UPA Gold Cross of Military Honors First Grade.

== See also ==
- Roman Shukhevych, general of the Ukrainian Insurgent Army
