= Nastup (Ukrainian periodical) =

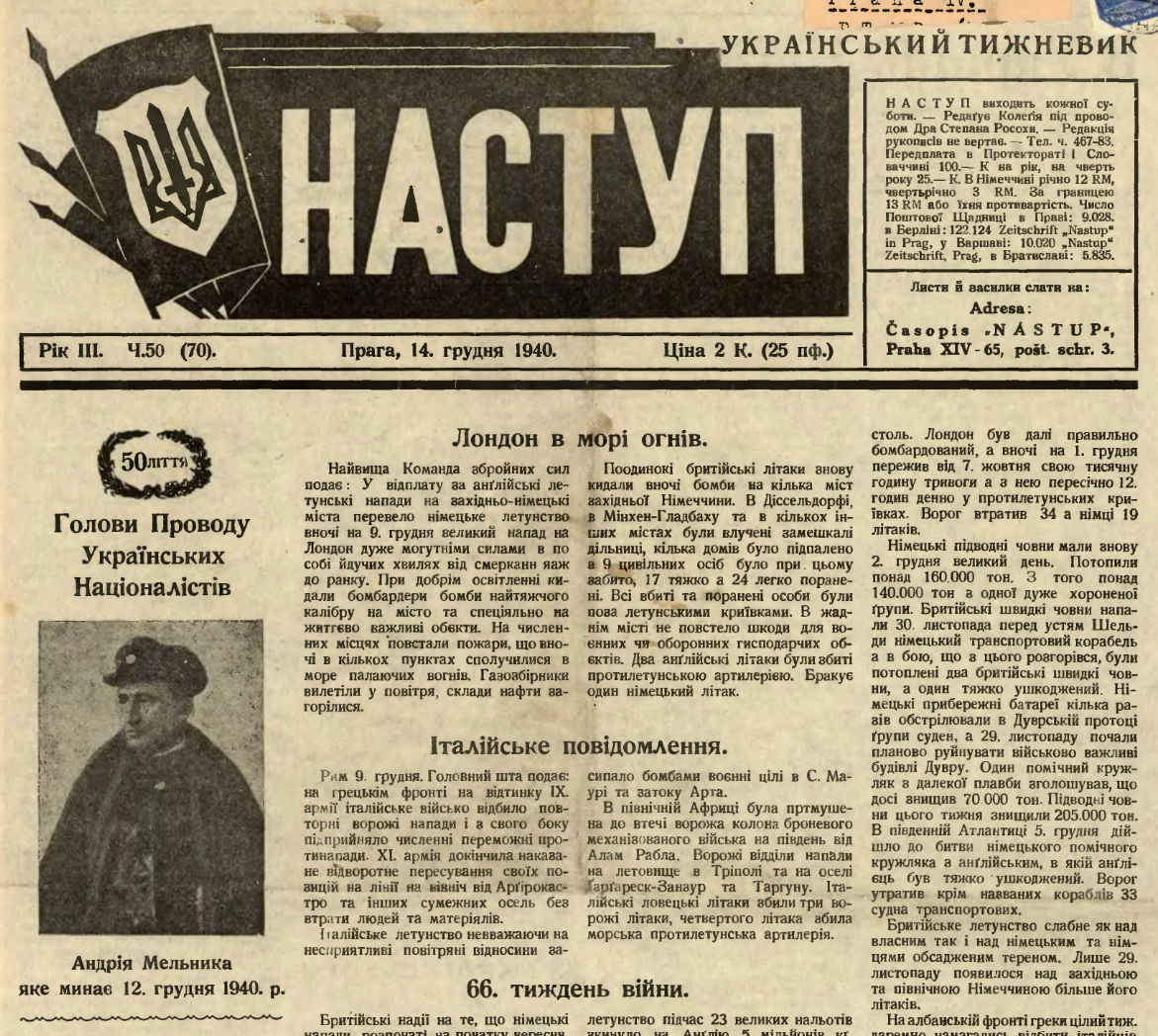
Front page of Nastup on 14 December 1940, marking the 50th birthday of OUN(m) leader Andriy Melnyk.

Nastup (Ukrainian: «Наступ», lit. 'advance, offensive') was a Ukrainian periodical published between 1938 and 1944. From 1940, it was printed out of Prague as a press organ of the Melnykite faction of the Organisation of Ukrainian Nationalists (OUN).

== History ==
Nastup was established in 1938 by Stepan Rosokha as a press organ of the Carpathian Sich, printing twice-weekly out of Uzhhorod and Khust. It featured articles on the history of Ukraine and of Carpathian Ukrainians as well as nationalist topics. It ceased publication in 1939 at the onset of the Hungarian occupation of Carpatho-Ukraine.

From 1940, Nastup was printed weekly out of the Protectorate of Bohemia and Moravia as a press organ of the OUN(m) whereafter it reached a circulation of 12,000 copies. Rosokha was a fervent supporter of Andriy Melnyk as leader of the OUN and Nastup regularly published articles by OUN(m) members.

In response to the assassination of OUN(m) members Mykola Stsiborskyi and Omelyan Senyk, Nastup launched a press campaign against the Banderites with an editorial on 20 September 1941 declaring that "the time of amnesty for them is past, their sins cannot be forgiven". It also reported on OUN(m) activities in Ukraine in 1941 and provided publicity for the SS Galicia Division in May 1943.

Nastup experienced relatively mild censorship until it was suppressed by the Nazi authorities in 1943, ceasing publication in January 1944 when Rosokha was imprisoned in a concentration camp.

== Bibliography ==
- Armstrong, John (1963). Ukrainian Nationalism (2nd ed.). New York: Columbia University Press.
- Vasily, Gabor (2020). "Nastup". Encyclopedia of Modern Ukraine (in Ukrainian).
