= Zahvizdia =

Village in Ivano-Frankivsk Oblast, Ukraine

Zahvizdia Загвіздя
- Village
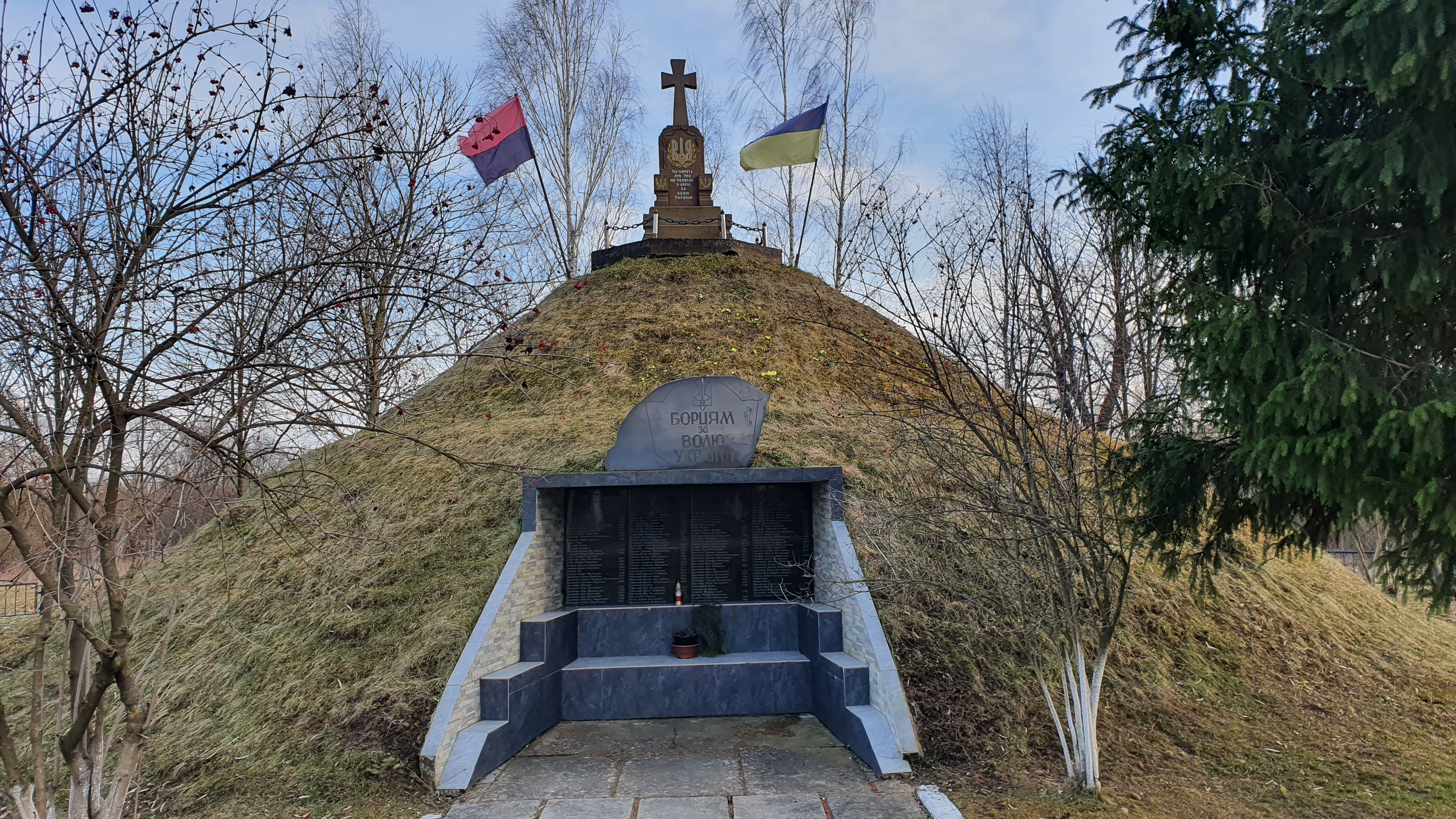
- Monument to Ukrainian independence fighters in Zahvizdia

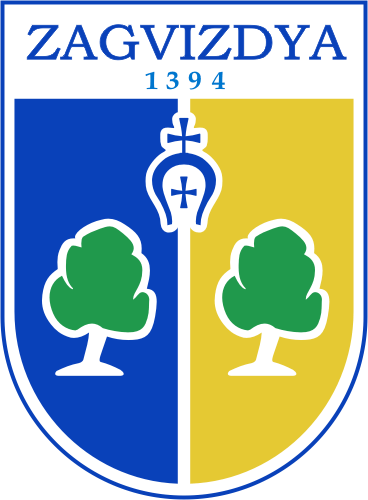
- Coat of arms

- Location of Zahvizdia in Ivano-Frankivsk Oblast Location of Zahvizdia in Ukraine
- Coordinates: 48°55′21″N 24°39′17″E
- Country: Ukraine
- Oblast: Ivano-Frankivsk Oblast
- Raion: Ivano-Frankivsk Raion
- First mentioned: 1394

Zahvizdia (Ukrainian: Загвіздя; Polish: Zagwoźdź) is a village in Ukraine, in the Ivano-Frankivsk Raion of Ivano-Frankivsk Oblast. It is the centre of the Zahvizdia rural hromada.

== History ==
Zahvizdia was first mentioned by Władysław II Jagiełło in a 1394 letter granting Danylo Zaderevetskyi control over several villages in Galicia. According to a 1949 report by the Ministry of State Security of the Soviet Union, the Organisation of Ukrainian Nationalists was active in Zahvizdia.

== Demographics ==
According to the 2001 Ukrainian census, 99.3% of Zahvizdia speaks Ukrainian, while another 0.5% of the population speaks Russian. 0.1% of the village additionally speaks Armenian.

== Notable residents ==
- Stepan Lenkavskyi, Organisation of Ukrainian Nationalists leader
- Vasyl Striltsiv, Ukrainian Soviet dissident
- Ivan Tsyperdiuk, Ukrainian poet
