= Oleh Medunytsia =

Ukrainian politician

- Олег Медуниця
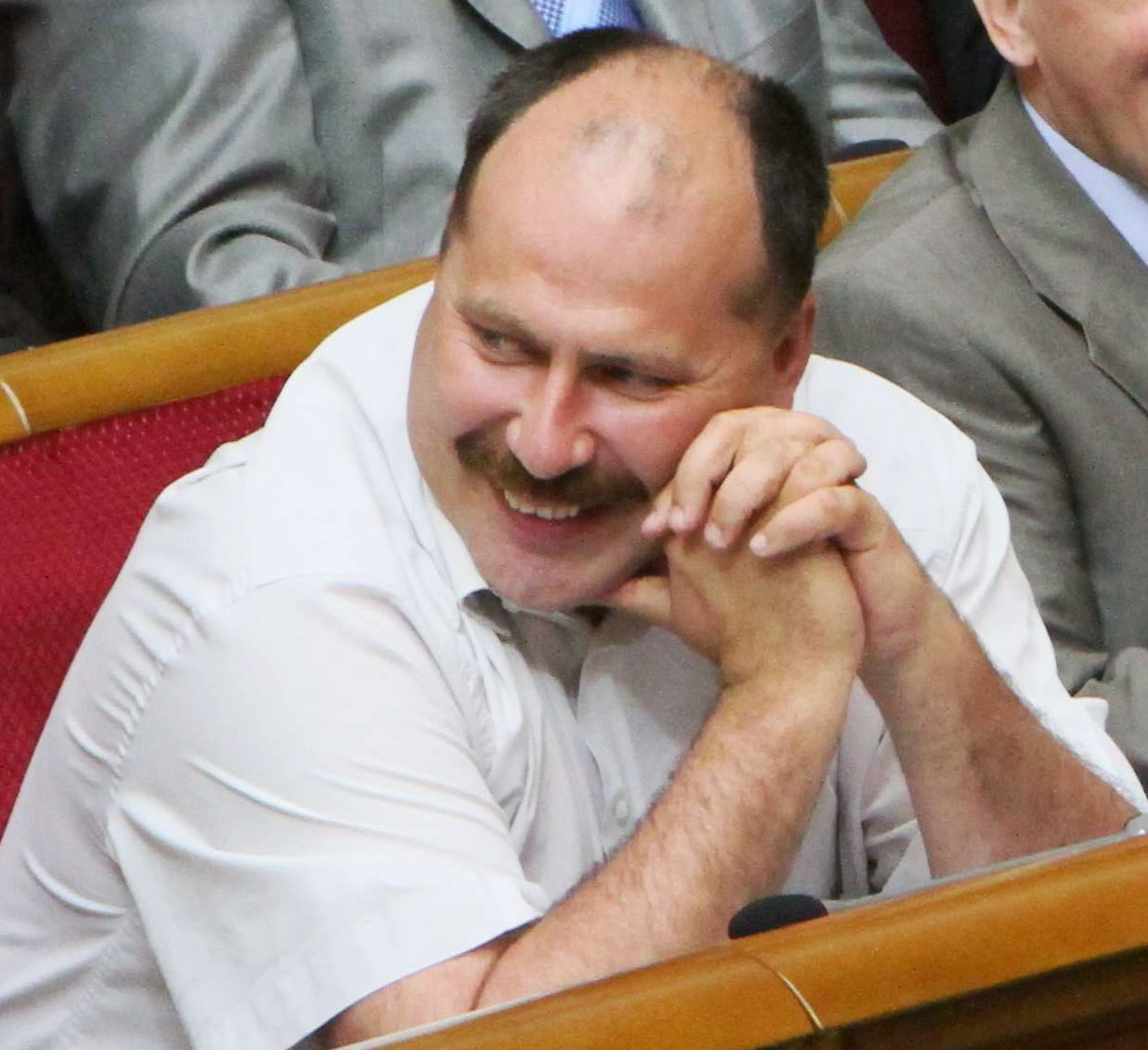
- Medunytsia in 2013

People's Deputy of Ukraine
- In office 12 December 2012 – 29 August 2019
- Preceded by: Constituency established
- Succeeded by: Tetiana Skrypka
- Constituency: Sumy Oblast, No. 157

Personal details
- Born: 27 June 1971 (age 55) Sumy, Ukrainian SSR, Soviet Union (now Ukraine)
- Party: People's Front
- Other political affiliations: Independent; Batkivshchyna; Organization of Ukrainian Nationalists
- Education: Sumy State Pedagogic University after A.S.Makarenko

Oleh Viacheslavovych Medunytsia (Ukrainian: Олег Вячеславович Медуниця; born 27 June 1971) is a Ukrainian politician who served as People's Deputy of Ukraine in the 7th and 8th convocations of the Verkhovna Rada (Ukraine's parliament) elected in electoral district 157 located in Sumy.

== Early life and career ==
Oleh Viacheslavovych Medunytsia was born on 27 June 1971 in the city of Sumy, then in the Soviet Union. He studied at School № 20 in Sumy and the A. S. Makarenko Sumy State Pedagogical University, where he graduated in 1993 with a degree in geography and biology. He graduated from the National Academy for Public Administration, with a focus on Public Development Management. Medunytsia was a leading member of the Revolution on Granite, participating in the hunger strike of students in Kyiv, Ukraine's capital, alongside other future People's Deputies.

He worked as a teacher from 1993 to 1999. He founded Union Ukrainian Youth of Sumy Oblast (from 1991). He served as the head of the Ukrainian Youth Union Sumschyna from 1998–2000. He was the head of Sumy Oblast committee of youth organizations (1998).

From 1994 to 1998 he was a deputy of the Sumy City Council. From 1994 to 2001 he was a member of the Congress of Ukrainian Nationalists.

In 1999 he began working as the Head and Sub-head of Sumy Oblast Committee of Youth organizations.

In 2000 and 2001 he was chairman of the executive committee of the Sumy regional organization of the Reforms and Order Party.

He served as the head of the All Ukrainian Youth Public Organization Youth Nationalist Congress from 2002–2006. In 2005 he became the Deputy head of Sumy Oblast State Administration. During 2006–2008 he worked as head of information management and public relations of Chernshiv Region State Administration. He served as the subhead of Sumy Region State Administration 2008–2010.

In 2010, he became the Head of Sumy Oblast Public organization Policy Analysis Committee. During 2010–2012 more than 340 state purchases were scrutinized in Sumy Region, leading to more than 40 court cases over the abuse of law of Ukraine.

These cases included the building of a Regional mental health center, the purchase of medical equipment for this organization, corruption in road construction and excessive food costs at education establishments of Sumy Oblast.

He is the author of numerous articles at home and in the central press.

- At the Parliamentary Elections in 2012 he was elected a people’s deputy of Ukraine for district 157 on the list of Batkivshchyna (as a member of Reforms and Order).
- At the Parliamentary Elections in 2014 he was elected a people’s deputy of Ukraine from the party «People’s Front» for district 157.

He was a member of the Verhovna Rada of Ukraine Committee on budget matters. Drafts of bills sent include: «About television and radio broadcasting» which provides a contingent of 50% for Ukrainian authors and singers, not less than 75% of which should be in Ukrainian.

In the 2019 Ukrainian parliamentary election he failed to get reelected in district 157 as an independent candidate.

In the 2020 Ukrainian local elections he was elected member of the Sumy Oblast Council for European Solidarity.

In December 2022 Medunytsia was unanimously elected as the head of the OUN-B.

== Awards ==
- Ministry of Ukraine «For the contribution of the youth into the state’s development» (2000).
- Department badge of honor of the Security Service of Ukraine Cross of Valour of the second degree.
