= Stepan Lenkavskyi =

Ukrainian nationalist politician and journalist (1904–1977)

- Степан Ленкавський
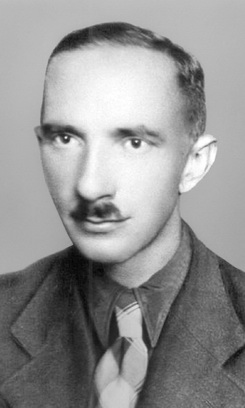

2nd Leader of the OUN (Bandera)
- In office 1959–1968
- Preceded by: Stepan Bandera
- Succeeded by: Yaroslav Stetsko

Personal details
- Born: 6 July 1904 Galicia and Lodomeria, Austria-Hungary (now Ukraine)
- Died: 30 October 1977 (aged 73) Munich, Bavaria, West Germany
- Education: University of Lviv; Jagiellonian University

Stepan Lenkavskyi (Ukrainian: Степан Ленкавський; 6 July 1904 – 30 October 1977) was a Ukrainian nationalist politician who served as the second leader of the Organisation of Ukrainian Nationalists (Banderite) from 1959 to 1968. Lenkavskyi was a follower of Ukrainian nationalism from an early age, and was a founding member of the OUN. He wrote The Decalogue of a Ukrainian Nationalist and co-wrote the Act of restoration of the Ukrainian state before being imprisoned by the Gestapo and at one point being sent to Auschwitz concentration camp. After the death of Stepan Bandera, he served as head of the OUN (B) before resigning and continuing to serve as a writer for the organisation's organs.

== Early life and career ==
Stepan Lenkavskyi was born on 6 July 1904 in Austria-Hungary's Kingdom of Galicia and Lodomeria. His exact birth of place has been disputed: the Encyclopedia of Ukraine places it at Zahvizdia, while the Encyclopedia of Modern Ukraine claims it was Uhornyky. From an early age, he was an active supporter of Ukrainian nationalism, being involved in underground student groups. He studied at both the University of Lviv and Jagiellonian University in Kraków. He was a member of the Union of Ukrainian Nationalist Youth, and eventually became part of its executive council.

== OUN career ==
Lenkavskyi was a founding member of the Organisation of Ukrainian Nationalists, and wrote The Decalogue of a Ukrainian Nationalist, one of the OUN's most important documents. He has been described by the government of Volyn Oblast as being the "main ideologist" of the OUN. He was arrested by Polish police in 1931 and sentenced to four years imprisonment.

When World War II began, rather than continuing to support OUN leader Andriy Melnyk, Lenkavskyi instead chose to join Stepan Bandera's OUN. After Operation Barbarossa began, Lenkavskyi, by then known as a veteran of the Ukrainian nationalist movement, supported the Lviv pogroms, saying on 18 July 1941, "As for Jews, we are taking all measures leading to their extermination." Lenkavskyi also co-wrote the Act of restoration of the Ukrainian state, and was arrested by the Gestapo for attempting to take control of an OUN publishing house in Kraków. He would remain imprisoned until 1944, including at Auschwitz concentration camp.

== After World War II ==
Following his release, Lenkavskyi moved to Kraków and later to Munich. There, after the assassination of Bandera, Lenkavskyi was appointed as leader of the OUN. In this capacity, he focused on the history and ideology of Ukrainian nationalism, giving lectures to OUN members. He eventually chose to resign from his position, being succeeded by Yaroslav Stetsko.

After his resignation, Lenkavskyi continued to edit the OUN's newspaper, Way of Victory. During his later years, he also developed an interest in Chinese and Indian philosophy, as well as the biographies of certain European philosophers such as Immanuel Kant, Arthur Schopenhauer, and Hryhorii Skovoroda. He eventually died on 30 October 1977 in Munich, and was buried in the Munich Waldfriedhof alongside Bandera.
