= The Decalogue of a Ukrainian Nationalist =

1929 brochure by Stepan Lenkavskyi

The Decalogue of a Ukrainian Nationalist, also known as The Ten Commandments of the Ukrainian Nationalists, was the OUN's statement of principles, written by one of the founding members, Stepan Lenkavskyi, and first published as an insert in the underground newspaper Surma in 1929. The creation of the Decalogue was largely influenced by the contemporary doctrines of Ukrainian nationalism. The motto of the Decalogue was authored by Roman Tchaikovsky.

== Modern version of the Decalogue ==
1. You will attain a Ukrainian state or perish fighting for it.
2. You will not allow anyone to tarnish the glory or honour of your Nation.
3. Remember the great days of our struggles for liberation.
4. Be proud that you are heir to the fight for the glory of Volodymyr's Trident.
5. Avenge the death of the Great Knights.
6. Do not speak about matters with whomever you can, but only with whom you must.
7. Do not hesitate to carry out the most dangerous of deeds, if the good of the cause so requires.
8. With hatred and ruthless combat you shall confront the enemies of your nation.
9. Neither pleas, nor threats, nor torture or death shall compel you to reveal a secret.
10. You will aspire to expand the power, wealth, and glory of the Ukrainian state.

== Original version ==
In the original version several other sections are different from the modern version and it is not known when exactly the newer version became official. The original version begins with the introduction authored by Roman Tchaikovsky.

"I – the spirit of eternal element, which protected you from the Tatar hordes and placed you on the frontier of two worlds, to create a new life:

1. You will attain a Ukrainian state or perish fighting for it.
2. You will not allow anyone to tarnish the glory or honour of your Nation.
3. Remember the great days of our struggles for liberation.
4. Be proud that you are heir to the fight for the glory of Volodymyr's Trident.
5. Avenge the death of the Great Knights.
6. Do not speak about matters with whomever you can, but only with whom you must.
7. Do not hesitate to commit the greatest crime, if the good of the cause so requires.
8. With hatred and perfidy you shall confront the enemies of your nation.
9. Neither pleas, nor threats, torture or death will force you to reveal a secret.
10. You will aspire to expand the power, wealth, glory and area of the Ukrainian state, even by means of enslaving others."

== Adoption by the Organization of Ukrainian Nationalists ==
The Organization of Ukrainian Nationalists (the OUN) adopted the Decalogue in 1929, and all members of the Organization were expected to adhere to it. Interpretations of the Decalogue were included in numerous ideological training documents of the Organization of Ukrainian Nationalists — Bandera faction (the OUN-B) from 1940-1945, which appeared under the title of Decalogue Explanations. These documents explained in detail the values that Ukrainian nationalists should follow on a day-to-day basis.

== See also ==
- Hutu Ten Commandments
- Organisation of Ukrainian Nationalists
