= Mykola Stsiborskyi =

Ukrainian politician (1897–1941)

- Микола Сціборський
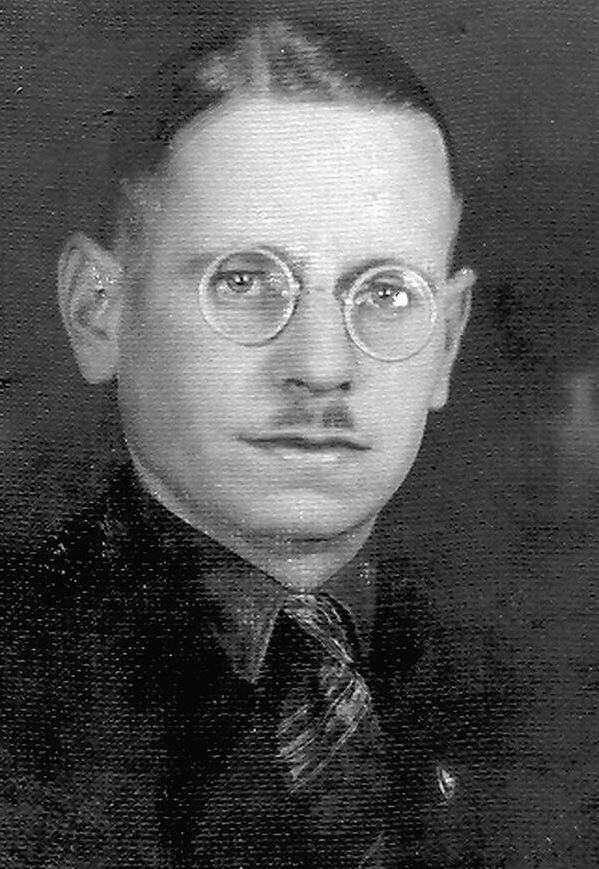
- Born: March 28, 1897; Zhytomyr, Volhynian Governorate, Russian Empire
- Died: August 30, 1941 (aged 44); Zhytomyr, Reichskommissariat Ukraine
- Cause of death: Assassination by gunshot
- Military career
- Allegiance: Russian Empire; Ukraine
- Branch: Imperial Russian Army; Ukrainian People's Army
- Service years: until 1917; 1917–1922
- Rank: Lieutenant colonel Lieutenant
- Other work: Cofounded the League of Ukrainian Nationalists and the OUN

Mykola Orestovych Stsiborskyi (Ukrainian: Микола Орестович Сціборський; (Note: Pseudonyms: Zhytomyrsky, Orhansky, Rokosh.) March 28, 1897 – August 30, 1941) was a Ukrainian nationalist politician who served on the Provid, the émigré leadership of the Organization of Ukrainian Nationalists (OUN), and who became its chief theorist.

He sided with Andriy Melnyk when the OUN split into two hostile factions and was assassinated in 1941, probably by followers of Melnyk's rival Stepan Bandera.

== Biography ==
Mykola Stsiborskyi was born in Zhytomyr, Volhynian Governorate, to the family of a tsarist army officer. He grew up in Kiev. During the First World War, Stsiborskyi served as a lieutenant in a Russian life-grenadier regiment where he was poisoned by gas, twice wounded, and awarded several medals.

Following the February Revolution and the onset of the Ukrainian War of Independence Stsiborskyi joined a cavalry unit of the Ukrainian People's Army (UNA) in 1917, serving as a captain under Symon Petliura. Between 1920 and 1922 he was interned by the Poles in Kalisz, alongside other UNA soldiers, where he received special training and was promoted to the rank of lieutenant colonel.

=== Interwar political activities (1922–1941) ===
In 1924, Stsiborskyi emigrated to Czechoslovakia where, despite not having completed gymnasium, he studied economics and engineering at the Ukrainian Husbandry Academy in Poděbrady. He cofounded the League of Ukrainian Nationalists in 1925 and became a member of the Leadership of Ukrainian Nationalists (hereon the PUN or the Provid) in charge of organizational affairs the following year, which was set up to coordinate work on establishing a single nationalist organization. In February 1929, the League of Ukrainian Nationalists cofounded the Organization of Ukrainian Nationalists (OUN) with Stsiborskyi serving as chairman of its First Grand Congress, held in Vienna, and being elected second-in-command to Yevhen Konovalets. The PUN became the OUN's executive command in exile. Stsiborskyi received his degree in April, for which he had written a thesis on the "Agrarian policy of Ukrainian nationalism" that his advisor, Oleksandr Mytsiuk, described as being written "in the spirit of Mussolinism", remarking on his supposed "imperialistic dream" for the necessary "powerful expansion of colonial nature to the Near East".

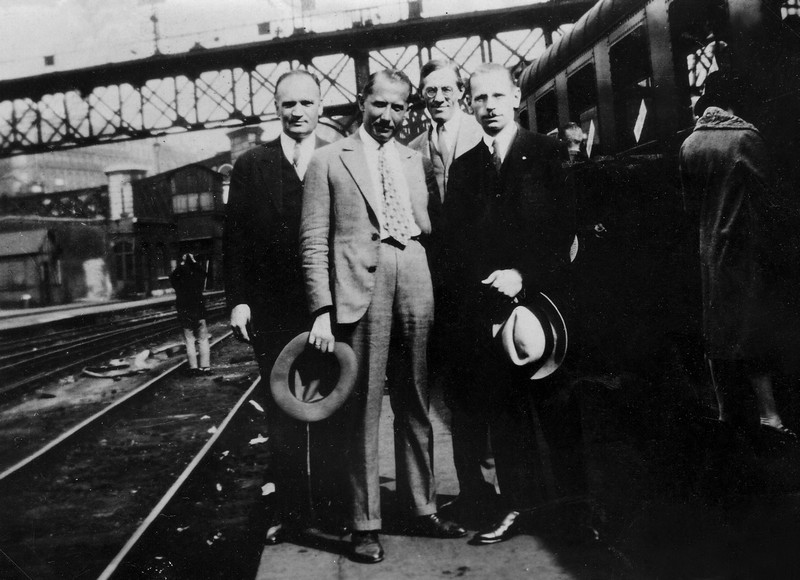
Stsiborskyi (first row, right) next to Konovalets; Paris, 1929

From 1930, Stsiborskyi lived in Paris where he organized the OUN branches for Western and Central Europe. He emerged as a leading theorist within the OUN, contributing articles to Ukraïnske slovo (Ukrainian Word; 1933–1940) and the Provid's ideological journal Rozbudova natsiï (Building the Nation; 1928–1934) among others. A Czechoslovak citizen, Stsiborskyi served as the formal publisher of Rozbudova natsiï out of Prague. He regularly encountered difficulties with the French police who imposed travel restrictions on him.

Stsiborksyi, who had already been married once or twice, married a Jewish woman in 1934 who he had known in Zhytomyr before 1917 and who had three children from a previous marriage. This caused tension within the OUN and when he complained to Konovalets about members who objected to his marriage, Konovalets responded:

"If nationalism is waging war against mixed marriages insofar as conquerors (especially Poles and Russians) are concerned, then it cannot bypass the problem of mixed marriages with Jews, who are indisputably if not greater, then at least comparable, foes of our rebirth. If we require that rank-and-file members observe the principles that we have proclaimed, then we cannot thereby make exceptions for ourselves... Your action has greatly encumbered the organization."

In 1935, Stsiborskyi published the book Natsiokratiia (a neologism literally translating to Nationocracy and sometimes translated as Ethnocracy) that attempted to create a comprehensive concept of the state system and adapt it into a program for the OUN. Following the assassination of Konovalets by the NKVD in May 1938, he headed the Ideological and Political Commission of the August 1939 Second Great Congress of Ukrainian Nationalists that elected Andriy Melnyk as leader of the OUN and broadly adopted Stsiborksyi's draft state system presented in Natsiokratiia. On Melnyk's direction in late 1939, and at the request of Abwehr chief Wilhelm Canaris, Stsiborskyi prepared a draft constitution for a west Ukrainian state which was completed in 1940 and encompassed the establishment of an "authoritarian and totalitarian state" under a vozhd.

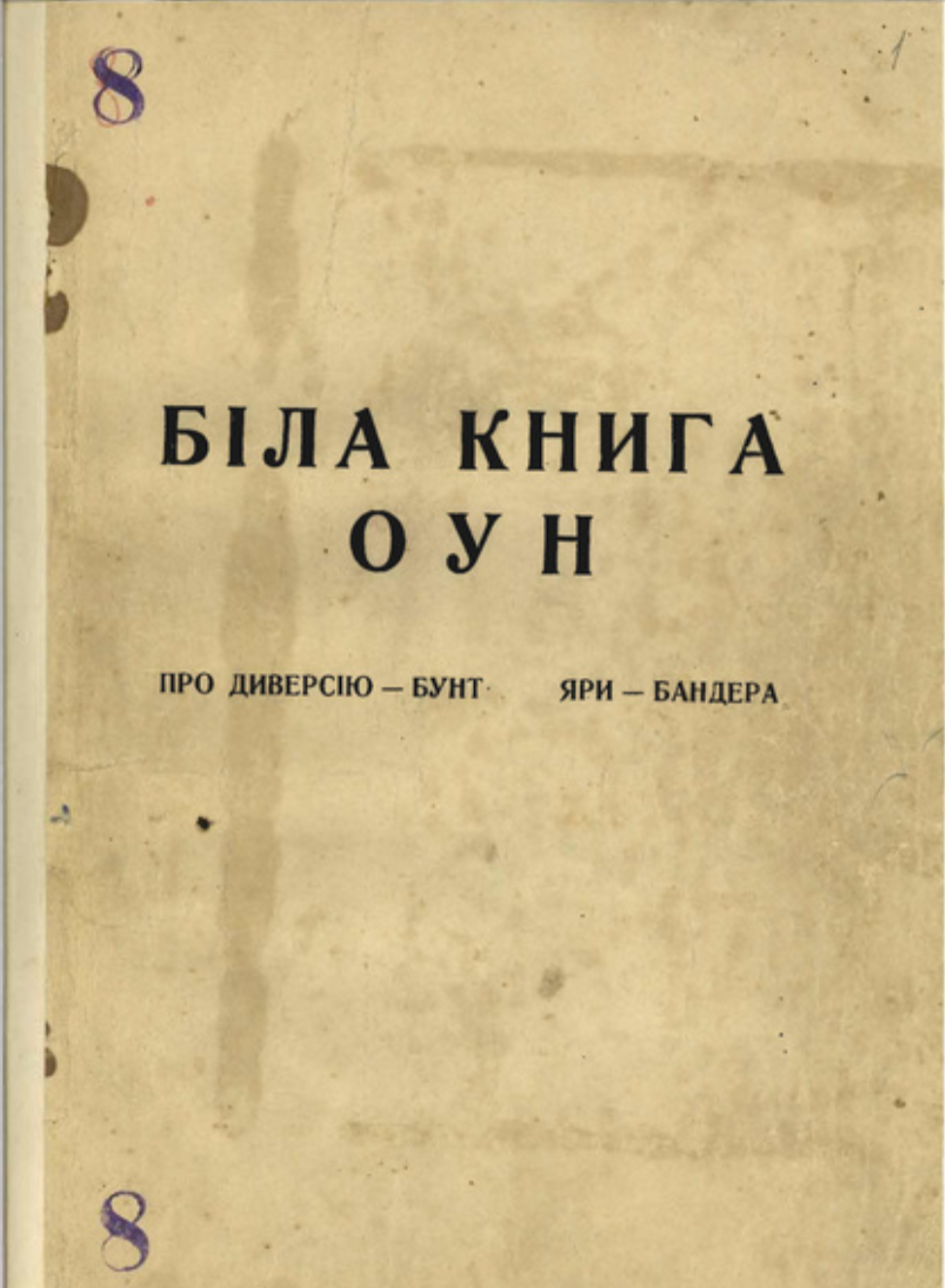
Cover of the 1940 white book

Stsiborksyi moved to Kraków in late 1939 to run a clandestine OUN political training school and sided with the Melnykite faction (hereon the OUN(m)) in the 1940 split in the OUN. Prior to the split, Stepan Bandera and his entourage had demanded that Stsiborskyi and two others be removed from the Provid and replaced with members of the younger generation. They cited an incident where Stsiborskyi had purportedly engaged in a debate in passing with a Communist agent that had attempted to recruit him as well as his sister that lived in the Ukrainian SSR as evidence that he was compromised by the NKVD. Bandera's demands were rejected by Melnyk.

In an August 1940 letter addressed to Melnyk, Bandera stated that he would accept the colonel's authority if he removed traitors from the PUN, especially Stsiborskyi whom he lambasted for possessing an absence of "morality and ethics in family life" and for marrying a "suspicious" Russian-Jewish woman. In late 1940, Stsiborskyi published a white book in response on the "Yary-Bandera diversion-rebellion" (Bila knyha OUN: Pro dyversiiu-bunt Iary-Bandera) in which he recited the course of correspondence and rebuked the Banderites' allegations. Bandera was portrayed as a puppet of Richard Yary who had pocketed OUN funds and who had been scheming against the Provid for over a decade.

=== Second World War ===
Stsiborskyi and fellow Provid member Omelyan Senyk organized and led the first OUN(m) expeditionary groups that penetrated into Central and Eastern Ukraine during the German invasion of the Soviet Union. In mid-August 1941, the pair met with Taras Bulba-Borovets in Lviv and agreed to send him a number of trained officers for the UPA-Polissian Sich. (Note: Though sharing the same name, this is a different UPA to the one formed later under the OUN(b) in October 1942.) Stsiborskyi and Senyk arrived in Zhytomyr in late August where the OUN(m) had set up its main center of activity in occupied-Ukraine. The further expeditionary groups were to be led by Oleh Olzhych who had travelled with the pair.

=== Assassination ===
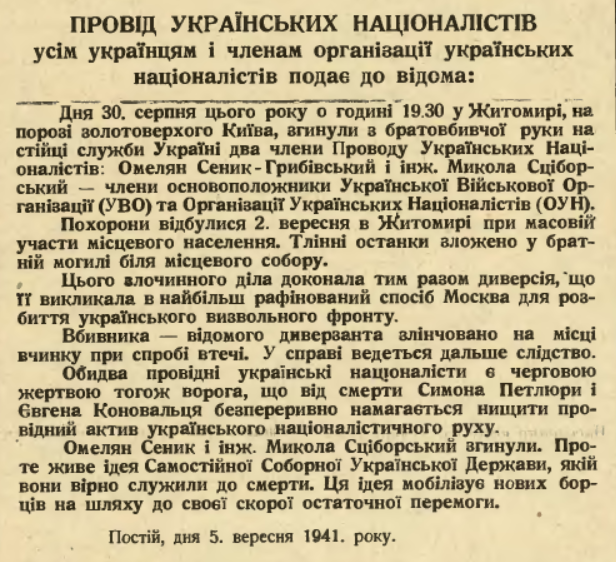
Obituary in Nastup (September 5, 1941)

As Stsiborskyi and Senyk were returning from a gathering of the regional police on the evening of August 30, Stepan Koziy, a member of the OUN(b) and a former Communist, approached them from behind and fired two or three shots. Senyk was shot in the back of the neck and died instantly while Stsiborskyi was shot through both cheeks and bled to death a few hours later.

Koziy was shot and killed by Ukrainian and German police as he tried to flee. In the immediate aftermath, Melnykites accused the OUN(b) of having ordered the murders while Bandera followers distributed leaflets justifying them. As a result of the killings, tensions between the two OUN factions dramatically increased and the German authorities initiated a wider crackdown on the OUN(b).

== Ideology ==
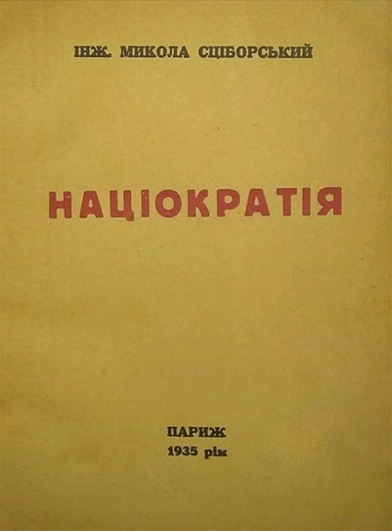
Cover of Natsiokratiia

In his 1935 book Natsiokratiia, Stsiborskyi presented a political-state concept and socio-economic order that was to be advocated by "organized Ukrainian nationalism". According to historian Franziska Bruder, the book contained the OUN's "most important ideological cornerstones". Historian Oleksandr Zaitsev describes the book as developing and radicalizing the ideas of fellow Provid member and ideologue Dmytro Andriievsky in "an attempt to create a Ukrainian model of totalitarianism with a one-party system, the ideological monopoly of the OUN, the almost unlimited power of the "Leader of the Nation", etc." According to historian Taras Kurylo, it advocated the organization of a future Ukrainian state on the principles of authoritarianism, corporatism, and solidarism closely resembling those of Fascist Italy.

Stsiborskyi presented Natsiokratiia as an alternative regime to the permanent fascist dictatorship, intending it to replace a transitional national dictatorship once that had fulfilled its tasks. He argued that there was no example in history of a dictatorship that was "productive after serving the purpose for which it had been created". Stsiborskyi envisaged a republican system without political parties where people would be elected to a State Council by universal secret ballot. Zaitsev considers it "quite likely" that natsiokratiia would have become a "variant of the totalitarian system" had it been implemented.

Bruder argues that Stsiborskyi coined the term natsiokratiia as a sleight of hand to demonstrate the OUN's ideological originality and independence, asserting that this was the only reason the Ukrainian nationalists did not call themselves "fascists".

Stsiborskyi attempted to reconcile two contradictory elements of the OUN's ideology: imperialism and solidarity with the liberation movements of the Soviet Union. He argued that Ukraine should act as a protector of the independent existence and development of these peoples, thus becoming the leader of an East European bloc consisting of satellite states.

In contrast to National Socialist racial discourse, Stsiborskyi argued that someone belonged to the elite based not on their origin but rather if one possesses a "healthy mind, a tough character, is active, and has high-quality creative abilities". He also criticized Dmytro Dontsov in his personal correspondence, referring to him in 1934 as a "swindler, panic-monger, and morally spineless speculator". In a 1940 book titled Ukraine and Russia, Stsiborskyi claimed that: "Had this anti-Russian front been initiated, not by Germany, Italy and Japan, but by England, France and the United States, Ukrainian nationalists would have supported these countries".

== Views ==
=== Fascism ===
Grzegorz Rossoliński-Liebe describes Stsiborskyi, alongside fellow ideologue Yevhen Onatsky, as "adherents of fascism" and the main propagators of fascism within the OUN. Historian Marek Wojnar instead considers Stsiborskyi to fall into the 'radical right' classification in Stanley G. Payne's categorisation of authoritarian nationalist groups that divides them into fascism, radical right, and conservative authoritarian right. (Note: In Payne's categorisation, the 'radical right' generally wished to destroy the existing political system of liberalism and often deliberately blurred the distinction between themselves and fascism, though were less revolutionary relative to fascists.)

Stsiborskyi commended fascism for its concern with national development and its hostility to communism, which he described as an "absolute evil" intent on destroying national communities. According to Zaitsev, Stsiborskyi "wrote with reverence about fascism and its historical merits" and argued that fascism should become a guide for subjugated peoples. However, Stsiborskyi also criticized the fascist permanent dictatorship for its excessive statism and the cult of the police state, asserting that this hindered the development of society and individuals. He maintained that Ukrainian nationalism ought not to "limit its creativity to mechanical copying of foreign models" and contended that the future Ukrainian state should be "neither fascist, nor national-socialist, nor 'Primo-de-Riverist".

=== Jews ===
In a 1930 Rozbudova natsiï article titled Ukrainian Nationalism and Jewry, Stsiborskyi criticized Ukrainian society for widespread antisemitism and for not questioning the reasons for what he viewed as negative characteristics of Jews. Stsiborskyi asserted that Ukrainian Jews were initially indifferent to the Ukrainian national movement and that their attitudes had only changed radically after the start of the pogroms. He argued in favor of a compromise with the Jews in order to enlist their support or at least secure their neutrality in the struggle against Poland and the Soviet Union.

In the next issue, Rozbudova natsiï began publishing a series of particularly antisemitic articles by Oleksandr Mytsiuk (Note: Mytsiuk had previously been a minister in the government of the Directorate and was a professor at the Ukrainian Free University in Prague. He was not a member of the Ukrainian Military Organization nor the OUN.) that sought to dismantle every point Stsiborskyi had made. Stsiborskyi threatened Rozbudova natsiï editor Volodymyr Martynets with a "revolution" and wrote to Konovalets objecting to Mytsiuk's articles. Konovalets responded in agreement, saying he had reprimanded Martynets.

According to Kurylo, Stsiborskyi abandoned this position in the late 1930s, "very likely" due to pressure from within the OUN. In 1938, he advocated the expulsion of "alien ethnic elements"— Kurylo considers this to refer to Poles, Jews, and Russians. The constitution he drafted for the Abwehr in 1940 singled out Jews for ambiguous citizenship laws. In contrast to other Melnykite publications, the 1940 white book that Stsiborskyi prepared on the split in the OUN avoided invoking antisemitic attacks against Richard Yary.

== Selected works ==
- Stsiborskyi, Mykola (1935). Natsiokratiia (in Ukrainian). Paris: [n.p.]
- Stsiborskyi, Mykola (1940). Bila knyha OUN: Pro dyversiiu-bunt Iary-Bandera [OUN White Book: On the Yary-Bandera Diversion-Rebellion] (in Ukrainian).

== See also ==
- Ivan Mitrynha

== Bibliography ==
- Armstrong, John (1963). Ukrainian Nationalism (2nd ed.). New York: Columbia University Press.
- Bruder, Franziska (2007). "Den ukrainischen Staat erkämpfen oder sterben!" Die Organisation ukrainischer Nationalisten (OUN) 1929–1948 ["Fight for the Ukrainian State or Die!" The Organisation of Ukrainian Nationalists (OUN) 1929–1948] (in German). Berlin: Metropol Verlag.
- Carynnyk, Marco (2011). "Foes of our rebirth: Ukrainian nationalist discussions about Jews, 1929–1947". Nationalities Papers. 39 (3): 315–352. doi:10.1080/00905992.2011.570327.
- Horelov, Mykola (1996). "Ethnocratic Concepts". In Derhachov, Oleksandr (ed.). Ukrainian Statehood in the Twentieth Century: Historical and Political Analysis. Kyiv: Political Thought. pp. 39–52. ISBN 978-966-543-040-7.
- Kurylo, Taras (2014). "The 'Jewish Question' in the Ukrainian Nationalist Discourse of the Inter-War Period". In Petrovsky-Shtern Y., Polonsky A. (ed.). Polin: Studies in Polish Jewry Volume 26: Jews and Ukrainians. Liverpool University Press, Littman Library of Jewish Civilisation. pp. 233–258. doi:10.2307/j.ctv2vr8vjf. ISBN 978-1-906764-19-7. JSTOR j.ctv2vr8vjf.
- Payne, Stanley G. (1980). Fascism: Comparison and Definition. Madison, WI: University of Wisconsin Press.
- Rossoliński-Liebe, Grzegorz (2014). Stepan Bandera: The Life and Afterlife of a Ukrainian Nationalist. Fascism, Genocide, and Cult. Stuttgart: Ibidem Press. ISBN 978-3-8382-0604-2.
- Shkandrij, Myroslav (2015). Ukrainian Nationalism: Politics, Ideology, and Literature, 1929-1956. New Haven: Yale University Press.
- Struve, Kai (2012). "Rites of Violence? The Pogroms of Summer 1941". In Bartal I.; Polonsky A.; Ury S. (eds.). Polin: Studies in Polish Jewry Volume 24: Jews and their Neighbours in Eastern Europe since 1750. Liverpool University Press, Littman Library of Jewish Civilisation.
- Wojnar, Marek (16 December 2020). Andrii Melnyk ta ioho rukh: istoriia, pamiat, spadshchyna [Andriy Melnyk and his movement: History, memory, legacy] (roundtable) (in Ukrainian). Center for Interethnic Relations Research in Eastern Europe – via YouTube. English subtitles.
- Wysocki, Roman (2003). Organizacja ukraińskich nacjonalistów w Polsce w latach 1929-1939: geneza, struktura, program, ideologia [The Organisation of Ukrainian Nationalists in Poland in 1929-1939: Genesis, Structure, Programme, Ideology] (in Polish). Lublin: UMCS Publishing House.
- Zaitsev, Oleksandr (2014). "Ukrainskyi intehralnyi natsionalizm (1920-1930-ti roky): heneza, evoliutsiia, porivnialnyi analiz" [Ukrainian integral nationalism (1920s-1930s): Genesis, evolution, comparative analysis] (PDF) (in Ukrainian). PhD diss., National Academy of Sciences of Ukraine. Archived from the original on 2024-09-14.
