= Zahvizdia rural hromada =

Hromada in Ivano-Frankivsk Oblast, Ukraine

Zahvizdia rural hromada Загвіздянська сільська громада
- hromada
- Location within Ivano-Frankivsk Oblast Location within Ukraine
- Coordinates: 48°55′21″N 24°39′17″E
- Country: Ukraine
- Oblast: Ivano-Frankivsk Oblast
- Raion: Ivano-Frankivsk Raion
- Administrative center: Zahvizdia

Area
  - Total: 313 km^{2} (121 sq mi)

Population
  - Total: 5,885
- Villages: 2
- Website: zahvizdyanska-gromada.gov.ua

Zahvizdia rural hromada (Ukrainian: Загвіздянська сільська громада) is a hromada in Ukraine, in Ivano-Frankivsk Raion of Ivano-Frankivsk Oblast. The administrative center is the village of Zahvizdia.

== Settlements ==
The hromada consists of 2 villages: Zahvizdia, Pidlissia.
