= League of Ukrainian Nationalists =

League of Ukrainian Nationalists Леґія українських націоналістів
- President: Mykola Stsiborskyi
- Founded: 12 November 1925
- Dissolved: 1929
- Merger of: Ukrainian National Alliance; Union of Ukrainian Fascists; Union for the Liberation of Ukraine
- Merged into: Organisation of Ukrainian Nationalists
- Headquarters: Poděbrady
- Ideology: Ukrainian nationalism Ukrainian irredentism Anti-communism; Antisemitism; Anti-Russian sentiment Anti-Polish sentiment

The League of Ukrainian Nationalists (Ukrainian: Леґія українських націоналістів, romanized: Legiia ukrainskykh natsionalistiv or ЛУН, LUN) was a Ukrainian nationalist organisation created in Poděbrady on 12 November 1925 out of three groups, the Ukrainian National Alliance, the Union of Ukrainian Fascists, and the Union for the Liberation of Ukraine.

The LUN existed during four years before rejoining in 1929 the Organisation of Ukrainian Nationalists. The president of LUN was Mykola Stsiborskyi.

== Foundation ==
LUN was founded on 12 November 1925, at the unifying congress of three Ukrainian organisations:

- Ukrainian National Association in Czechoslovakia (Mykola Stsiborskyi, Dmytro Demchuk and others)
- Union for the Liberation of Ukraine (Yuriy Collard, Hryhorovych)
- Union of Ukrainian Fascists (Petro Kozhevnykiv, Leonid Kostariv)

== Sources ==
- Roman Malko, "Music from the shadows", Zerkalo Nedeli, September 14–20, 2002. in Russian, in Ukrainian.
- Hiroaki Kuromiya, The Voices of the Dead - Stalin's Great Terror in the 1930s, Yale University Press, New Haven and London, 2007, ISBN 0300123892.
