= Tetiana Skrypka =

Ukrainian politician (born 1984)

- Тетяна Скрипка
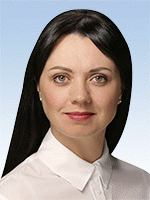
- Skrypkat, 2019

People's Deputy of Ukraine
- Incumbent
- Assumed office 29 August 2019
- Preceded by: Oleh Medunytsia
- Constituency: Sumy Oblast, No. 157

Personal details
- Born: Tetiana Vasylivna Riabukha; 31 December 1984 (age 41) Sumy, Ukrainian SSR, Soviet Union
- Party: Servant of the People
- Other political affiliations: Independent
- Education: Sumy Pedagogical University

Tetiana Vasylivna Skrypka (Ukrainian: Тетяна Василівна Скрипка; née Riabukha; born 31 December 1984) is a Ukrainian politician currently serving as a People's Deputy of Ukraine from Ukraine's 157th electoral district since 29 August 2019. She is a member of Servant of the People.

== Early life and career ==
Tetiana Vasylivna Riabukha was born on 31 December 1984 in the city of Sumy, in northern Ukraine. She is a graduate of the Sumy Pedagogical University, specialising in education and primary education. She is currently studying administrative management since 2018.

Prior to her election, Skrypka was a teacher of primary classes in Sumy's Specialised Grade School No. 10 for Grades 1-3. She was also director of health camps "Zorianyi" KP and "Shliakhrembud" SMR.

== Political career ==
During the 2019 Ukrainian presidential election, Skrypka was part of Volodymyr Zelenskyy's campaign.

Skrypka was a successful candidate in the 2019 Ukrainian parliamentary election, running for the position of People's Deputy of Ukraine in Ukraine's 157th electoral district as the candidate of Servant of the People. At the time of the election, she was an independent living in Sumy. In the Verkhovna Rada (Ukraine's parliament), she joined the Verkhovna Rada Humanitarian and Informational Policy Committee, becoming head of the Subcommittee on Family and Children.

Skrypka was a candidate for mayor of Sumy in the 2020 Ukrainian local elections.
