= Organisation of Ukrainian Nationalists =

Political organization

Organisation of Ukrainian Nationalists Організація українських націоналістів
- Historic leaders: Andriy Melnyk (conservative) (Note: In that they adhered more closely to the initial principles of the OUN relative to the Banderites.); Stepan Bandera (radical)
- Allegiance: Ukr. national gov't (c. 1941); Ukr. Supreme Liberation Council
- Founded: February 2, 1929; 97 years ago; Vienna, Republic of Austria
- Preceded by: Ukrainian Military Organization; League of Ukrainian Nationalists
- Newspaper: Ideia i Chyn (journal; 1942–46)
- Security agency: Sluzhba Bezpeky (SB OUN)
- Armed wing: Ukrainian Insurgent Army (UPA)
- Allies: Kingdom of Romania (Note: After the Soviet occupation of Northern Bukovina, the local OUN branch engaged in active resistance against the Soviet authorities. The Soviet authorities alleged that they were backed by Romania. In 1941, when the territory became again part of Romania, Romanian Prime Minister Ion Antonescu tried to integrate them into the local Romanian Gendarmerie troops, but the OUN fighters refused and engaged in armed struggle against the Romanian authorities.); Nazi Germany (Note: Prior to the end of 1941, both factions of the OUN pursued an alliance the Nazi regime - often fighting with each other to win the favor of Germany. However, no formal alliance was signed, and collaboration remained largely informal. OUN members joined collaborationist police regiments and anti-partisan formations. In 1941, the OUN-B and OUN-M both publicly declared the German occupiers to be their allies. In 1942, this arrangement collapsed as the Nazis began arresting leaders of the OUN en masse. In 1944, the collaborations between the OUN and Nazi Germany were restarted, and many Ukrainian nationalists joined the 14th Waffen Grenadier Division of the SS (1st Galician), which the OUN-M leadership was involved in organizing.)
- Opponents: Republic of Poland; Soviet Union; Kingdom of Romania; Nazi Germany (Note: Starting in early 1942, the Germans began arresting leading members of the OUN, focusing on the OUN-B. The Germans sought out more moderate nationalist factions to collaborate with during the initial phases of the occupation. As the occupation wore on, OUN members were directed to desert the collaborationist police forces and join the UPA to fight the Germans. In early 1944, as the Nazis faced defeat in Ukraine, both sides renewed their collaboration. OUN and UPA leaders were released from prison, members joined the 14th Waffen Grenadier Division of the SS, and participated in battles with the Soviets and mass killings of Jews and Poles.)
- Membership: approx. 20,000 (1939 est.)
- Ideology: Until 1943: Integral nationalism; From 1943: National democracy
- Political position: De facto: Far-right (Note: The OUN-B claimed to adhere to more centrist, democratic principles from 1943 to 1954. The renunciation of these policies led to a split between the OUN-B and a third group, known as OUN-Z.)
- Part of: Anti-Bolshevik Bloc of Nations
- Slogan: "Glory to Ukraine!"
- Anthem: "March of Ukrainian Nationalists"
- Major actions: Massacres of Poles in Volhynia and Eastern Galicia; Creation of the Kolky Republic
- Notable attacks: Killing of Bronisław Pieracki; OUN Uprising of 1939; Killing of Nikolai Vatutin
- Battles and wars: See complete list: (Note: Snyder writes: "In July 1930, Ukrainian nationalists began sabotage actions in Galicia, destroying Polish properties and homes throughout the region in hundreds of terrorist actions. In September, Piłsudski ordered the pacification of Galicia, sending a thousand policemen to search 450 villages for nationalist agitators... "In 1930, as the OUN terrorized the Galician countryside...Volhynia remained comparatively peaceful..."): Pacification in Eastern Galicia; Polish–Ukrainian conflict; Invasion of Carpatho-Ukraine; Soviet–Ukrainian partisan conflict; German–Ukrainian conflict; Operations in Volyn–Polesia; UPA anti-Soviet resistance; Activities of Ukrainian nationalists in Belarus

Website
- https://kmoun.info/ / https://oun.org.ua/

The Organisation of Ukrainian Nationalists (OUN; Ukrainian: Організація українських націоналістів, romanized: Orhanizatsiia ukrainskykh natsionalistiv) was a Ukrainian nationalist organization established on February 2, 1929 in Vienna, uniting the Ukrainian Military Organization with smaller, mainly youth, radical nationalist right-wing groups. The OUN was the largest and one of the most important far-right Ukrainian organizations operating in the interwar period on the territory of the Second Polish Republic. The OUN was mostly active preceding, during, and immediately after the Second World War. The ideology held by the OUN has been characterized by scholars as a Ukrainian form of fascism and/or integral nationalism, itself sometimes characterized as proto-fascist, or more broadly as extreme or radical nationalism influenced by fascist movements. Its ideology was influenced by the writings of Dmytro Dontsov, from 1929 by Italian fascism, and from 1930 by German Nazism. The OUN pursued a strategy of violence, terrorism, and assassinations with the goal of creating an ethnically homogeneous and totalitarian Ukrainian state.

During the Second World War, in 1940, the OUN split into two parts. The older, more moderate members supported Andriy Melnyk's OUN-M, while the younger and more radical members supported Stepan Bandera's OUN-B. On 30 June 1941 OUN-B declared an independent Ukrainian state in Lviv, which had just come under Nazi Germany's control in the early stages of the Axis invasion of the Soviet Union. OUN-B pledged to work closely with Germany, which was described as freeing the Ukrainians from Soviet oppression, and OUN-B members subsequently took part in the Lviv pogroms. In response to the OUN-B declaration of independence, the Nazi authorities suppressed the OUN leadership. Members of the OUN took an active part in the Holocaust in Ukraine and Poland. In October 1942, OUN-B established the Ukrainian Insurgent Army (UPA). (Note: The OUN and UPA were terrorist organisations, relying on terrorist tactics and collaboration with Nazi Germany that favoured the OUN at the expense of more moderate Ukrainian organizations, such as the Ukrainian National Democratic Alliance; not all UPA soldiers were members of the OUN or shared OUN's ideology. The UPA was also responsible for the large-scale ethnic cleansing of Poles during the massacres of Poles in Volhynia and Eastern Galicia and the mass murders of Jews. The OUN also engaged in murders of Jews, such as during the 1941 Lviv pogroms, as well as of Ukrainians during the World War II and post-war anti-Soviet terror campaign in western Ukraine.) In 1943–1944, in an effort to prevent Polish efforts to re-establish prewar borders, UPA units carried out massacres of Poles in Volhynia and Eastern Galicia.

In the course of the war, with the approaching defeat of Nazi Germany, the OUN-B changed its political image, exchanging fascism for democratic slogans. After World War II, the UPA fought Soviet and Polish government forces. In 1947, in Operation Vistula, the Polish government deported 140,000 Ukrainians as part of the population exchange between Poland and Soviet Ukraine. Soviet forces killed 153,000, arrested 134,000, and deported 203,000 UPA members, relatives, and supporters. (Note: Rudling writes: "After the war, the UPA until 1953 continued a hopeless struggle against the Soviet authorities, in which they killed 20,000 Ukrainians. The Soviet authorities killed 153,000 people, arrested 134,000 and deported 203,000 UPA members, sympathizers and their families (Siemaszko, 2010: 93; Motyka, 2006: 649).") During the Cold War, Western intelligence agencies, including the CIA, covertly supported the OUN. In the mid-1950s, the OUN-B split into the broadly social-democratic but short-lived OUN-z and the Dontsovite OUN-r under Bandera. After Ukrainian independence, the OUN-r (also referred to as the OUN-B) set up the Congress of Ukrainian Nationalists party while the OUN-M established itself as a non-governmental organization (having retained the name the 'Organization of Ukrainian Nationalists').

== History ==
=== Background and formation ===
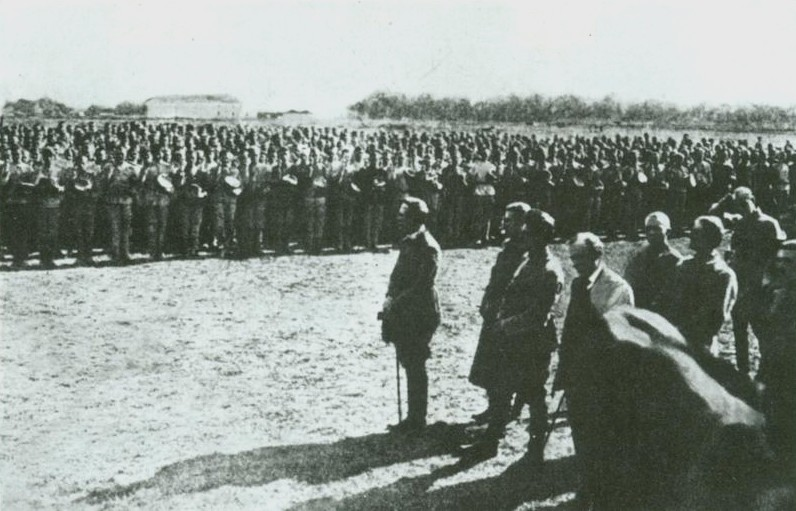
Symon Petliura (center) and Colonel Yevhen Konovalets (to Petliura's right) taking the oath of office of the Sich Riflemen training school in Starokostiantyniv, 1919

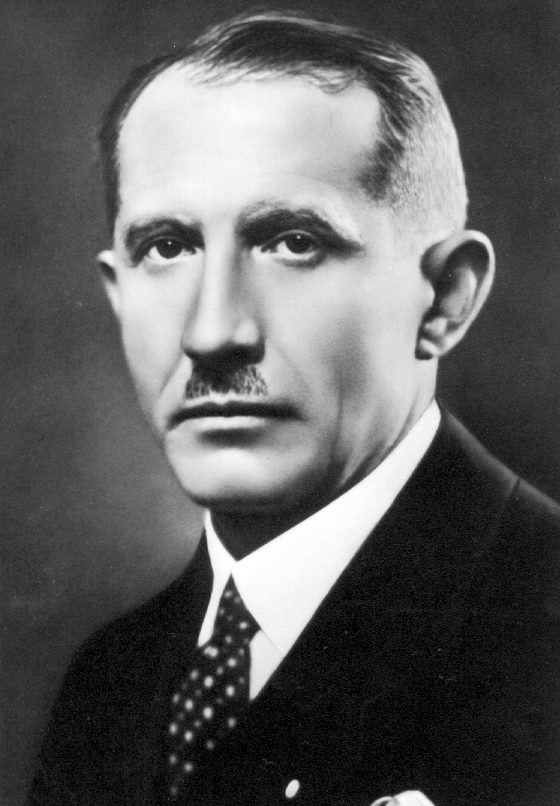
Yevhen Konovalets, the OUN's leader from 1929 to 1938

In 1919, with the end of the Polish–Ukrainian War of 1918 to 1919, the Second Polish Republic took over most of the territory claimed by the West Ukrainian People's Republic and the rest was absorbed by the Soviets. One year later, exiled Ukrainian officers, mostly former Sich Riflemen, founded the Ukrainian Military Organization (Ukrainian: Українська Військова Організація (УВО, romanized: Ukrainska Viiskova Orhanizatsiia (UVO)), an underground military organization with the goal of continuing armed struggle for an independent Ukraine. The UVO was strictly a military organization with a military command-structure. Originally the UVO operated under the authority of the exiled government of the Western Ukrainian People's Republic, but in 1925, following a power struggle, all the supporters of the exiled president Yevhen Petrushevych were expelled from the organization.

The UVO leader, Yevhen Konovalets, had formerly commanded the Sich Riflemen. West Ukrainian political parties secretly funded the organization. The UVO organized a wave of sabotage actions in the second half of 1922, attacking Polish settlers and destroying police-stations, railroad stations, telegraph poles and railroad tracks. An attempt to assassinate Poland's Chief of State Józef Piłsudski in September 1921 failed. In 1922, the UVO organized 17 attacks on Polish officials (killing five) and 15 attacks on Ukrainians (9 of whom died, among them Sydir Tverdokhlib).

The UVO continued this type of activity, albeit on a smaller scale later. When the League of Nations recognized Polish rule over western Ukraine in 1923, many members left the UVO. The Ukrainian legal parties turned against the UVO's militant actions, preferring to work within the Polish political system. As a result, the UVO turned to Germany and Lithuania for political and financial support. It established contact with militant anti-Polish student-organizations, such as the Group of Ukrainian National Youth, the League of Ukrainian Nationalists, and the Union of Ukrainian Nationalist Youth. After preliminary meetings in Berlin in 1927 and in Prague in 1928, at a founding congress in Vienna in 1929 the veterans of the UVO and the student militants met and united to form the Organization of Ukrainian Nationalists (OUN). Although the members consisted mostly of Galician youths, Yevhen Konovalets served as its first leader and its leadership council, the Provid, comprised mostly veterans and was based abroad.

=== Pre-war activities ===
Prior to World War II, the OUN was smaller and less influential among the Ukrainian minority in Poland than the moderate Ukrainian National Democratic Alliance. The OUN sought to infiltrate legal political parties, universities, and other political structures and institutions. (Note: Rudling writes: "OUN founder Evhen Konovalets' (1891–1938) stated that his movement was "waging war against mixed marriages" with Poles, Russians and Jews, the latter of whom he described as "foes of our national rebirth" (Carynnyk, 2011: 315). After Konovalets' was himself assassinated in 1938, the movement split into two wings, the followers of Andrii Melnyk (1890–1964) and Stepan Bandera (1909–1959), known as Melnykites, OUN(m), and Banderites, OUN(b). Both wings enthusiastically committed to the new fascist Europe.") OUN ideology was influenced by several political theorists, such as Dmytro Dontsov, whose political thought was characterised by totalitarianism, national chauvinism, and antisemitism, as well as Mykola Stsiborskyi and Yevhen Onatsky, and Italian fascism and German Nazism. OUN nationalists were trained by Benito Mussolini in Sicily jointly with the Ustase, they also maintained offices in Berlin and Vienna. Before the war, the OUN regarded the Second Polish Republic as an immediate target, but viewed the Soviet Union, although not operating on its territory, as the main enemy and greatest oppressor of the Ukrainian people. Even before the war, impressed by the successes of fascism, OUN radicalised its stance, and it saw Nazi Germany as its main ally in the fight for independence.

In contrast to UNDO, the OUN accepted violence as a political tool against foreign and domestic enemies of their cause. Most of its activity was directed against Polish politicians and government representatives. Under the command of the Western Ukrainian Territorial Executive (established in February 1929), the OUN carried out hundreds of acts of sabotage in Galicia and Volhynia, including a campaign of arson against Polish landowners (which helped provoke the 1930 Pacification), boycotts of state schools and Polish tobacco and liquor monopolies, dozens of expropriation attacks on government institutions to obtain funds for its activities, and assassinations. From 1921 to 1939 UVO and OUN carried out 63 known assassinations: 36 Ukrainians (among them one communist), 25 Poles, 1 Russian and 1 Jew. This number is likely an underestimate because there were likely unrecorded killings in rural regions.

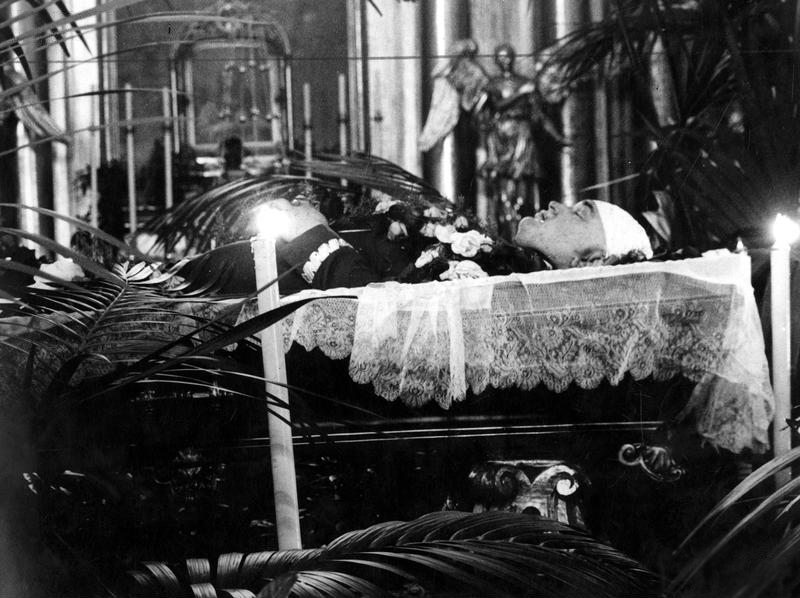
The corpse of Bronisław Pieracki on 18 June 1934

The OUN's victims during this period included Tadeusz Hołówko, a Polish promoter of Ukrainian-Polish compromise, Emilian Czechowski, Lwow's Polish police commissioner, Alexei Mailov, a Soviet consular official killed in retaliation for the Holodomor, and most notably Bronisław Pieracki, the Polish interior minister. The OUN also killed moderate Ukrainian figures such as the respected teacher (and former officer of the Ukrainian Galician Army) Ivan Babii. Most of these killings were organized locally and occurred without the authorization or knowledge of the OUN's emigre leaders abroad. In 1930 OUN members assaulted the head of the Shevchenko Scientific Society Kyryl Studynsky in his office. Such acts were condemned by the head of the Ukrainian Greek Catholic Church, Metropolitan Andriy Sheptytsky, who was particularly critical of the OUN's leadership in exile who inspired acts of youthful violence, writing that they were "using our children to kill their parents" and that "whoever demoralizes our youth is a criminal and an enemy of the people." OUN's terrorist methods, fascination with fascism, rejection of parliamentary democracy and acting against Poland on behalf of Germany did not find support among many other Ukrainian organizations, especially among the Petlurites, i.e. former activists of the Ukrainian People's Republic.

As the Polish state's repressive policies with respect to Ukrainians during the interwar period increased, many Ukrainians (particularly the youth, many of whom felt they had no future) lost faith in traditional legal approaches, in their elders, and in the western democracies who were seen as turning their backs on Ukraine. The young were much more radical, calling for the use of terror in political struggle, but both groups were united by national radicalism and advocacy of a totalitarian system. The leader of the "old" group Andriy Melnyk claimed in a letter sent to the German minister of foreign affairs Joachim von Ribbentrop on 2 May 1939 that the OUN was "ideologically akin to similar movements in Europe, especially to National Socialism in Germany and Fascism in Italy". (Note: In the footnote of p.71, Rossoliński-Liebe cites this letter as being from 1939, not 1938 as it says intext. It appears he made a mistake.) This period of disillusionment coincided with the increase in support for the OUN. By the beginning of the Second World War, the OUN was estimated to have 20,000 active members and many times that number of sympathizers. Many bright students, such as the talented young poets Bohdan Kravtsiv and Olena Teliha were attracted to the OUN's revolutionary message.

As a means to gain independence from Poland and the Soviet Union the OUN accepted material and moral support from Nazi Germany before World War II. The Germans, needing Ukrainian assistance against the Soviet Union, were expected by the OUN to further the goal of Ukrainian independence. Although some elements of the German military were inclined to do so, they were ultimately overruled by Adolf Hitler, whose racial prejudice against the Ukrainians and desires for economic exploitation of Ukraine precluded formal cooperation. The interwar Lithuanian government had particularly close ties with the OUN.

The OUN was active in the Kingdom of Romania as well, advocating for the separation of Bessarabia and Bukovina from Romania and their integration in the future Ukrainian state. According to the OUN-affiliated journalist Dmytro Andrievsky, USSR, Poland and Romania were OUN's main enemies. After the Soviet occupation of Bessarabia and Northern Bukovina, the OUN branch in Northern Bukovina engaged in armed resistance against the Soviet troops. The Soviet authorities alleged that they were backed by Romania.

=== During World War II ===
==== Split in the OUN ====
In September 1939 Poland was invaded and split by Germany and the Soviet Union. On 1 November 1939, Polish territories annexed by the Soviet Union (i.e. Volhynia and Eastern Galicia) were incorporated into the Ukrainian Soviet Socialist Republic. Initially, the Soviet occupation of eastern Poland was met with limited support from the ethnic Ukrainian population. Repression was directed mainly against the ethnic Poles, and the Ukrainisation of education, land reform, and other changes were popular among the Ukrainians. The situation changed in the middle of 1940 when collectivisation began and repressions hit the Ukrainian population. There were 2,779 Ukrainians arrested in 1939, 15,024 in 1940 and 5,500 in 1941, until the German invasion of the Soviet Union.

The situation for ethnic Ukrainians under German occupation was much better. About 550,000 Ukrainians lived in the General Government in the German-occupied portion of Poland, and they were favoured at the expense of Poles. Approximately 20,000 Ukrainian activists escaped from the Soviet occupation to Warsaw or Kraków. In late 1939, Nazi Germany accommodated OUN leaders in the city of Kraków, the capital of the General Government and provided financial support for the OUN. The headquarters of the Ukrainian Central Committee headed by Volodymyr Kubiyovych, the legal representation of the Ukrainian community in the Nazi zone, were also located in Kraków.

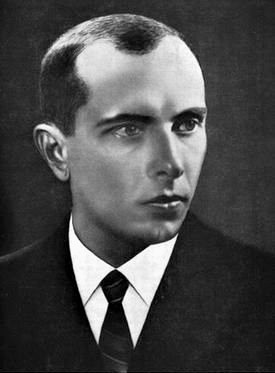
Stepan Bandera

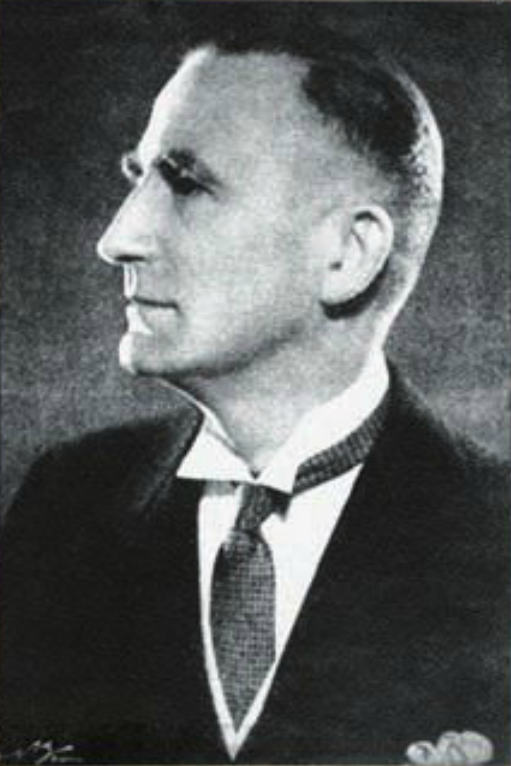
Andriy Melnyk

Despite the differences, the OUN's leader Yevhen Konovalets was able to maintain unity within the organization. Konovalets was assassinated by a Soviet agent, Pavel Sudoplatov, in Rotterdam in May 1938. He was succeeded by Andriy Melnyk, a 48-year-old former colonel in the army of the Ukrainian People's Republic and one of the founders of the UVO. He was chosen to lead the OUN despite not having been involved in activities throughout the 1930s. Melnyk was more friendly to the Church than any of his associates (the OUN was generally anti-clerical), and had even become the chairman of a Ukrainian Catholic youth organization that was regarded as anti-nationalist by many OUN members. His choice was seen as an attempt by the leadership to repair ties with the Church and to become more pragmatic and moderate. However, this direction was opposite to the trend within western Ukraine.

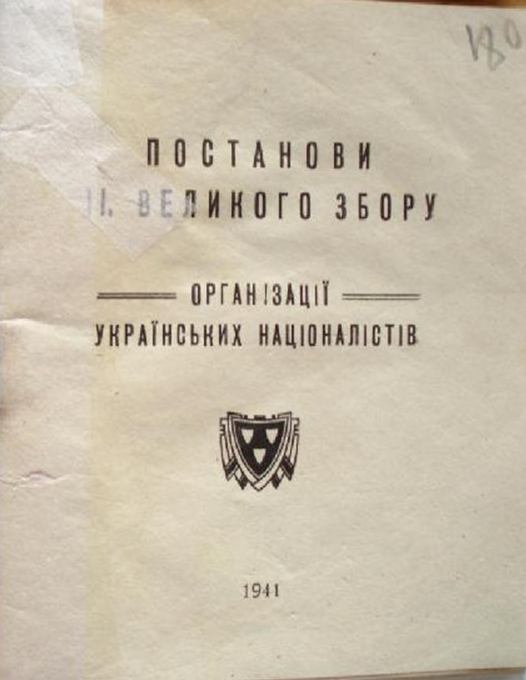
Cover of the OUN-B's Second Grand Congress resolutions (Note: Bandera's Second OUN Conference resolutions legalised the existence of Bandera's OUN. OUN leader Andriy Melnyk denounced it as "saboteur".)

In Kraków on 10 February 1940 a revolutionary faction of the OUN emerged, called the OUN-R or, after its leader Stepan Bandera, the OUN-B (Banderites). This was opposed by the current leadership of the organization, so it split, and the old group was called OUN-M after the leader Andriy Melnyk (Melnykites). The OUN-M dominated Ukrainian emigration and the Bukovina, but in Ukraine itself, the Banderists gained a decisive advantage (60% of the agent network in Volhynia and 80% in Eastern Galicia). Political leader Transcarpathian Ukrainians Avgustyn Voloshyn praised Melnyk as a Christian of European culture, in contrast to many nationalists who placed the nation above God. OUN-M leadership was more experienced and had some limited contacts in Eastern Ukraine; it also maintained contact with German intelligence and the German army.

=== Early years of the war and activities in central and eastern Ukraine ===
Triumphal arches welcoming the Nazi occupation in Western Ukraine.

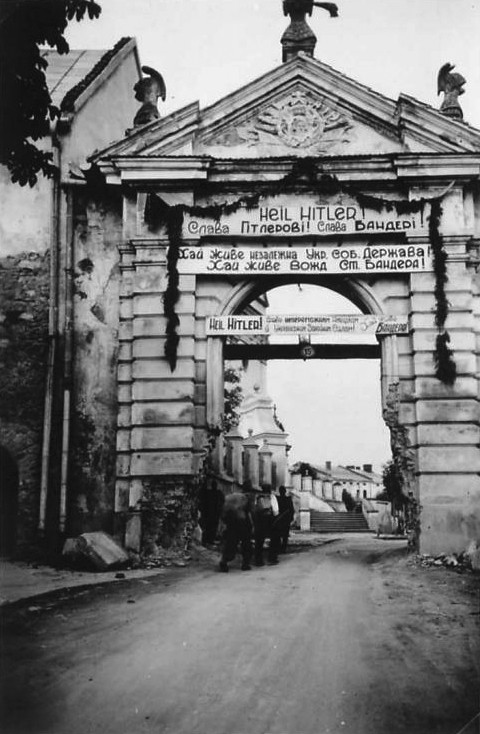
Hlynska Gate, Zhovkva.
In Cyrillic, above: "Glory to Hitler! - Glory to Bandera!", below: "Long live the independent Ukr. Untd. State! Long live the leader St. Bandera!"

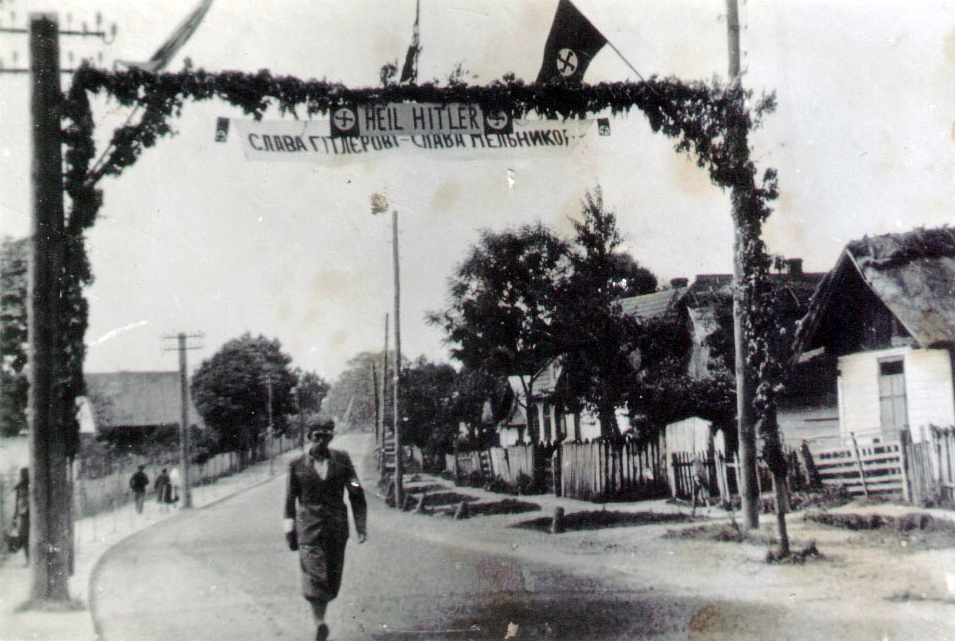
In Cyrillic, "Glory to Hitler! - Glory to Melnyk!"

On 25 February 1941, the head of Abwehr Wilhelm Franz Canaris sanctioned the creation of the "Ukrainian Legion". Ukrainian Nachtigall and Roland battalions were formed under German command and numbered about 800 men. OUN-B expected that it would become the core of the future Ukrainian army. The OUN-B already in 1940 began preparations for an anti-Soviet uprising. However, Soviet repression delayed these plans and more serious fighting did not occur until after the German invasion of the USSR in July 1941. According to OUN-B reports, they then had about 20,000 men grouped in 3,300 locations in Western Ukraine. The NKVD was determined to liquidate the Ukrainian underground. According to Soviet reports, 4435 members were arrested between October 1939 and December 1940. There were public trials and death sentences were carried out. In the first half of 1941, 3073 families (11329 people) of members of the Polish and Ukrainian underground were deported from Eastern Galicia and Volhynia. Soviet repression forced about a thousand members of the Ukrainian underground to take up partisan activities even before the German invasion.

After Germany's invasion of the USSR, on 30 June 1941, OUN seized about 213 villages and organized diversion in the rear of the Red Army. In the process, it lost 2,100 soldiers and 900 were wounded. The OUN-B formed Ukrainian militias that, displaying exceptional cruelty, carried out antisemitic pogroms and massacres of Jews. The largest pogroms in which Ukrainian nationalists were complicit took place in Lviv in two waves in June–July 1941, involving OUN-B activists, German military and paramilitary personnel, Ukrainian, and to a lesser extent Polish urban residents and peasants from the nearby countryside, and in the later wave the Ukrainian Auxiliary Police. Estimates of Jewish deaths in these events range between 4,000 (Dieter Pohl), 5,000 (Richard Breitman), and 6,000 (Peter Longerich). The involvement of OUN-B is unclear, but certainly OUN-B propaganda fuelled antisemitism. The vast majority of pogroms carried out by the Banderites occurred in Eastern Galicia and Volhynia.

One of the versions of the "Act of Proclamation of Ukrainian State" signed by Stepan Bandera

Eight days after Germany's invasion of the USSR, on 30 June 1941, the OUN-B proclaimed the establishment of Ukrainian State in Lviv, with Yaroslav Stetsko as premier. In response to the declaration, OUN-B leaders and associates were arrested and imprisoned by the Gestapo (circa 1500 persons). Many OUN-B members were killed outright or perished in jails and concentration camps (both of Bandera's brothers were eventually murdered at Auschwitz). On 18 September 1941, Bandera and Stetsko were sent to Sachsenhausen concentration camp in "Zellenbau Bunker", where they were kept until September 1944. While imprisoned, Bandera received help from the financial assistance from the OUN-B. The Germans permitted the Ukrainian nationalists to leave the bunker for an important meeting with OUN representatives in Fridental Castle which was 200 meters from Sachsenhausen.

In Bessarabia and Bukovina, after they became again part of Romania after the Operation München, the local OUN branches, although initially supportive of the German-Romanian offensive in the USSR, were dissatisfied with the reincorporation of these territories into the Kingdom of Romania and began to organize militias to engage in armed resistance. Initially, the Romanian Prime Minister Ion Antonescu agreed to allow the OUN branches to exist as part of the Romanian Gendarmerie troops but, after they engaged in clandestine activities, they were completely banned.

As a result of the German crackdown on the OUN-B, the faction controlled by Melnyk enjoyed an advantage over its rival and was able to occupy many positions in the civil administration of former Soviet Ukraine during the first months of German occupation. The first city which it administered was Zhitomir, the first major city across the old Soviet-Polish border. Here, the OUN-M helped stimulate the development of Prosvita societies, the appearance of local artists on Ukrainian-language broadcasts, the opening of two new secondary schools and a pedagogical institute, and the establishment of a school administration. Many locals were recruited into the OUN-M. The OUN-M also organized police forces, recruited from Soviet prisoners of war. Two senior members of its leadership, or Provid, even came to Zhitomir. At the end of August 1941, however, they were both gunned down, allegedly by the OUN-B which had justified the assassination in their literature and had issued a secret directive (referred to by Andriy Melnyk as a "death sentence") not to allow OUN-M leaders to reach Ukrainian SSR's capital Kiev (now Kyiv, Ukraine). In retaliation, the German authorities, often tipped off by OUN-M members, began mass arrests and executions of OUN-B members, to a large extent eliminating it in much of central and eastern Ukraine.

According to the Nuremberg Trials documents, on 25 November 1941, Einsatzkommando 5 received an order to "quietly liquidate" members of "Bandera-Movement" as it was confirmed that they were preparing a rebellion in the Reichskomissariat with the goal of establishing independent Ukraine.

As the Wehrmacht moved East, the OUN-M established control of Kiev's civil administration; that city's mayor from October 1941 until January 1942, Volodymyr Bahaziy, belonged to the OUN-M and used his position to funnel money into it and to help the OUN-M take control over Kiev's police. The OUN-M also initiated the creation of the Ukrainian National Council in Kiev, which was to become the basis for a future Ukrainian government. At this time, the OUN-M also came to control Kiev's largest newspaper and was able to attract many supporters from the central and eastern Ukrainian intelligentsia. Alarmed by the OUN-M's growing strength in central and eastern Ukraine, the German Nazi authorities swiftly and brutally cracked down on it, arresting and executing many of its members in early 1942, including Volodymyr Bahaziy, and the writer Olena Teliha who had organized and led the League of Ukrainian Writers in Kiev. Although during this time elements within the Wehrmacht tried in vain to protect OUN-M members, the organization was largely wiped out within central and eastern Ukraine.

A declassified 2007 CIA note summarised the situation as follows:

"The [German] army, which desired the genuine cooperation of the Ukrainians and was willing to allow the formation of a Ukrainian state, was quickly overruled by the [National-Socialist] party and the SS. The Germans used all means necessary to force the cooperation which the Ukrainians were largely unwilling to give. By summer 1941 a battle raged on Ukrainian soil between two ruthless exploiters and persecutors of the Ukrainian people [:] the Third Reich and the Soviet Union. The OUN and the partisan army created in late 1942, the UPA, fought bitterly against both the Germans and the Soviets and most of their respective allies".

==== OUN-B's fight for dominance in western Ukraine ====
An OUN-B leaflet from the World War II era

As the OUN-M was being wiped out in the regions of central and western Ukraine that had been east of the old Polish-Soviet border, in Volhynia the OUN-B, with easy access from its base in Galicia, began to establish and consolidate its control over the nationalist movement and much of the countryside. Unwilling and unable to openly resist the Germans in early 1942, it methodically set about creating a clandestine organization, engaging in propaganda work, and building weapons stockpiles. A major aspect of its programme was the infiltration of the local police; the OUN-B was able to establish control over the police academy in Rivne. By doing so the OUN-B hoped to eventually overwhelm the German occupation authorities ("If there were fifty policemen to five Germans, who would hold power then?"). In their role within the police, Bandera's forces were involved in the extermination of Jewish civilians and the clearing of Jewish ghettos, actions that contributed to the OUN-B's weapon stockpiles. In addition, blackmailing Jews served as a source of added finances. During the time that the OUN-B in Volhynia was avoiding conflict with the German authorities and working with them, resistance to the Germans was limited to Soviet partisans on the extreme northern edge of the region, to small bands of OUN-M fighters, and to a group of guerrillas knowns as the UPA or the Polessian Sich, unaffiliated with the OUN-B and led by Taras Bulba-Borovets of the exiled Ukrainian People's Republic.

In 1942, OUN leader Mykola Lebed ordered the settlement of Polish-Ukrainian relations. OUN held several meetings with the Polish government-in-exile. In the summer of 1942, at one of the meetings in Lviv, OUN and the Polish ambassadors agreed on the need for a joint anti-Nazi and anti-Soviet struggle. However, the Polish side was unable to guarantee the independence of western Ukraine, leading to a deadlock in the negotiations.

By late 1942, the status quo for the OUN-B was proving to be increasingly difficult. The German authorities were becoming increasingly repressive towards the Ukrainian population, and the Ukrainian police were reluctant to take part in such actions. Furthermore, Soviet partisan activity threatened to become the major outlet for anti-German resistance among western Ukrainians. By March 1943, the OUN-B leadership issued secret instructions ordering their members who had joined the German police in 1941–1942, numbering between 4,000 and 5,000 trained and armed soldiers, to desert with their weapons and to join the units of the OUN-B in Volyn. Borovets attempted to unite his UPA, the smaller OUN-M and other nationalist bands, and the OUN-B underground into an all-party front. The OUN-M agreed while the OUN-B refused, in part due to the insistence of the OUN-B that their leaders be in control of the organization.

After negotiations failed, OUN commander Dmytro Klyachkivsky coopted the name of Borovets' organization, UPA, and decided to accomplish by force what could not be accomplished through negotiation: the unification of Ukrainian nationalist forces under OUN-B control. On 6 July, the large OUN-M group was surrounded and surrendered, and soon afterward most of the independent groups disappeared; they were either destroyed by the Communist partisans or the OUN-B or joined the latter. On 18 August 1943, Taras Bulba-Borovets and his headquarters were surrounded in a surprise attack by an OUN-B force consisting of several battalions. Some of his forces, including his wife, were captured, while five of his officers were killed. Borovets escaped but refused to submit, in a letter accusing the OUN-B of among other things: banditry; of wanting to establish a one-party state; and of fighting not for the people but in order to rule the people. In retaliation, his wife was murdered after two weeks of torture at the hands of the OUN-B's SB. In October 1943 Bulba-Borovets largely disbanded his depleted force in order to end further bloodshed. In their struggle for dominance in Volhynia, the Banderists would kill tens of thousands of Ukrainians for links to Bulba-Borovets or Melnyk.

==== OUN-B near the end of World War II ====
26 high-ranking members of the OUN-B (alongside Greek Catholic priest Ivan Hrynokh) gathered in the village of Zolota Sloboda between 21 and 25 August, holding a Third Supreme Assembly. Termed "extraordinary" (Ukrainian: надзвичайний, romanized: nadzvychainyi; also read as "emergency") by the organisers, the meeting rejected the policies of integral nationalism in Bandera's absence in favour of pro-democratic and pro-peasantry positions. This was combined with the beginning of an insurgency against the Germans simultaneously with fighting Soviet partisans and Polish civilians in an effort to secure the existence of a Ukrainian state.

The policies adopted at the Third Supreme Assembly had been spurred by the German defeat at the Battle of Stalingrad, as well as a desire to appeal to people in central and eastern Ukraine who were reluctant to support the OUN-B due to its authoritarian policy. While this resistance to Germany was strongly opposed by the OUN-B's older members, who were reluctant to reform, it was welcomed by younger members who viewed Ukraine's independence as their primary aim. Local western Ukrainians also positively assessed the OUN-B's anti-German activities, though the Soviets' Lvov-Sandomierz Offensive shortly after the insurgency began led to the expulsion of German forces from western Ukraine. Marples has argued that the anti-German activities of the UPA were primarily interested in preventing the Germans from totally assuming control over Volhynia and Polesia, which were the primary strongholds of the UPA at the time.

Besides armed struggle, according to ICJ documents, OUN-B (referred as "Banderagruppe") was spreading anti-German propaganda comparing German policy towards Ukrainians with Holodomor.

By the fall of 1943, the OUN-B forces had established their control over substantial portions of rural areas in Volhynia and southwestern Polesia. While the Germans controlled the large towns and major roads, such a large area east of Rivne had come under the control of the OUN-B that it was able to set about creating a "state" system with military training schools, hospitals and a school system, involving tens of thousands of personnel.

Beginning in 1944, the OUN began to ally with the Germans in exchange for arms and control of territory. In a top-secret memorandum, General-Major Brigadeführer Brenner wrote in mid-1944 to SS-Obergruppenführer General Hans-Adolf Prützmann, the highest ranking German SS officer in Ukraine, that "The UPA has halted all attacks on units of the German army. The UPA systematically sends agents, mainly young women, into the enemy-occupied territory, and the results of the intelligence are communicated to Department 1c of the [German] Army Group" on the southern front. By the autumn of 1944, the German press was full of praise for the UPA for their anti-Bolshevik successes, referring to the UPA fighters as "Ukrainian fighters for freedom" In the latter half of 1944, Germans were supplying the OUN/UPA with arms and equipment in exchange for the end of attacks on German positions, along with further UPA attacks on the Soviets. In the Ivano-Frankivsk region, there even existed a small landing strip for German transport planes. Some German personnel trained in terrorist and intelligence activities behind Soviet lines, as well as some OUN-B leaders, were also transported through this channel.

Adopting a strategy analogous to that of the Chetnik leader General Draža Mihailović, the UPA limited its actions against the Germans in order to better prepare itself for and engage in the struggle against the Communists. Because of this, although the UPA managed to limit German activities to a certain extent, it failed to prevent the Germans from deporting approximately 500,000 people from Western Ukraine and from economically exploiting Western Ukraine. Due to its focus on the Soviets as the principal threat, the UPA's anti-German struggle did not contribute significantly to the recapture of Ukrainian territories by Soviet forces.

The OUN-B was actively involved in the massacres of Poles in Volhynia and Eastern Galicia, through the formally independent but heavily connected UPA. The majority of delegates at the Third Supreme Assembly expressed their formal approval of the anti-Polish violence led by Dmytro Klyachkivsky.

=== After the Second World War ===
==== Cold War ====
After World War II ended in 1945, the OUN in eastern and southern Ukraine continued to struggle against the Soviets; 1958 marked the last arrest of an OUN member in Donetsk. Both branches of the OUN continued to have influence within the Ukrainian diaspora. In 1943 the OUN-B had formed the Anti-Bolshevik Bloc of Nations (ABN), a group headed by Yaroslav Stetsko from 1943 to 1986. This organisation, created and headed by the OUN-B, would include at various times émigré organizations from almost every eastern-European country (with the exception of Poland): Croatia, the Baltic countries of Estonia, Latvia and Lithuania, anti-communist émigré Cossacks, Hungary, Georgia, Bohemia-Moravia (the present-day Czech Republic), and Slovakia. In the 1970s, anti-communist Vietnamese and Cuban organizations joined the ABN. The Lithuanian partisans had particularly close ties with the OUN.

In the mid-1950s, the OUN-B split into two factions: the broadly social-democratic but short-lived OUN-z led by Lev Rebet and by Zinoviy Matla, and the Dontsovite authoritarian OUN-r led by Bandera.

Soon after the defeat of Nazi Germany in 1945 exiled members of the OUN established contacts with British intelligence. These contacts were facilitated by Gerhard von Mende, a German professor and supporter of the Anti-Bolshevik Bloc. Great Britain also hosted the archives of OUN-B's foreign branch, which were transferred from Germany after the electoral victory of Willy Brandt's Social Democrats in 1970. During the Cold War, OUN agents provided British intelligence with data on Soviet military objects and other strategic locations — not only in Ukraine, but also in other parts of the USSR — and also informed them about military maneuvers, the mobilization process and the general mood of the population in the Soviet Union and its satellite states. British intelligence, in its turn, engaged in training OUN-B members. More than 10 schools preparing Ukrainian émigrés for underground activities against the Soviet régime were organized in Bavaria, Lower Saxony and London. According to information provided to the KGB, training centres for OUN-B members remained active in the United Kingdom into the 1980s.

In May 1951, a group of OUN-B agents was airlifted to Ukraine from the British base in Malta. They landed in the Ternopil region and attempted to establish ties with the local anti-communist resistance. However, as a result of a provocation, they were captured by Soviet internal troops. During the same period United States intelligence set up a similar group of agents recruited from supporters of the Ukrainian Supreme Liberation Council (UHVR). The last group of OUN-B agents from abroad entered Ukraine in 1960, illegally crossing the Polish-Soviet border in the area between Przemyśl and Dobromyl. After the cessation of open resistance against the Soviet régime in Ukraine, starting from the mid-to-late 1960s numerous OUN-B agents would penetrate the border posing as tourists. After the end of the Cold War in the late 1980s the OUN openly supported anti-Soviet intelligentsia circles in Soviet Ukraine.

==== Independent Ukraine ====
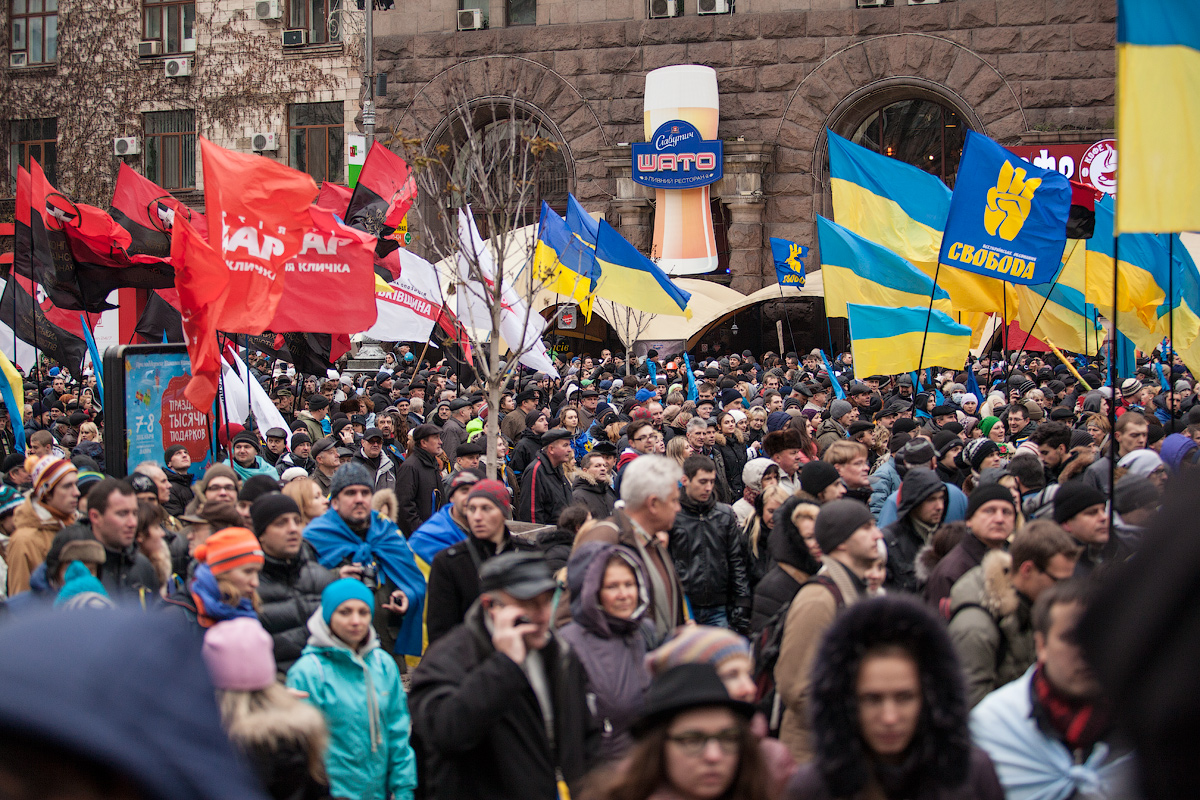
Euromaidan in Kyiv, December 2013. Protesters with OUN-B flag.

The OUN factions in the diasopra were initially reluctant to return to open political activity in Ukraine during 1989–1991 due to the political dominance of the Communist Party. The Banderite OUN-r set up the Congress of Ukrainian Nationalists (KUN) in 1992, which initially attempted to present a moderate front before the party was drawn further to the right by its domestic recruits. According to Andrew Wilson, these members wanted to create an idealised version of Bandera's OUN. Until her death in 2003, KUN was headed by Slava Stetsko, widow of Yaroslav Stetsko, who also simultaneously headed the OUN-B and the Anti-Bolshevik Bloc of Nations. The OUN-M established itself as a non-governmental organization in 1993 and mainly engaged in publishing activities.

On 9 March 2010, the Kyiv Post reported that the OUN (technically the OUN-M) rejected Yulia Tymoshenko's calls to unite "all of the national patriotic forces" led by the Yulia Tymoshenko Bloc against Viktor Yanukovych. The OUN-M demanded that Yanukovych should reject the idea of cancelling the Hero of Ukraine status given to Stepan Bandera and Roman Shukhevych, Yanukovych should continue the practice of recognising fighters for Ukraine's independence, which was launched by (his predecessor) Viktor Yushchenko, and posthumously award the Hero of Ukraine titles to Yevhen Konovalets and Symon Petliura. On 19 November 2018, the Organisation of Ukrainian Nationalists, as well as the Congress of Ukrainian Nationalists and Ukrainian nationalist groups Right Sector and C14, endorsed Ruslan Koshulynskyi's candidacy in the 2019 Ukrainian presidential election. In the election Koshulynskyi received 1.6% of the votes.

== Organization ==
The OUN was led by a Vozhd or Supreme Leader. Originally the Vozhd was Yevhen Konovalets; after his assassination he was succeeded by Andriy Melnyk resulting in a split where the Galician youths followed their own Vozhd, Stepan Bandera. Underneath the Vozhd were the Provid, or directorate. At the start of the second world war the OUN's leadership consisted of the Vozhd, Andrii Melnyk, and eight members of the Provid. The Provid members were: Generals Kurmanovych and Kapustiansky (both generals from the times of Ukraine's revolution in 1918–1920); Yaroslav Baranovsky, a law student; Dmytro Andriievsky, a politically moderate former diplomat of the revolutionary government from eastern Ukraine; Richard Yary, a former officer of the Austrian and Galician militaries who served as a liaison with the German intelligence services, the Abwehr; colonel Roman Sushko, another former Austrian and Galician officer; Mykola Stsiborsky, the son of a tsarist military officer from Zhytomir, who served as the OUN's official theorist; and Omelian Senyk, a party organizer and veteran of the Austrian and Galician armies who by the 1940s was considered too moderate and too conservative by the youngest generation of Galician youths. Yary would be the only member of the original Provid to join Bandera after the OUN split.

== Ideology ==
Front page of a 1948 copy of the Decalogue of a Ukrainian Nationalist

The primary goal of OUN was to establish an independent and ethnically pure Ukrainian state. The OUN's leadership felt that past attempts at securing independence failed due to democratic values in society, poor party discipline and a conciliatory attitude towards Ukraine's traditional enemies. Its ideology rejected the socialist ideas supported by Petliura, and the compromises of Galicia's traditional elite. Instead, the OUN, particularly its younger members, adopted the ideology of Dmytro Dontsov, an émigré from Eastern Ukraine.

The OUN was formed from the UVO and several extreme right-wing organizations, including the Ukrainian National Association, the Union of Ukrainian Fascists and the Union for the Liberation of Ukraine. Initially, it was led by war veterans who failed to establish a Ukrainian state in 1917–1920. According to Per Anders Rudling, the ideology of the organization was heavily influenced by the philosophy of Nietzsche, German Nazism, and Italian fascism, combining extreme nationalism with terrorism, corporatism, and antisemitism. Heorhii Kasyanov wrote that it manifested typical anti-democratic features.

Chief principles of OUN's ideology were formulated by the Decalogue of a Ukrainian Nationalist published by Stepan Lenkavskyi in 1929.

=== Nationalism ===
The nationalists who emerged in Galicia following the First World War, much as in the rest of Europe, adopted the form of nationalism known as Integral nationalism. (Note: From p. 523: "The term "integral nationalism" has emerged as the most accurate and least tendentious label for "active nationalism" in the scholarly literature on Dontsov and the OUN") According to this ideology, the nation was held to be of the highest absolute value, more important than social class, regions, the individual, religion, etc. To this end, OUN members were urged to "force their way into all areas of national life" such as institutions, societies, villages and families. Politics was seen as a Darwinian struggle between nations for survival, rendering conflict unavoidable and justifying any means that would lead to the victory of one's nation over that of others. In this context willpower was seen as more important than reason, and warfare was glorified as an expression of national vitality.

Integral nationalism became a powerful force in much of Europe during the 1920s and 1930s. The OUN's conceptualization of this idea was particular in several ways. Because Ukraine was stateless and surrounded by more powerful neighbors, the emphasis on force and warfare was to be expressed in acts of terrorism rather than open warfare, and illegality was glorified. Because Ukrainians did not have a state to glorify or serve, the emphasis was placed on a "pure" national language and culture rather than a State. There was a strain of fantastic romanticism, in which the unsophisticated Ukrainian rejection of reason was more spontaneous and genuine than the cynical rejection of reason by German or Italian integral nationalists. The OUN viewed the Ukrainian Greek Catholic Church as a rival and condemned Catholic leaders as police informers or potential informers; the Church rejected integral nationalism as incompatible with Christian ethics. The conflict between the OUN and the Church eased in the late 1930s.

Dmytro Dontsov claimed that the 20th century would witness the "twilight of the gods to whom the nineteenth century prayed" and that a new man must be created, with the "fire of fanatical commitment" and the "iron force of enthusiasm", and that the only way forward was through "the organization of a new violence." This new doctrine was the chynnyi natsionalizm – the "nationalism of the deed". To dramatize and spread such views, OUN literature mythologized the cult of struggle, sacrifice, and emphasized national heroes. The OUN, particularly Bandera, held a romantic view of the Ukrainian peasantry, glorified the peasants as carriers of Ukrainian culture and linked them with the deeds and exploits of the Ukrainian Cossacks from previous centuries. The OUN believed that a goal of professional revolutionaries was, through revolutionary acts, to awaken the masses. In this aspect the OUN had much in common with 19th-century Russian Narodniks.

=== Fascism ===
The classification of the ideology of interwar Ukrainian nationalism has been the subject of a long-running debate among historians. Political scientist Ivan Gomza notes that heated debates have arisen around fascist designations of various interwar nationalist organizations, politicians, and ideologies, writing that "Due to the conceptual hindrance, it is difficult to characterize the OUN's ideology as fascist since it remains unclear what fascism is." Gomza characterises the historiography as being divided between two polarized narratives that he terms the "invective" and the "heroic". According to Gomza, the 'invective' narrative presents the OUN as a chauvinist organization "willingly committing the most egregious crimes" while the 'heroic' narrative presents the OUN as a patriotic organization fighting to liberate the subjugated Ukrainian people.

Historian Per Anders Rudling described the OUN as having "the fascist attributes of anti-liberalism, anti-conservatism, and anticommunism, an armed party, totalitarianism, anti-Semitism, 'Führerprinzip', and an adoption of fascist greetings. Its leaders eagerly emphasized to Hitler and Ribbentrop that they shared the Nazi 'Weltanschauung' and a commitment to a fascist New Europe." He described it as a "typical fascist movement" and wrote that it "cultivated close relations with Fascist Italy, Nazi Germany, the Spanish Falange and the Croatian Ustaše".

According to political scientist Ivan Gomza, the "morphological structure" of the OUN's ideology in the 1930s and early 1940s could be defined as fascist because it had the following principles: (1) rebirth of the national community; (2) the search for some new form of political and economic organization, which transcends liberal democracy and collectivistic communism; and (3) the use of threats and violence during its political struggle. Gomza wrote that OUN writers rejected both Soviet communism and liberal democracy and wished to instill a single-party state, living in the unrealized glory of battles past and an economic system that aimed to avoid class conflict. He also argued that violence was an "extensive, widespread and frequent" occurrence and was central in the group's ideology and policy; the group took advantage of wartime chaos to eliminate Polish, Muscovite and Jewish activist groups. However, he wrote that after 1943 some "peripheral concepts" came to substitute the fascist core, which led to a splinter within the OUN and subsequent democratization of one of its factions.

The political scientist Ivan Katchanovski described it as "a semi-totalitarian organization which combined elements of extreme nationalism and fascism". Historian Grzegorz Rossoliński-Liebe wrote that the OUN had "created its own form of fascism" and that it "attempted to become a mass movement and to establish an ethnically homogenous Ukrainian state. It viewed and used mass violence as a political aim and killed civilians en masse." He also wrote that the members of the movement "claimed to be related to movements such as the Italian Fascists, the German Nazis, the Ustasa, and the Iron Guard". Marples has described how some writers in the OUN tradition, as well as some later Ukrainian writers, have been "self-deceptive" in emphasizing the absence of racism from OUN ideology, downplaying its connection to western European fascism, and suggesting that the Ukrainian brand of nationalism was a product of domestic development.

Political scientist Alexander J. Motyl considered the OUN to have fascist inclinations, but viewed it to be a kind of nationalist movement, with differences from fascism arising from the goal of nationalists to create nations, rather than run existing nations. He compared it in its nature to other national liberation movements which had authoritarian inclinations, strong leaders, and engaged in violence and terrorism, such as the Algerian National Liberation Front or the Palestine Liberation Organization. According to historian Stanley Payne "there were elements in [the OUN] that favored fascism, but it was not so much a revolutionary movement as a composite radical nationalism". He said it was "highly authoritarian and violently antisemitic" but said that was "rather common in the East European politics of the era". According to him, it was on the "extreme end of the radical right but not fully fascist", and the ideology was comparable to Putinism, saying the only difference between them is the antisemitism.

Political scientist Luboš Veselý criticises Rossoliński-Liebe as intentionally painting all Ukrainian nationalists negatively. Per Veselý, Rossoliński-Liebe "considers nationalism in general to be closely related to fascism" and fails to put Ukrainian nationalism, as well as antisemitism and fascist movements, in context of their rise in other European countries at the time. Rossoliński-Liebe does not mention arguments of other Ukrainian historians, such as Heorhii Kasianov. Veselý rejects Rossoliński-Liebe's conclusion that Ukrainian nationalists needed the protection of Nazi Germany and therefore collaborated with them.

Ukrainian historian Oleksandr Zaitsev notes that Rossolinski-Liebe's approach ignores "the fundamental differences between ultra-nationalist movements of nations with and without a state". Zaitsev highlights that the OUN did not identify itself with fascism, but "officially objected to this identification". Zaitsev suggests that it would be more correct to see the OUN as the revolutionary ultranationalist movements of stateless nations, which were aiming not to "the reorganization of the existing state according to totalitarian principles, but to create a new state, using all available means, including terror, to this end." According to Zaitsev, Rossolinski-Liebe omits some facts, which do not fit into his "a priori scheme of 'fascism', 'racism' and 'genocidal nationalism'", and denies "the presence of liberatory and democratic elements" in Bandera movement. Zaitsev offers the term ustashism as a designation for the ideology of the OUN which he defines in a generic sense pertaining to integral nationalism— he has since defined the OUN's ideology as "proto-fascist integral nationalism in the absence of nation-state".

==== Beyond World War II ====
Many Ukrainian historians, such as Peter Potichnyj, have argued that from 1941 and especially after the war, the OUN developed in a pro-democratic and anti-Nazi direction. After the Second World War, OUN émigrés and UPA members began to produce documents that emphasised this shift and downplayed the controversial aspects of the organization. For example, they published anti-Nazi texts by OUN activists. In some documents, they removed statements related to fascism or the Holocaust; in one case, they reprinted the April 1941 resolution in Kraków of the Second Great Congress of OUN, omitting that the organisation adopted an official salute consisting of the fascist salute while shouting "Glory to Ukraine! Glory to the Heroes!". OUN's denials of its role in the Holocaust began in 1943 after it became obvious that Germany would lose the war. What Rossolinski describes as a whitewashing of its history continued after the war, with OUN's propaganda describing its legacy as a "heroic Ukrainian resistance against the Nazis and the Communists".

In 1943, the OUN developed a new political program that focused on a "new order of a free individual. A man's free will should animate social life." The group also accepted a market economy, officially abandoned ethnic chauvinism, and accepted liberal democratic values.

Although the groups realized allegiance to these edits, and whether the group could in fact remove itself from the label of fascism is debated among historians, the result of these changes led to a split, which divided the faction into two groups, the fascists, and the liberals. The infighting of these groups was limited to diasporic communities in the US, Canada, and Germany. notably, the liberal faction became more powerful due to support from the United States Government which funded multiple thinktanks including the Prolog Research and Publishing Company.

=== Authoritarianism ===
The nation was to be unified under a single party led by a hierarchy of proven fighters. At the top was to be a Supreme Leader or Vozhd. In some respects the OUN's creed was similar to that of other eastern European, radical right-wing agrarian movements, such as Romania's Legion of the Archangel Michael (more commonly known as the Iron Guard), Croatia's Ustashe, Hungary's Arrow Cross Party, and similar groups in Slovakia and Poland; however, there were significant differences within the OUN regarding its relationship to fascism. The more moderate leaders living in exile admired some facets of Benito Mussolini's Italian fascism but condemned Nazism, while the younger more radical members based within Ukraine admired the fascist ideas and methods as practised by the Nazis. The faction-based abroad supported rapprochement with the Ukrainian Catholic Church while the younger radicals were anti-clerical and felt that not considering the Nation to be the Absolute was a sign of weakness. The two factions of the OUN each had their own understanding of the nature of the leader. The Melnyk faction considered the leader to be the director of the Provid and in its writings emphasized a military subordination to the hierarchical superiors of the Provid. It was more autocratic than totalitarian. The Bandera faction, in contrast, emphasized complete submission to the will of the supreme leader.

At a party congress in August 1943, the OUN-B rejected much of its fascistic ideology in favor of a democratic model, while maintaining its hierarchical structure. This change could be attributed in part to the influence of the leadership of Roman Shukhevych, the new leader of UPA, who was more focused on military matters rather than on ideology and was more receptive to different ideological themes than were the fanatical OUN-B political leaders, and was interested in gaining and maintaining the support of deserters or others from Eastern Ukraine. During this party congress, the OUN-B backed off its commitment to private ownership of land, increased worker participation in the management of industry, equality for women, free health services and pensions for the elderly, and free education. Some points in the program referred to the rights of national minorities and guaranteed freedom of speech, religion, and the press and rejected the official status of any doctrine. Nevertheless, the authoritarian elements were not discarded completely and were reflected in the continued insistence on the "heroic spirit" and "social solidarity, friendship and discipline." In exile, the OUN's ideology was focused on opposition to communism.

=== Treatment of non-Ukrainians ===
The OUN intended to create a Ukrainian state with widely understood Ukrainian territories, but inhabited by Ukrainian people narrowly understood, according to Timothy Snyder. Its first congress in 1929 resolved that "Only the complete removal of all occupiers from Ukrainian lands will allow for the general development of the Ukrainian Nation within its own state." OUN's "Ten Commandments" stated "Aspire to expand the strength, riches, and size of the Ukrainian State even by means of enslaving foreigners", or "Thou shalt struggle for the glory, greatness, power, and space of the Ukrainian state by enslaving the strangers". This formulation was modified by OUN's theoreticians in the 1950s and shortened to "Thou shalt struggle for the glory, greatness, power, and space of the Ukrainian state". According to Door Karel C. Berkhoff, due to the influence of Roman Shukhevych on the OUN the organization in October 1943, issued a communication (in Ukrainian only) that condemned the "mutual mass murders" of Ukrainians and Poles.

=== Antisemitism ===
Antisemitism was a common attribute of agrarian radical right-wing Eastern European organizations, such as the Croatian Ustashe, the Yugoslav Zbor and the Romanian Iron Guard. The OUN's ideology, on the other hand, did not initially emphasize antisemitism - despite the presence of antisemitic writings. During the OUN's early years, there were many prominent Jewish members of the OUN, and the OUN broadly condemned antisemitic violence. In the 1930s, the OUN publicly compared Jews to parasites and called for the violent removal of Jews from Ukrainian society. When the OUN allied with Nazi Germany in 1941 - the OUN-B called for the slaughter of Ukrainian Jewry, and the OUN praised the Germany for bringing their methods of segregating and executing Jews to Ukraine.

Three of its leaders, General Mykola Kapustiansky, Rico Yary (himself of Hungarian-Jewish descent), and Mykola Stsyborsky, who was the OUN's chief theorist, were married to Jewish women, and some Jews belonged to the OUN's underground movement. The OUN in the early 1930s considered Ukraine's primary enemies to be Poles and Russians, with Jews playing a secondary role as collaborators An article published in 1930 by OUN leader Mykola Stsyborsky denounced the anti-Jewish pogroms of 1918, stating that most of its victims were innocent rather than Bolsheviks. Stsyborsky wrote that Jewish rights should be respected, that the OUN ought to convince Jews that their organization was no threat to them and that Ukrainians ought to maintain close contacts with Jews nationally and internationally. Three years later, an article in the OUN journal Rozbudova Natsii ("Development of the Nation"), despite its focus on Jews' alleged exploitation of Ukrainian peasants, also stated that Jews, as well as Ukrainians, were victims of Soviet policies. Evhen Onatsky, writing in the OUN's official journal in 1934, condemned German Nazism as imperialist, racist and anti-Christian. In response to objections within the organisation to Stsyborsky's dynamic marital past and his relationship with a Jewish woman in 1934, Konovalets wrote:

"If nationalism is waging war against mixed marriages insofar as conquerors (especially Poles and Russians) are concerned, then it cannot bypass the problem of mixed marriages with Jews, who are indisputably if not greater, then at least comparable, foes of our rebirth."^{:325-6}

Konovalets did however side with Stsyborsky when he complained about the particularly extreme antisemitic writings of theorist Oleksander Mytsiuk being published in the OUN newsletter Rozbudova natsiï, reprimanding the editor Volodymyr Martynets.^{:321}

By the late 1930s, the OUN's attitude towards Jews changed to one of hostility. Jews were described in OUN publications as parasites who ought to be segregated from Ukrainians. For example, an article titled "The Jewish Problem in Ukraine" published in 1938 by the OUN, called for Jews' complete cultural, economic and political isolation from Ukrainians, rejecting forced assimilation of Jews but allowing that they ought to enjoy the same rights as Ukrainians. Despite the increasingly negative portrayal of Jews, for all of its glorification of violence, Ukrainian nationalist literature generally showed little interest in Nazi-like antisemitism during the 1930s. German documents from the early 1940s give the impression that extreme Ukrainian nationalists were indifferent to the plight of the Jews; they were willing to either kill them or help them, whichever was more appropriate, for their political goals. The OUN-B's ambivalent early wartime attitude towards the Jews was highlighted during the Second General Congress of OUN-B (April 1941, Kraków)in which the OUN-B condemned anti-Jewish pogroms. and specifically warned against the pogromist mindset as useful only to Muscovite propaganda. At that conference the OUN-B declared "The Jews in the USSR constitute the most faithful support of the ruling Bolshevik regime and the vanguard of Muscovite imperialism in Ukraine. The Muscovite-Bolshevik government exploits the anti-Jewish sentiments of the Ukrainian masses to divert their attention from the true cause of their misfortune and to channel them in a time of frustration into pogroms on Jews. The OUN combats the Jews as the prop of the Muscovite-Bolshevik regime and simultaneously it renders the masses conscious of the fact that the principal foe is Moscow."

As the war progressed, the OUN's antisemitism descended into genocidal rhetoric and violence. Despite its official condemnation of pogroms in April 1941, when German official Reinhard Heydrich requested "self-cleansing actions" in June of that year - the OUN organized militias answered the call, murdering several thousand Jews in western Ukraine soon afterward that same year. During the German invasion of the USSR, Yaroslav Stetsko stated in a report to Bandera: "We are raising a militia that will assist in the extermination of Jews... I am of the opinion that the Jews should be annihilated by applying the German methods of extermination in Ukraine." The Ukrainian People's Militia under the OUN's command led pogroms that resulted in the massacre of 6,000 Jews in Lviv soon after that city's fall to German forces. OUN members spread propaganda urging people to engage in pogroms. A slogan put forth by the Bandera group and recorded in the 16 July 1941 Einsatzgruppen report stated: "Long live Ukraine without Jews, Poles and Germans; Poles behind the river San, Germans to Berlin, and Jews to the gallows".

In instructions to its members concerning how the OUN should behave during the war, it declared that "in times of chaos... one can allow oneself to liquidate Polish, Russian and Jewish figures, particularly the servants of Bolshevik-Muscovite imperialism" and further, when speaking of Russians, Poles, and Jews, to "destroy in struggle, particularly those opposing the regime, by means of: deporting them to their own lands, eradicating their intelligentsia, which is not to be admitted to any governmental positions, and overall preventing any creation of this intelligentsia (e.g. access to education etc)... Jews are to be isolated, removed from governmental positions in order to prevent sabotage... Those who are deemed necessary may only work under strict supervision and removed from their positions for slightest misconduct... Jewish assimilation is not possible." Ivan Klymiv, the OUN-B leader in Volhynia, wrote a directive in August 1941 calling for the OUN-B to "wipe out Poles, Jews, professors, officers, leaders, and all established enemy elements of Ukraine and Germany." OUN members who infiltrated the German police were involved in clearing ghettos and helping the Germans to implement the Final Solution. Although most Jews were actually killed by Germans, the OUN police working for them played a crucial supporting role in the liquidation of 200,000 Jews in Volyn in the beginning of the war. OUN bands also killed Jews who had fled into the forests from the Germans. One of the UPA leaders reportedly compared the OUN's massacres of Poles to the Final Solution: "When it comes to the Polish question, this is not a military but a minority question. We will solve it as Hitler solved the Jewish question." The OUN did help some Jews to escape in isolated cases. According to a report to the Chief of the Security Police in Berlin, dated 30 March 1942, "...it has been clearly established that the Bandera movement provided forged passports not only for its own members, but also for Jews."

Once the OUN was at war with Germany, anti-Jewish instances lessened, but never stopped. According to documents released from the Security Service of Ukraine, the OUN not only never gave up its antisemitic ideology and always associated Jews with communists. Among the documents released was this, giving clear evidence of continued antisemitism.

"National minorities are divided into a / friendly to us ... b / hostile to us Muscovites, Poles, Jews ... a / They have the same rights as Ukrainians, we allow them to return to their homeland. b / Extermination in the struggle, in particular those that will fight the regime; extermination mainly of the intelligentsia, which is not free to admit to any government, and in general make it impossible to produce the intelligentsia, that is, access to schools, etc. Eg the so-called to assimilate Polish peasants, realizing to them that they are Ukrainians, only of the Latin rite ... To destroy leaders, to isolate Jews, to move from governments to avoid sabotage, especially Muscovites and Poles. If there was an irresistible need to leave a Jew in the household apparatus, put our policeman over his head and eliminate him for the slightest offence. Only Ukrainians can be leaders of individual spheres of life, not foreigners - enemies. Our government must be terrible for its opponents. Terror for foreign enemies and traitors. /Арх.спр. № 376, v.6, ark.294-302 /.

— Reference of the Security Service of Ukraine № 113 "On the activities of the OUN-UPA" dated 30 July 1993

== Economic program ==
OUN's ideologists underlined their adherence to the ideas of economic nationalism which emerged under the influence of German publicist Friedrich List. Unlike his compatriot Karl Marx, who considered class struggle to be the main factor of economic and social progress, List instead viewed nations as the most important actors in the development of human society. Both Marx and List supported state involvement in economic life, but their difference lay in their attitude to private property, with the former supporting its abolition and the latter seeing it as a basic element of social relations. List's ideas found support in Germany under the leadership of Bismarck and in the Russian Empire, where their main proponents were Sergei Witte and Dmitri Mendeleev. During the Interwar era economic nationalism was also employed by newly emerged European states such as Hungary, Latvia, Lithuania, Poland, Czechoslovakia, Estonia and Yugoslavia. Elements of economic nationalism were also present in contemporary government policies in Spain, United States and the United Kingdom.

OUN's economic platform was formed between 1927-1929 in advance to its First Congress. Among its authors were Yakiv Moralevych (1878-1961), Leonid Kostariv (1888-?) and Mykola Stsiborskyi (1897-1941), whose activities were connected with the Ukrainian Husbandry Academy in the Czechoslovak town of Poděbrady. All of them stemmed from Russian-ruled regions of Ukraine and supported pragmatic economic cooperation of Ukrainians with their neighbours in Russia and Poland.

=== Financial policies ===
In his report to the First Congress of the OUN in 1929, Moralevych promoted the introduction of a temporary Ukrainian currency, karbovanets, which would initially be tied to the Soviet ruble and later replaced with hryvnia, a proper national currency whose price would in its turn be tied to the currencies of the USA, UK and France (a similar scheme was eventually used during the 1996 Ukrainian monetary reform). He also concerned himself with the creation of a Ukrainian banking system and payment of government debts, supporting the foundation of a national bank, which would be independent from both businesses and other government institutions.

OUN's financial program foresaw an important role of state authorities in many branches of the financial sphere. Moralevych proposed the establishment of special control organs in order to supervise banking activities. According to his program, foreign debts of the Ukrainian People's Republic were to be recognized by the future independent Ukrainian government, and a special institution would be created for their repayment.

In the sphere of taxation Moralevych's plan included the introduction of taxes on income, land, gifts, movable and immovable property, exports and imports, as well as a value added tax. Most of the taxes were to be introduced according to a proportional system based on the total income and social status of separate citizens. Moralevych also supported the establishment of state monopoly on the production of alcohol and tobacco, or the introduction of excises for private companies. An important role in his program was attributed to foreign investment.

=== Economic policies ===
According to Yakiv Moralevych, the initial goal of OUN's economic policies was to be the reform of the agrarian sector, including provision of necessary technologies and equipment to agriculture. The next important direction of economic policies would be the sphere of energy. His program promoted the development of heavy industry, although it was argued that light industry would have a better potential for swift development in Ukraine. International credits were to cover the expenses for construction of railways, development of water transport and hydroenergetics; meanwhile the road system was to be financed from local budgets and concessions.

An important contribution to OUN's views on economy was made by Leonid Kostariv, whose program of industrial development of Ukraine was adopted at the First Congress of the OUN. It divided all industrial enterprises into three categories according to their level of strategic importance. The most significant enterprises, including mines, steel mills and part of chemical, machine and weapons producers, were to be owned and managed by the state. Less important branches were to be owned by joint-stock companies with part of their shares belonging to the state. Smaller enterprises were to remain in private ownership and engage in free competition. A special institution - Main Council of National Economy - was to be introduced for the management of state-owned shares, which would also observe service and production standards and provide labour protection. Nationalization was seen as a way of balancing private and state capitals and preventing foreign owners from exerting too much influence. According to OUN's views, the state had to create an environment in which own science and technologies could be developed.

Mykola Stsiborskyi took part in the development of OUN's agrarian and trade policies. He supported the transfer of grain trade to private farmers and opposed protectionism in that sphere, but promoted it for sugar trade. All industrial exports, in their turn, were to be subjected to state control. Stsiborskyi opposed the infiltration of private capital in large-scale industry. He viewed Russia as an important destination of Ukrainian exports of coal, ore and iron, and saw Germany, USA, Great Britain and Russia as important sources of imports in the sphere of light industry.

In the sphere of agriculture Stsiborskyi's program supported the involvement of both private and state property. Both minimum and maximum size of a personal land plot was to be regulated by law, and land inheritance was to be limited to only one offspring, with the rest receiving a monetary compensation instead. The division of lands established after 1917 was to be preserved, with the land of collective farms being distributed between their members. Stsiborskyi saw the base of Ukrainian agriculture in private middle class farmers united into cooperatives. Support of agrarians was to be provided through long-term credits issued both by the state and by private capital. Excess rural population was to be requalified.

=== Attempts at realization ===
Soon after the beginning of World War II, in 1940 the Provid of OUN established the Commission on State Planning (KDP - Ukrainian: Комісія державного планування, КДП) headed by Oleh Olzhych, which consisted of 15 subcommissions. Among its members were notable scientists and statesmen Borys Martos and Kostiantyn Matsiyevych. The commission prepared plans on the development of finances and trade, agriculture, industry and general economy. Its activities were based on the economic platform of the OUN. The commission created a number of projects of laws concerning trade, finances, state budget, taxation, credits, banking and other economic issues. An important point of those projects was the protection of Ukrainian private enterprise. Ethnic Ukrainians had to receive priority in the management of industrial enterprises, although representatives of other nations could also be appointed if needed.

The original KDP was dominated by Melnykites, as a result of which the Bandera wing of OUN created its own commission with an identical name. A decree issued by OUN-B before the outset of the German-Soviet War called for the preservation of existing social relations in Ukrainian lands. Opposition from German authorities, as well as the poor state of Ukraine's villages and lack of mechanization, forced the nationalists to postpone the introduction of certain measures from their program, such as the disbandment of collective farms, which were instead to be replaced by so-called "people's committees", whose representatives were to form the base of a future all-Ukrainian Constitutional Congress. The future redistribution of land was to prioritize war veterans and large working families. Following the adoption of the Act on the Reestablishment of the Ukrainian State on 30 June 1941, OUN promoted the gradual abolition of collective ownership on land, and in some cases threatened people leaving collectivized farms with punishment. Monetary policy also remained conservative, with the Soviet ruble remaining in use as currency. Permissions on private trade by OUN's authorities were combined with the introduction of price controls. Following the expulsion of Soviets from Lviv, Ukrainian cooperative organizations, such as the Maslosoyuz, resumed their activities in the city. Crediting was forbidden, and barter schemes were eventually outlawed in order to stop hyperinflation. On 13 July 1941 the Provid of OUN-B established an exchange rate for currencies. Taxation measures were introduced, with trade and banking enterprises gradually restoring their activities.

In August 1941 a project of the Statute of a Ukrainian Economic Bureau was published. The institution was to analyze the Ukrainian economy and adopt development programs. However, it was never created due to the crackdown on the Ukrainian nationalist movement by German authorities, who in September broke their relations with the OUN and started persecuting its members. German war planners saw Ukraine as a mere source of labour force and raw materials, and used economic measures in order to subdue the local population. In the sphere of banking the Germans introduced strict centralization and removed all non-Germans from management. In the environment of severe repression, OUN's activists were forced to turn to underground activities, abandoning the previous conservative line and exploiting the opposition of Ukrainian peasants to collectivization. In September 1941 the Provid of Southern Ukraine issued an instruction on the privatization of land through specially created peasant committees. In July 1943 the Chief Command of the Ukrainian Insurgent Army headed by Klym Savur issued a decree on the liquidation of collective farms and proclaimed the transfer of lands previously owned by Polish colonists to Ukrainian peasants.

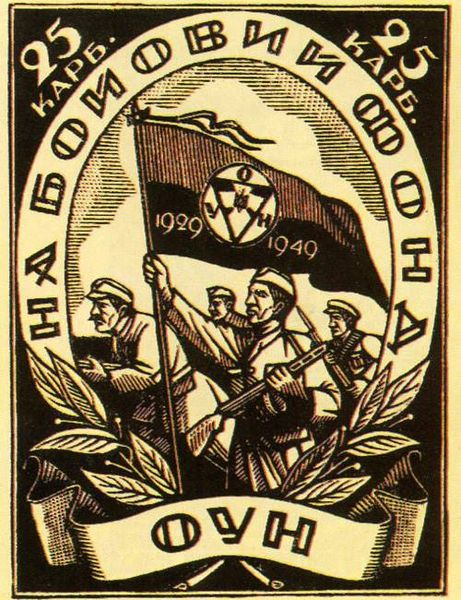
A bofon equivalent of 25 karbovanets, 1944

The Third Extraordinary Congress of OUN-B in August 1943 mentioned economic development as the main goal of a future democratic Ukrainian government. Land was to be transferred to peasants without compensation, with the maximal and minimal sizes of plots being limited by law; sale of land was to be forbidden; a right on the establishment of cooperatives was to be provided; the state was to promote agriculture with technical and financial means; all mineral deposits, water and forests were proclaimed to be communal property. The goal of state ownership over transport and large-scale industry was confirmed. OUN-B also proclaimed its allegiance to state involvement in banking and large-scale trade with simultaneous preservation of private ownership over small-scale enterperises. During the following period UPA's propaganda emphasized the right to private property and economic protection of Ukrainians from foreign governments and capitalists as one of the chief goals of its struggle. The insurgents established an administrative structure in territories controlled by their forces, which included departments responsible for agriculture, finances, trade and industry. During that period UPA amassed German Marks and US dollars by exchanging devaluing Polish currency. The army's supplies by enterprises were subjected to an emerging bureaucratic system. During that time OUN introduced its own currency - bofon, whose value was tied to currencies valid in one or another region. In 1943 they were spread around Galicia, Volyn and Polissia.

Starting from the second half of 1944, in the environment of Soviet occupation, OUN had to abandon the introduction of their economic program and concentrated on the destruction of the enemy's economic infrastructure. The creation of Ukrainian Supreme Liberation Council in July 1944 failed to establish a real administrative vertical of power, and the economic measures of OUN and UPA in the following period had a predominantly declarative character.

=== Economic legacy ===
Despite its popularity in the Ukrainian nationalist movement, economic nationalism promoted by the OUN failed to take root in Ukraine due to the predominance of Marxist and, later, neoliberal ideas.

== Legacy ==
A number of contemporary far-right Ukrainian political organizations claim to be inheritors of the OUN's political traditions, including Svoboda, Right Sector, the Ukrainian National Assembly – Ukrainian National Self Defence, and the Congress of Ukrainian Nationalists. (Note: Rudling writes: "After 1991, the OUN faced considerable difficulties re-establishing itself in independent Ukraine. It split between the Congress of Ukrainian Nationalists (KUN) in Ukraine and the émigré OUN(b), led by second-generation émigrés in Germany and Australia. Today, no fewer than four organizations claim to be the heirs to Stepan Bandera – KUN and the émigré OUN(b), the clandestine 'Tryzub imeni Bandery' ('Trident'), and VO Svoboda (Kuzio, 2011). The latter was initially founded in Lviv in 1991 as the Social-National Party of Ukraine through the merger of a number of ultranationalist organizations and student fraternities. Its ideology was inspired by Stets'ko's ideology of "two revolutions", one national and one social. As a party symbol, it chose a mirror image of the so-called Wolfsangel, or Wolf's hook, which was used by several SS divisions and, after the war, by neo-Nazi organizations. It organized a paramilitary guard and recruited skinheads and football hooligans into its ranks. Its appeal to Ukrainian voters was limited.") According to historian Per Anders Rudling, one of the reasons the role of the OUN remains contested in historiography is the fact that some of these later political inheritors developed literature justifying or denying the organization's fascist political heritage and collaboration with Nazi Germany. (Note: Rudling writes: "The OUN wings disagreed on strategy and ideology but shared a commitment to the manufacture of a historical past based on victimization and heroism. The émigrés developed an entire literature that denied the OUN's fascism, its collaboration with Nazi Germany, and its participation in atrocities, instead presenting the organization as composed of democrats and pluralists who had rescued Jews during the Holocaust. The diaspora narrative was contradictory, combining celebrations of the supposedly anti-Nazi resistance struggle of the OUN-UPA with celebrations of the 14th Waffen Grenadier Division of the SS (1st Galician) a Ukrainian collaborationist formation established by Heinrich Himmler in 1943 (Rudling, 2011a, 2011c, 2012a).")

On 1 October 2023, during the Defenders Day, Ukrainian President Volodymyr Zelenskyy handed honorary titles, insignia and battle flags to military units, including a ribbon of honorary name to the 131st separate reconnaissance battalion of the Ground Forces, named in honor of OUN founder Yevhen Konovalets.

== Symbols ==
Flag of OUN-M

The organization's symbols were established in 1932 and were published in a magazine 'Building a Nation' (Ukrainian: Розбудова Нації, Rozbudova Natsii). The author of the OUN emblem with a stylized trident (tryzub) was Robert Lisovskyi. The organization's anthem "We were born in a great hour" (Ukrainian: Зродились ми великої години) was finalized in 1934 and also was published in the same magazine. Its lyrics were written by Oles Babiy, and it music by composer Omelian Nyzhankivsky.

For a long time OUN did not officially have its own flag. However, during the Hungarian campaign against the Republic of Carpathian Ukraine in 1939, Carpathian Sich, a militarized wing of OUN, adopted its flag from the OUN's emblem – a golden trident on a blue background. The flag was finalized and officially adopted by the organization only in 1964 at the 5th Assembly of Ukrainian Nationalists. The blue and yellow colours have a strong association with Ukrainian nationalism, including the 1917 Ukrainian People's Republic.

Flag of UNA and OUN-B

When the organisation split in 1941, OUN-B refused to adopt the trident as a symbol and came up with its own heraldry. Lisovskyi created the organizational emblem for OUN-B as well. The central element of the new emblem was a stylized cross within a triangle. The flag and emblem consist of two colors: red and black. According to Bohdan Hoshovsky, the color combination of red and black was based on a concept of the OUN ideologue and veteran of the Ukrainian Galician Army Yulian Varanasi. According to some sources, the black color symbolizes the black earth ("Chornozem") that Ukraine is synonymous for, and the red color represents blood spilled for Ukraine. Rudling summarises this as symoblsing blood and soil. Others, such as Natalia Khanenko-Friesen, director of the Canadian Institute of Ukrainian Studies (and scholar of Ukrainian folklore), say the red is traditionally synonymous with "life" rather than with violence. "Blood as life, as blossom, and not as blood lost in battles." Jars Balan, head of the Ukrainian Canadian Studies Centre at the University of Alberta, says "The red is for love and the black is for sorrow and how they are intertwined", with references to those colours occurring in Slavic songs and poetry since the 12th century.

== Veteran status of OUN members ==
In late March 2019 former OUN combatants (and other living former members of irregular Ukrainian nationalist armed groups that were active during World War II and the first decade after the war) were officially granted the status of veterans. This meant that for the first time they could receive veteran benefits, including free public transport, subsidized medical services, annual monetary aid, and public utilities discounts (and will enjoy the same social benefits as former Ukrainian soldiers Red Army of the Soviet Union). There had been several previous attempts to provide former Ukrainian nationalist fighters with official veteran status, especially during the 2005–2009 administration of President Viktor Yushchenko, but all failed.

== Leaders ==
=== Early OUN ===
No.	Picture	Name (birth–death)	Time in office	Citizenship/allegiance
1		Yevhen Konovalets (1891–1938)	1929–1938	Austria-Hungary; Ukrainian People's Republic
2		Andriy Melnyk (1899–1964)	1938–1940	Austria-Hungary; Ukrainian People's Republic

=== OUN (Melnyk) ===
- Andriy Melnyk (1940–1964)
- Oleh Shtul (1964–1977)
- Denys Kvitkovskyi (1977–1979)
- Mykola Plaviuk (1979–2012)
- Bohdan Chervak (2012–present)

=== OUN (Bandera) ===
- Stepan Bandera (1940–1959)
  - acting: Mykola Lebed (September 1941 – May 1943)
  - acting: Roman Shukhevych (May 1943 – 1944)
- Stepan Lenkavskyi (1959–1968)
- Yaroslav Stetsko (1968–1986)
- Vasyl Oleskiv (1986–1991)
- Slava Stetsko (1991–2001)
- Andriy Haidamakha (2001–2009)
- Stefan Romaniw (2009–2022)
- Oleh Medunytsia (2022–present)

=== OUN (abroad) ===
- Zenon Matla (1954–1956)
- Lev Rebet (1956–1957)
- Roman Ilnytskyi (1957–?)
- Bohdan Kordyuk (?–1979)
- Daria Rebet (1979–1991)
- Anatol Kaminskyi (1991–present)

== Notable members and supporters ==
This is a list of notable members and supporters of the Organization of Ukrainian Nationalists.

- Volodymyr Bahaziy
- Ivan Bahrianyi
- Stepan Bandera
- Volodymyr Horbovy
- Ivan Hrynokh
- Olha Ilkiv
- Mykola Kapustiansky
- Yevhen Konovalets
- Zenon Kossak
- Vasyl Kuk
- Viktor Kurmanovych
- Yuriy Lopatynsky
- Oleh Medunytsia
- Andriy Melnyk
- Oleksander Ohloblyn
- Oleh Olzhych
- Mykola Plaviuk
- Stefan Romaniw
- Lev Shankovsky
- Volodymyr Stakhiv
- Yevhen Stakhiv
- Mykola Stasyuk
- Slava Stetsko
- Yaroslav Stetsko
- Mykola Stsiborskyi
- Vasyl Sydor
- Volodymyr Yaniv
- Richard Yary

== See also ==
- Warsaw Process

== Bibliography ==
- Armstrong, John (1963). Ukrainian Nationalism. New York: Columbia University Press.
- Breitman, Richard (1991). "Himmler and the 'Terrible Secret' among the Executioners". Journal of Contemporary History. 26 (3/4): 431–451. doi:10.1177/002200949102600305. ISSN 0022-0094. JSTOR 260654. S2CID 159733077.
- Gibiec, Magdalena (2024). Organisation of Ukrainian Nationalists on Emigration. Its Formation and Transnational Connections in 1929–1934. London: Routledge. doi:10.4324/9781003428954. ISBN 978-100-342-895-4.
- Gomza, I. (2015). Elusive Proteus: A study in the ideological morphology of the Organization of Ukrainian Nationalists. Communist and Post-Communist Studies, 48(2/3), 195–207.
- Himka, John Paul (2021). Ukrainian Nationalists and the Holocaust. Stuttgart: ibidem. ISBN 978-3-8382-1548-8.
- Himka, John Paul (2021), "John Paul Himka: What Were They Thinking? The Attitude of the Organization of Ukrainian Nationalists toward the Jews", in Dieckmann, Christoph; Zeltser, Arkadi (eds.), Distrust, Animosity, and Solidarity Jews and Non-Jews during the Holocaust in the USSR, Jerusalem: Yad Vashem, pp. 31–60, ISBN 978-965-308-644-9
- Himka, John Paul (2010). "The Organization of Ukrainian Nationalists and the Ukrainian Insurgent Army: Unwelcome Elements of an Identity Project". Ab Imperio. 2010 (4): 83–101. doi:10.1353/imp.2010.0101.
- Kasianov, Georgiy (2023). "Nationalist Memory Narratives and the Politics of History in Ukraine since the 1990s" (PDF). Nationalities Papers. 52 (6). Cambridge University Press.
- Kopstein, Jeffrey S. (3 December 2020). "Pogroms". Key Concepts in the Study of Antisemitism. Cham: Springer International Publishing. pp. 215–228. doi:10.1007/978-3-030-51658-1_17. ISBN 978-3-030-51657-4. S2CID 240643166.
- Jonathan Levy, The Intermarium: Wilson, Madison, & East Central European Federalism.
- Lower, Wendy (2012). "Axis collaboration, Operation Barbarossa, and the Holocaust in Ukraine". In Alex J. Kay; Jeff Rutherford; David Stahel (eds.). Nazi Policy on the Eastern Front, 1941: Total War, Genocide, and Radicalization. University of Rochester Press. ISBN 978-1-58046-407-9.
- Paul Robert Magocsi (1989), Morality and Reality: the Life and Times of Andrei Sheptytskyi, Edmonton Alberta: Canadian Institute of Ukrainian Studies, University of Alberta, ISBN 0-920862-68-3.
- McBride, Jared (2016). "Peasants into Perpetrators: The OUN-UPA and the Ethnic Cleansing of Volhynia, 1943–1944". Slavic Review. 75 (3): 630–654. doi:10.5612/slavicreview.75.3.063 (inactive 1 July 2025).
- Marchuk, Ihor (2012). Ростислав Волишин [Rostyslav Volyshyn] (in Ukrainian). Toronto, Lviv: Litopys UPA. p. 128. ISBN 978-1-897431-41-2.
- Marples, David R. (2007). Heroes and Villains: Creating National History in Contemporary Ukraine. Budapest, New York: Central European University Press. p. 386. doi:10.1515/9786155211355. ISBN 9786155211355. JSTOR 10.7829/j.ctt2jbn86. LCCN 2008028692.
- Motyka, Grzegor (2005), Służby bezpieczeństwa Polski i Czechosłowacji wobec Ukraińców (1945–1989), Instytut Pamięci Narodowej, Warsaw, ISBN 83-89078-86-4. (in Polish)
- Motyka, Grzegorz (2006). Ukraińska partyzantka 1942–1960. Działalność Organizacji Ukraińskich Nacjonalistów i Ukraińskiej Powstańczej Armii [Ukrainian partisans 1942–1960. Activities of the Organization of Ukrainian Nationalists and the Ukrainian Insurgent Army] (in Polish). Warsaw.
- Motyka, Grzegorz (11 November 2022). From the Volhynian Massacre to Operation Vistula: The Polish-Ukrainian Conflict 1943–1947. FOKUS. Vol. 6. Paderborn: Brill Publishers. p. 321. ISBN 9783657795376. ISSN 2698-5020. LCCN 2023400821.
- Motyl, Alexander J. (1980). The turn to the right : the ideological origins and development of Ukrainian nationalism, 1919-1929. East European monograph series. Vol. 65. New York: Columbia University Press. ISBN 9780914710585.
- Panchenko, Volodymyr (2011). Ekonomichna stratehiia OUN 1920-1950-ti rr.: rozrobka ta realizatsiia [The Economic Strategy of the OUN 1920-1950s: Development and Implementation]. Kyiv: PP Natalia Brekhunenko. ISBN 9789660260108.
- Rossoliński-Liebe, Grzegorz (2011). "The 'Ukrainian National Revolution' of 1941. Discourse and Practice of a Fascist Movement". Kritika: Explorations in Russian and Eurasian History. 12 (1): 83–114. doi:10.1353/kri.2011.a411661.
- Rossoliński-Liebe, Grzegorz (2012). "Debating, Obfuscating and Disciplining the Holocaust: Post-Soviet Historical Discourses on the OUN-UPA and other Nationalist Movements". East European Jewish Affairs. 42 (3): 199–241. doi:10.1080/13501674.2012.730732.
- Rossoliński-Liebe, Grzegorz (2014). Stepan Bandera: The Life and Afterlife of a Ukrainian Nationalist: Fascism, Genocide, and Cult. Columbia University Press. ISBN 978-3838266848.
- Rossolinski-Liebe, Gregorz (2015). The Fascist Kernel of Ukrainian Genocidal Nationalism. The Carl Beck Papers in Russian and East European Studies. Vol. 2402. Pittsburgh: The Center for Russian and East European Studies. doi:10.5195/cbp.2015.204.
- Rossoliński-Liebe, Grzegorz (2019). Inter-Fascist Conflicts in East Central Europe: The Nazis, the “Austrofascists,” the Iron Guard, and the Organization of Ukrainian Nationalists. In G. Rossoliński-Liebe & A. Bauerkämper (Eds.), Fascism without Borders: Transnational Connections and Cooperation between Movements and Regimes in Europe from 1918 to 1945 (1st ed., pp. 168–191). Berghahn Books.
- Rudling, Per Anders (2011). "The OUN, the UPA and the Holocaust: A Study in the Manufacturing of Historical Myths". The Carl Beck Papers in Russian and East European Studies. Carl Beck Papers. 2107 (2107). doi:10.5195/cbp.2011.164.
- Rudling, Per Anders (2019). "Eugenics and racial anthropology in the Ukrainian radical nationalist tradition". Science in Context. 32 (1): 67–91. doi:10.1017/S0269889719000048. hdl:2043/30799. PMID 31124775.
- Rudling, Per Anders (2024), Tarnished Heroes. The Organization of Ukrainian Nationalists in the Memory Politics of Post-Soviet Ukraine, Köln: ibidem, ISBN 978-3-8382-0999-9
- Shkandrij, M. (2015). The Organization of Ukrainian Nationalists. In Ukrainian Nationalism: Politics, Ideology, and Literature, 1929–1956 (pp. 101–132). Yale University Press.
- Siemaszko Władysław, Siemaszko Ewa (2000), Ludobójstwo dokonane przez nacjonalistów ukraińskich na ludności polskiej Wołynia 1939–1945, Kancelaria Prezydenta Rzeczpospolitej Polskiej, Warsaw, tom I i II, 1,433 pages, photos, quells, ISBN 83-87689-34-3. (in Polish)
- Snyder, Timothy (2003). "The Causes of Ukrainian-Polish Ethnic Cleansing 1943" (PDF). Past & Present (179): 197–234. doi:10.1093/past/179.1.197.
- Subtelny Orest, Ukraine: A History, Toronto: University of Toronto Press, 1988, ISBN 0-8020-5808-6.
- Wilson, Andrew (1996). Ukrainian Nationalism in the 1990s: A Minority Faith. Cambridge: Cambridge University Press. ISBN 978-052-157-457-0.
- Wilson Andrew, The Ukrainians: Unexpected Nation, New Haven: Yale University Press, 2000, ISBN 0-300-08355-6.
- Миколайович Антонюк Ярослав, "СБ ОУН на Волині." Луцьк : «Волинська книга», 2007. – 176 с.
- Миколайович Антонюк Ярослав, "СБ ОУН(б) на Волині таЗахідному Поліссі (1946–1951)" : Монографія. – Луцьк: «Надстир'я-Ключі», 2013. – 228 с.
- Zaitsev, Oleksandr (2021). "Integral Nationalism in the Absence of a Nation-State". In Bresciani, Marco (ed.). Conservatives and Right Radicals in Interwar Europe. Abingdon, Oxfordshire: Routledge. pp. 118–142.
