= Svirzh =

Svirzh may refer to:

== Geography ==
- Svirzh (Desna), tributary of Desna
- Svirzh (Dnieper), tributary of Dnieper

== Places ==
- Svirzh, Lviv Oblast, village in Lviv Raion
  - Svirzh Castle, castle in the above village
- Svirzh, Sumy Oblast, village in Shostka Raion
