= Dunaiv =

Rural locality in Lviv Oblast, Ukraine

Dunaiv Дунаїв
- Village
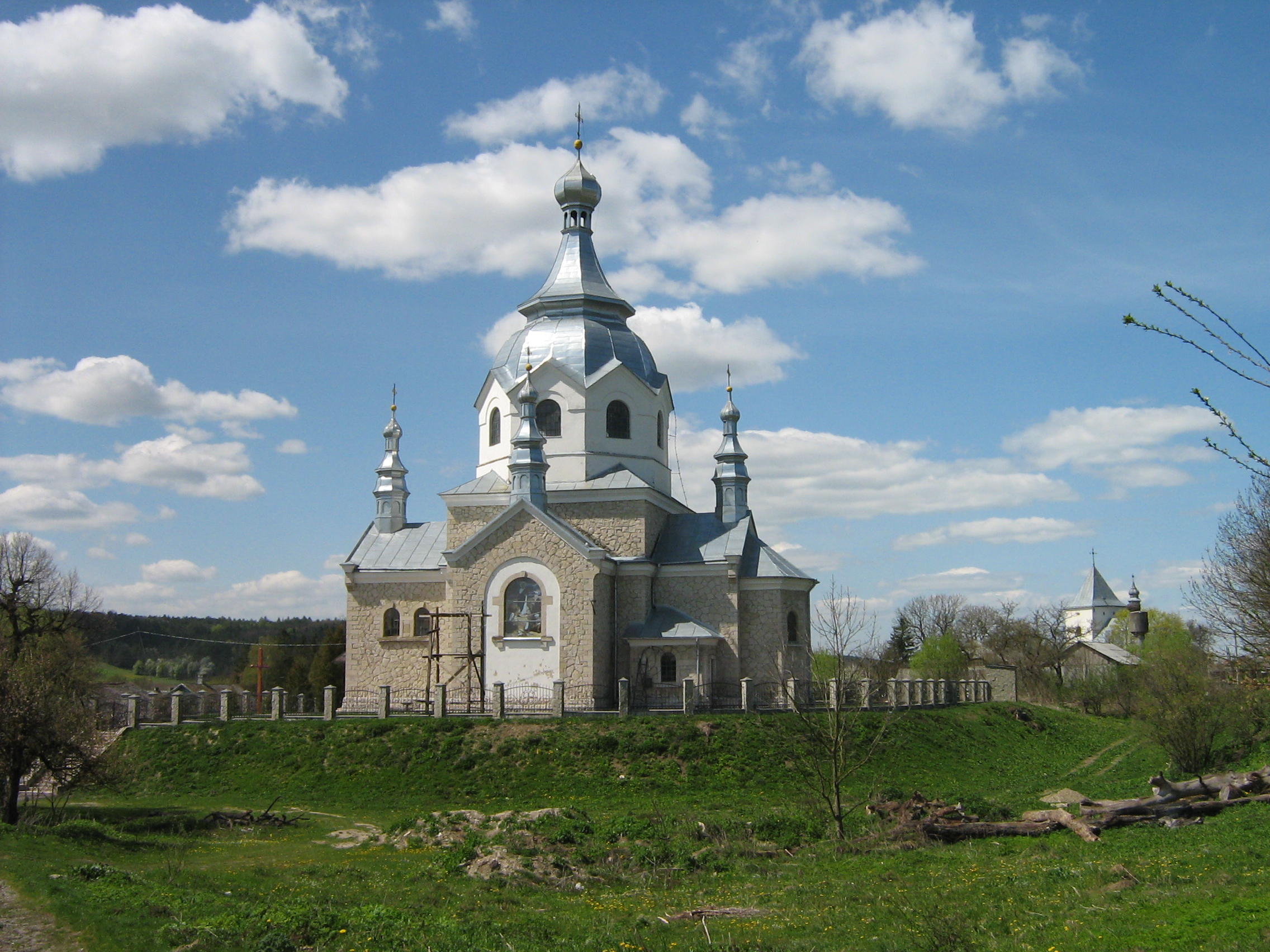
- Church of the Nativity of Theotokos

- Coat of arms

- Location within Lviv Oblast
- Coordinates: 49°37′00″N 24°49′25″E
- Country: Ukraine
- Oblast: Lviv Oblast
- District: Lviv Raion
- Established: 1386

Area
  - Total: 284 km^{2} (110 sq mi)
- Elevation /(average value of): 307 m (1,007 ft)

Population
  - Total: 683
  - Density: 24,049/km^{2} (62,290/sq mi)
- Time zone: UTC+2 (EET)
  - Summer (DST): UTC+3 (EEST)
- Postal code: 81234
- Area code: +380 3263
- Website: село Дунаїв ^{(Ukrainian)}

Dunaiv (Ukrainian: Дуна́їв) is a village in Lviv Raion, Lviv Oblast in western Ukraine. Local government is administered by Dunaivska village council. It belongs to Peremyshliany urban hromada, one of the hromadas of Ukraine. Area of the village totals is 2.84 km^{2} and the population of village is 683 persons.

== Geography ==
The village is located in the Peremyshlianskyi district (Peremyshliany Raion) on the border of the Ternopil Oblast. It is situated in the distance 74 kilometres (46 mi) from the regional center of Lviv, 24 kilometres (15 mi) from the district center Peremyshliany, and 64 kilometres (40 mi) from Ternopil. Dunaiv stands upon the Zolota Lypa river and belongs to the historical area of Galician Podolia.

== History ==
The first known written reference – July 15, 1386. Governor of Galicia–Volhynia Vladyslav Opolchyk gave the village an everlasting possession.

In 1413 was founded the Catholic church parish in Dunaiv. The diocese was canonically erected on August 28, 1412 by Pope Gregory XII.

Until 18 July 2020, Dunaiv belonged to Peremyshliany Raion. The raion was abolished in July 2020 as part of the administrative reform of Ukraine, which reduced the number of raions of Lviv Oblast to seven. The area of Peremyshliany Raion was merged into Lviv Raion.

== Monuments of architecture ==
Architectural monuments of the Peremyshliany Raion are located in the village Dunaiv:

- Saint Stanislaus church in Dunaiv (stone) 1485, 1585 (433)
- Church of the Nativity Blessed Virgin Mary (20th century), Dunaiv (2336-М)
- Palace of the 20th century (488-М)

== Literature ==
- Ukrainian: Історія міст і сіл УРСР : Львівська область. – К. : ГРУРЕ, 1968 р. Page 370
