= Volove =

Rural locality in Lviv Oblast, Ukraine

Volove Волове
- Village
- Location within Lviv Oblast Location within Ukraine
- Coordinates: 49.6647°N 24.3064°E
- Country: Ukraine
- Oblast: Lviv Oblast
- Raion: Lviv Raion

Volove (Ukrainian: Волове) is a village in Lviv Raion, Lviv Oblast, Ukraine. It belongs to Bibrka urban hromada, one of the hromadas of Ukraine. Volove has 325 inhabitants.

== History ==
Volove was first mentioned in 1445.

In April 1943, the ghetto of the nearby village of Bibrka was liquidated; this followed the mass deportation of the majority of its Jewish inhabitants to the Belzec extermination camp. Upon its liquidation, the occupying Einsatzgruppen selected 159 individuals for work, sending the remaining 1,000 prisoners to Volove and executing them en masse.

Until 18 July 2020, Volove belonged to Peremyshliany Raion. The raion was abolished in July 2020 as part of the administrative reform of Ukraine, which reduced the number of raions of Lviv Oblast to seven. The area of Peremyshliany Raion was merged into Lviv Raion.
