= Natalka Prystai-Ohonovska =

Ukrainian painter (1899–1969)

- Наталка Олексівна Пристай-Огоновська
- Born: Natalka Oleksiivna Prystai-Ohonovska; 10 June 1899; Lahodiv, Austria-Hungary (now Ukraine)
- Died: 26 February 1969 (aged 69); Lviv
- Education: University of Vienna

Natalka Oleksiivna Prystai-Ohonovska (Ukrainian: Наталка Олексівна Пристай-Огоновська; 10 June 1899 – 26 February 1969) was a Ukrainian painter.

== Biography ==
Natalka Prystai was born on 10 June 1899 in Lahodiv, Peremyshliany Powiat, now the Peremyshliany urban hromada, Lviv Raion, Lviv Oblast, Ukraine.

Studied at the Ukrainian Women's Gymnasium of the Basilian Sisters in Lviv (1917), graduated from the Faculty of Philosophy at the University of Vienna (1926).

During the World War I, she worked for the Ukrainian Women's Society for Assistance to the Ukrainian Sich Riflemen.

In 1939–1941, she taught Ukrainian at the Lviv Conservatory, and in 1944–1964, she taught English at the Lviv Medical Institute.

Died on 26 February 1969 in Lviv. She was buried at the Yaniv Cemetery.

== Creativity ==
Attended Oleksa Novakivskyi's drawing studio and private lectures. In March 1923, she was one of the first five students of his Oleksa Novakivskyi Art School.

Prystai-Ohonovska works include embroideries; oil and drawing compositions preserved in private collections of Lviv residents.

Among his works:

- "Kvity" (1918),
- "Posmertnyi portret dida Bachynskoho" (1922),
- "Avtoportret na tli vesnianykh kvitiv" (1923).

The works were exhibited during the exhibition at the National Museum in Lviv, which was dedicated to the 75th anniversary of the foundation of the Oleksa Novakivskyi Art School (1998).

== Bibliography ==
- L. Voloshyn (2024). "Пристай-Огоновська Наталка". Мистецька школа Олекси Новаківського 1923-1935. Життя у перспективі часу (in Ukrainian). Lviv–Drohobych: Kolo. p. 416—417. ISBN 978-617-642-676-9.
