= Lahodiv, Lviv Raion, Lviv Oblast =

Rural locality in Lviv Oblast, Ukraine

Lahodiv Лагодів
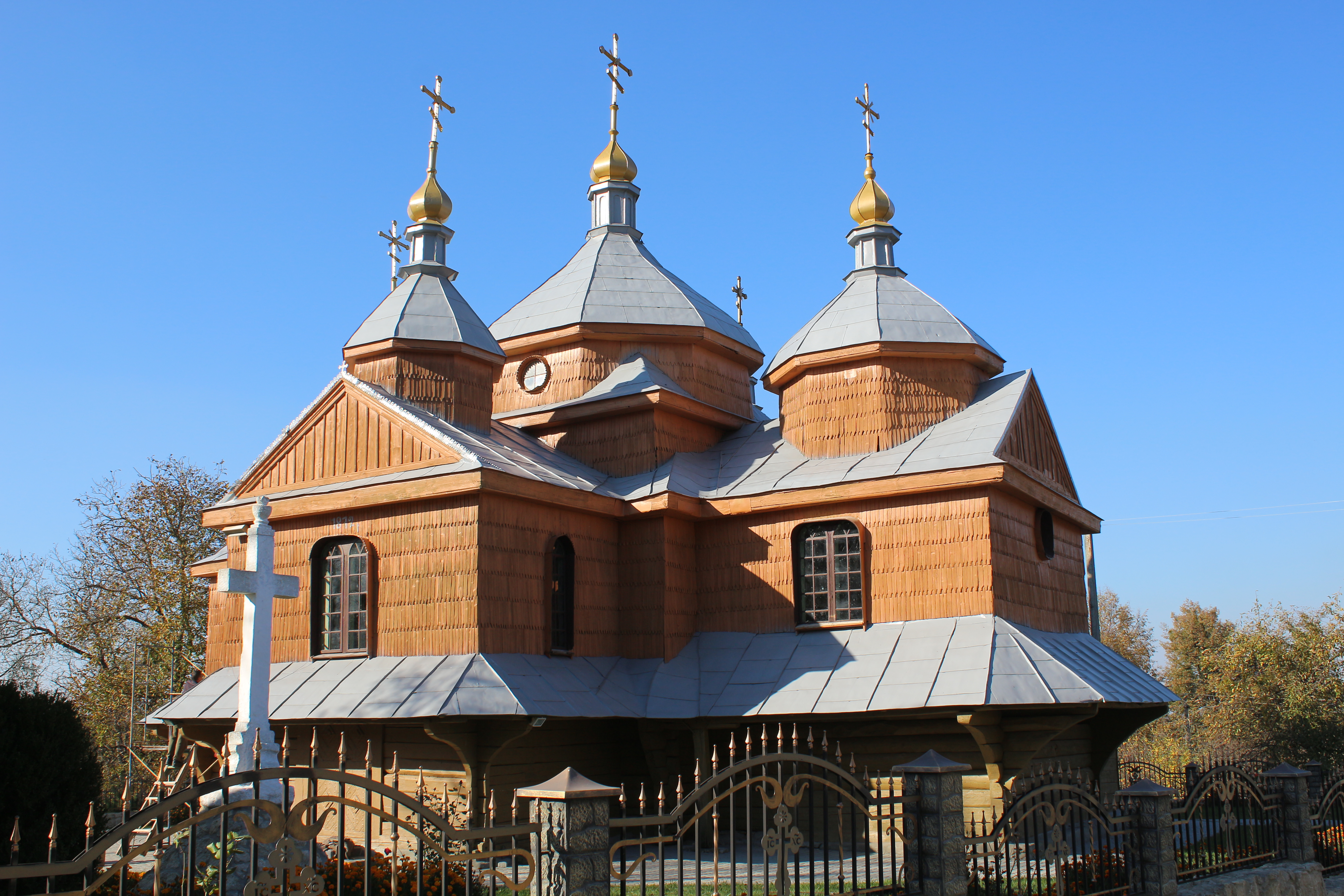
- St. Michael's Church

- Location in Lviv Oblast Lahodiv (Ukraine)
- Coordinates: 49°43′44″N 24°31′1″E
- Country: Ukraine
- Oblast: Lviv Oblast
- Raion: Lviv Raion
- Hromada: Peremyshliany urban hromada
- Time zone: UTC+2 (EET)
  - Summer (DST): UTC+3 (EEST)
- Postal code: 81212

Lahodiv (Ukrainian: Лагодів) is a village in the Peremyshliany urban hromada of the Lviv Raion of Lviv Oblast in Ukraine.

== History ==
The first written mention of the village was in 1440.

On 19 July 2020, as a result of the administrative-territorial reform and liquidation of the Peremyshliany Raion, the village became part of the Lviv Raion.

== Religion ==
- Saint Michael church (wooden, 18th century)

== Notable residents ==
- Natalka Prystai-Ohonovska (1899–1969), Ukrainian painter

== Sources ==
- "Łahodów 2.), pow. przemyślański". Geographical Dictionary of the Kingdom of Poland (in Polish). 5. Warszawa: Kasa im. Józefa Mianowskiego. 1884. p. 575.
- "Załuka, wieś w pow. przemyślański, 2.) obecnie Łahodów". Geographical Dictionary of the Kingdom of Poland (in Polish). 14. Warszawa: Kasa im. Józefa Mianowskiego. 1895. p. 358.
