= Svirzh, Lviv Oblast =

Village in Lviv Oblast, Ukraine

Svirzh Свірж Świrz
- Village
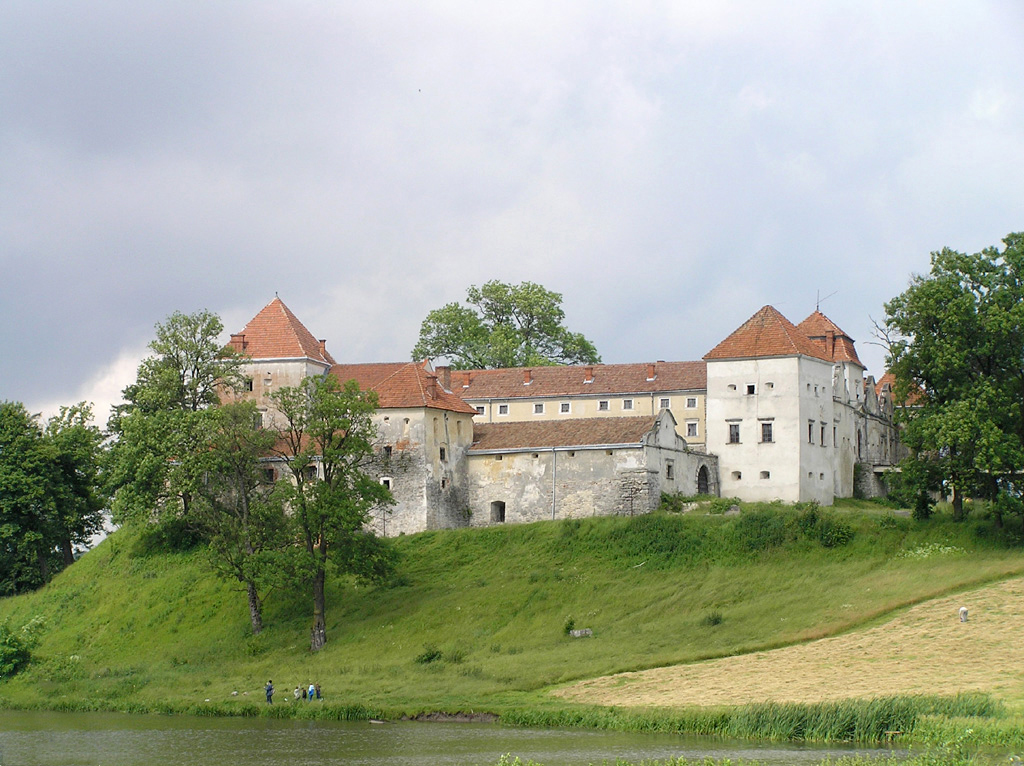
- Svirzh Castle

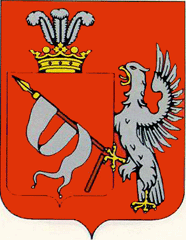
- Coat of arms

- Location within Lviv Oblast Location within Ukraine
- Coordinates: 49°39′00″N 24°26′20″E
- Country: Ukraine
- Oblast: Lviv Oblast
- Raion: Lviv Raion
- Hromada: Bibrka urban hromada
- Elevation: 337 m (1,106 ft)

Population (2001)
  - Total: 795
- Time zone: GMT+2
- Postal code: 81225
- Area code: +380 3263

Svirzh (Ukrainian: Свірж; Polish: Świrz) is a village located in Lviv Raion of Lviv Oblast (region) in western Ukraine. It belongs to Bibrka urban hromada, one of the hromadas of Ukraine.

== History ==
Svirzh was first mentioned in 1416 as Szwyrzsz, and then later as Swerz (1443), Swyrz (1456), Swierz (1578) and so on. It initially belonged to the Lwów Land in the Ruthenian Voivodeship of the Polish–Lithuanian Commonwealth and to the Świrski noble family and was referred to as an oppidum (market town).

In 1484, Andrzej and Marcin Świrski established a Roman Catholic parish. In 1581, the new brick church was built. The castle was built in the 16th century. The Cetner noble family ruled in the village in the middle of the 16th century.

During the First Partition of Poland in 1772, the village became part of the new Kingdom of Galicia and Lodomeria of the Austrian Empire (from 1804). In the 19th century, the village had many owners: Sierakowski, Straczewski, Pierzchała, Wiktor, Iliasiewicz, Czaykowski, Tustanowski and Krzeczunowicz. In the early 20th century, the village of Irena (Wolański) Pinińska, whose second husband was Mr. Robert Lamezan de Salins, a general in the Austrian and Polish armies. The last noble owner was the general's daughter, Irena, and her husband, Tadeusz Bór-Komorowski.

In 1900, the municipality of Świrz had 389 houses with 2346 inhabitants, of which 1913 were Polish speakers, 421 were Ruthenian speakers, 1575 were Roman Catholic, 418 were Greek Catholic, 352 were Jews, and 1 were of another faith.

After the end of the Polish-Ukrainian War in 1919, the village became part of the Second Polish Republic. In 1921, Świrz had 405 houses with 2293 inhabitants, of which 2174 Poles, 109 Ruthenians, 7 Jews (nationality), 3 other nationalities, 1894 Roman Catholics, 215 Greek Catholics, 184 Jews (religion).

During World War II, after the Soviet invasion of Poland, Svirzh first belonged to the Soviet Union and from 1941, after the conquest by the German Wehrmacht, to the General Government under German control. In 1944, 14 Poles were killed by a subgroup of the organization of Ukrainian nationalists, OUN-UPA. On 18 July 1944, in Operation Burza, a German fleet of vehicles was attacked by the Home Army and 40 people in the escort were killed. The region was reannexed by the Soviet Union in 1945.

Until 18 July 2020, Svirzh belonged to Peremyshliany Raion. The raion was abolished in July 2020 as part of the administrative reform of Ukraine, which reduced the number of raions of Lviv Oblast to seven. The area of Peremyshliany Raion was merged into Lviv Raion.

== Main sights ==
- Svirzh Castle

== Notable people ==
- Anytchka (born 1977), singer
- Alicja Grześkowiak (born 1941), politician, Marshal of the Senate of Poland (1997-2001)
