= Novi Strilyshcha =

Rural locality in Lviv Oblast, Ukraine

Novi Strilyshcha Нові Стрілища Strzeliska Nowe Новые Стрелища
- Rural settlement
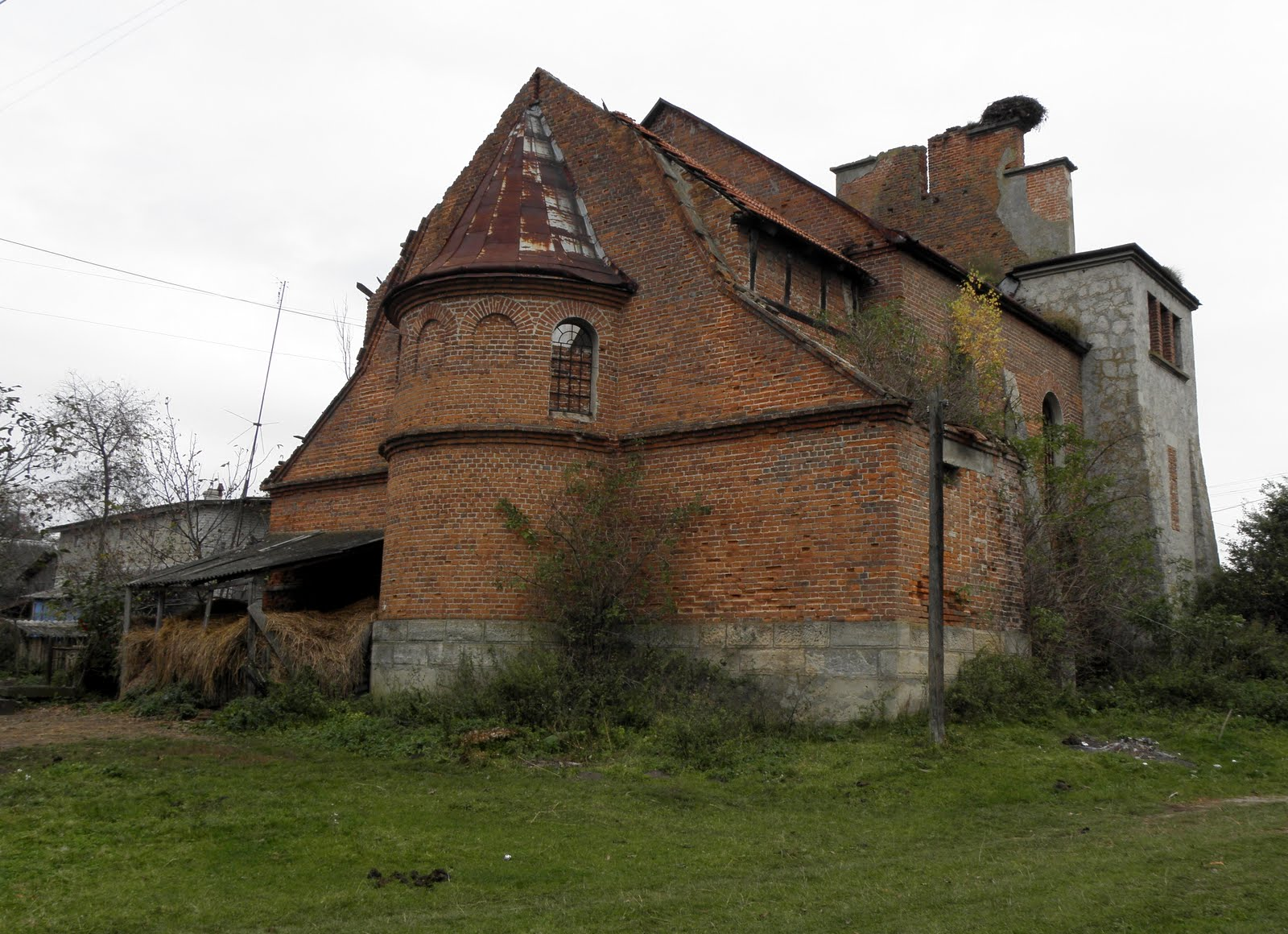

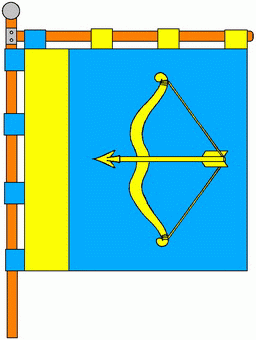
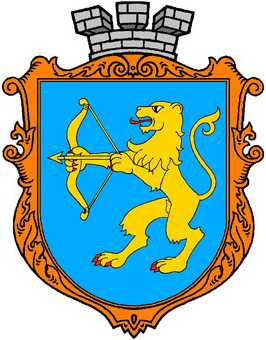
- Flag Coat of arms

- Location of Novi Strilyshcha Novi Strilyshcha (Ukraine)
- Coordinates: 49°31′N 24°24′E
- Country: Ukraine
- Oblast: Lviv Oblast
- Raion: Lviv Raion
- Hromada: Bibrka urban hromada

Area
  - Total: 249 km^{2} (96 sq mi)

Population (2022)
  - Total: 774
- Area code: +380 3239

Novi Strilyshcha (Ukrainian: Нові Стрілища; Polish: Strzeliska Nowe; Yiddish: סטרעליסק, romanized: Strelisk) is a rural settlement in Lviv Raion, Lviv Oblast, western Ukraine. It belongs to Bibrka urban hromada, one of the hromadas of Ukraine. Its local government is administered by Novi Strilyshcha settlement council. Population: 774 (2022 estimate).

== History ==
The first written mention of which dates from the year 1375, still just Strilyshcha (now the village of Stari Strilyshcha) who were on the verge of a border settlement between Galician and Zvenyhorod principalities.

In 1513, new settlement was separated from Strilyshcha and named Novi Strilyshcha. Thanks to the convenient location on the trade route from Bibrka to Rohatyn town began to grow, getting the right to hold four annual fairs and weekly markets. In the 17th century Novi Strilyshcha even enjoyed municipal rights.

During the Soviet era to 1959, were subregional center in Drohobych Oblast.

Up to now there have preserved the 17th-century church and the Church of the Assumption of the Blessed Virgin. Nearby the village is a museum of the Ukrainian Insurgent Army (UPA), dedicated to hundreds of Siromantsi (a unit of the UPA) and specially to a native of Strilyshcha, Mykola Lebed.

Until 18 July 2020, Novi Strilyshcha belonged to Zhydachiv Raion. The raion was abolished in July 2020 as part of the administrative reform of Ukraine, which reduced the number of raions of Lviv Oblast to seven. The area of Zhydachiv Raion was merged into Stryi Raion, however, Novi Strilyshcha was transferred to Lviv Raion.

Until 26 January 2024, Novi Strilyshcha was designated urban-type settlement. On this day, a new law entered into force which abolished this status, and Novi Strilyshcha became a rural settlement.
