= Mezhyhirya =

Mezhyhirya or Mezhyhiria (Ukrainian: Межигір'я) is a toponym of Ukrainian origin which means land between mounts or land between hills.

It can refer to:

- Mezhyhirya Monastery, a destroyed monastery in Kyiv Oblast
- Mezhyhirya ravine, located in Kyiv Oblast
- Mezhyhirya (residence), a former private residence of former Ukrainian President Viktor Yanukovych in Novi Petrivtsi, Vyshhorod Raion
- Mezhyhiria, a village in Sambir Raion, Lviv Oblast
- Mezhyhiria, a village in Chortkiv Raion, Ternopil Oblast

== See also ==
- Mizhhiria, a similar toponym
  - Mizhhiria, an urban-type settlement in Zakarpattia Oblast of western Ukraine
  - Mizhhiria (formerly Baqsan), a village in Zelenohirske community, Bilohirsk Raion
  - Mizhhiria, a village in Markovychi community, Lokachi Raion
  - Mizhhiria, a village of Ivano-Frankivsk Oblast
  - Mizhhiria, a village in Syvky community, Shepetivka Raion, Khmelnytskyi Oblast
  - Univ (until 2003 Mizhhiria), a village in Korosne community, Lviv Raion, Lviv Oblast
  - Mizhhiria, a small village of seven people in Chapayevka community, Poltava Raion, Poltava Oblast
  - Monastyrok (until 1992 Mizhhiria), a village in Bilche-Zolote community, Chortkiv Raion, Ternopil Oblast
- Međugorje, Bosnia and Herzegovina (name derived from the same Slavic roots)
