= Pidvysoke =

Pidvysoke (Ukrainian: Підвисоке) may refer to the following places in Ukraine:

- Pidvysoke, Ivano-Frankivsk Oblast, a village in Kolomyia Raion, Ivano-Frankivsk Oblast
- Pidvysoke, Borova settlement hromada, Izium Raion, Kharkiv Oblast, a village in Izium Raion, Kharkiv Oblast
- Pidvysoke, Kunie rural hromada, Izium Raion, Kharkiv Oblast, a village in Izium Raion, Kharkiv Oblast
- Pidvysoke, Kirovohrad Oblast, a village in Holovanivsk Raion, Kirovohrad Oblast
- Pidvysoke, Lviv Oblast, a village in Lviv Raion, Lviv Oblast
- Pidvysoke, Rivne Oblast, a village in Dubno Raion, Rivne Oblast
- Pidvysoke, Ternopil Oblast, a village in Ternopil Raion, Ternopil Oblast
- Pidvysoke, Vinnytsia Oblast, a village in Vinnytsia Raion, Vinnytsia Oblast
