= Robert Lamezan de Salins =

Polish military officer (1869–1930)

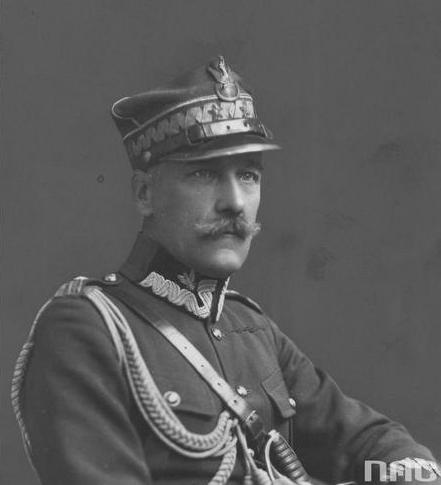
- Born: 14 August 1869; Mödling, Austria-Hungary
- Died: 29 November 1930 (aged 61); Lwów, Poland
- Military career
- Allegiance: Austria-Hungary (to 1918); Poland
- Branch: Heer
- Service years: 1890–18 (Austria); 1918–26 (Poland)
- Rank: Major General (Austria) generał dywizji (Poland)
- Commands: South-Eastern Front
- Conflicts: World War I Polish–Soviet War

Robert Lamezan de Salins (1869–1930), also known as Robert Graf von Lamezan-Salins, was a Polish military officer and diplomat of aristocratic descent.

An heir to a mighty Austro-Hungarian family of distant French roots (his ancestors came to Austria in 1709), Robert Franz Lamezan-Salins was born August 14, 1869, in Mödling near Vienna to Eduard Graf Lamezan-Salins, a notable statesman and lawyer, president of district court for Vienna and founder of Austrian Olympic Committee. His grandfather was another Austrian general, Anton Graf von Lamezan-Salins.

In 1890 Robert Lamezan-Salins joined the Austro-Hungarian Army and initially served as an NCO in the 6th Dragoon Regiment. Stationed in predominantly Polish Galicia, in 1903 he married Irena Countess Wolańska of the Przyjaciel coat of arms, heiress of a Polish aristocratic family. He graduated from the General Staff Academy and rose to the rank of lieutenant colonel (Oberstleutnant) in 1911. Promoted to full colonel at the outbreak of the Great War, he served as a commanding officer of a cavalry regiment and then cavalry brigade.

Following the end of World War I and the dissolution of Austria-Hungary, in December 1918 he joined the Polish Army and was accepted in the rank of Brigadier General. Although officially in active service, initially he served as a diplomat, heading Polish military missions to Bucharest (where he negotiated the return of the Romanian-held region of Pokutia to Poland) and Berlin, and as a liaison to Inter-Allied Military Mission to Eastern Lesser Poland during the Polish-Ukrainian War. Following his return from Berlin in December 1919 he briefly served as the commanding officer of the 12th Infantry Division, but was dismissed as early as January 1920 and headed the Polish military mission charged with taking over the region of Pomerania from German administration. In this capacity he took part in Poland's Wedding to the Sea ceremony.

In March 1920 he became the commanding officer of the Lwów Corps Area (military administration of the city of Lwów and its region) and in August and September of that year he briefly commanded the entire South-Western Front of the Polish Army, as well as the 6th Army. Due to health problems he was dismissed from service in August 1921 and the following year he was honourably discharged. He briefly returned to active duty in 1923, but was again discharged in 1926. According to his post-war evaluation by Marshal Józef Piłsudski, he was a mediocre commander at best. "Completely inept at operational level in my honest opinion. His command would always be very, very bad. In dire need he could be used as a corps commanding officer, but – God forbid – not in Galicia, where he would instantly become victim of his numerous friends, colleagues and relatives. Easy-going, he is best used in diplomatic missions, but rather those, where observation rather than action or character are needed".

He settled in his family's manor in Świrz near Przemyślany. He died in Lwów November 29, 1930. A couple of months prior to his death his daughter Irena married another Polish military officer, Tadeusz Komorowski, who later became the Commander-in-Chief of Polish Armed Forces.
