= Vyshnivchyk, Lviv Oblast =

Rural locality in Lviv Oblast, Ukraine

Vyshnivchyk Вишнівчик
- Location in Lviv Oblast
- Coordinates: 49°41′50″N 24°44′47″E
- Country: Ukraine
- Oblast: Lviv Oblast
- Raion: Lviv Raion
- Hromada: Peremyshliany urban hromada
- Time zone: UTC+2 (EET)
  - Summer (DST): UTC+3 (EEST)
- Postal code: 81233

Vyshnivchyk (Ukrainian: Вишнівчик) is a village in the Peremyshliany urban hromada of the Lviv Raion of Lviv Oblast in Ukraine.

== History ==
The first written mention of the village was in 1389.

After the liquidation of the Peremyshliany Raion on 19 July 2020, the village became part of the Lviv Raion.

== Religion ==
- St. Michael church (1896),
- Roman Catholic Church of the Assumption (1930).

== Notable residents ==
- Olena Stepaniv (1892–1963), Austro-Hungarian and Ukrainian soldier, public figure and economist. She is popularly known as the first female officer in the Ukrainian army

== Sources ==
- "Wiśniowczyk, 2.) wś, powiat przemyślański". Geographical Dictionary of the Kingdom of Poland (in Polish). 13. Warszawa: Kasa im. Józefa Mianowskiego. 1893. p. 614.
