= Univ, Ukraine =

Rural locality in Lviv Oblast, Ukraine

Univ Унів
- Village
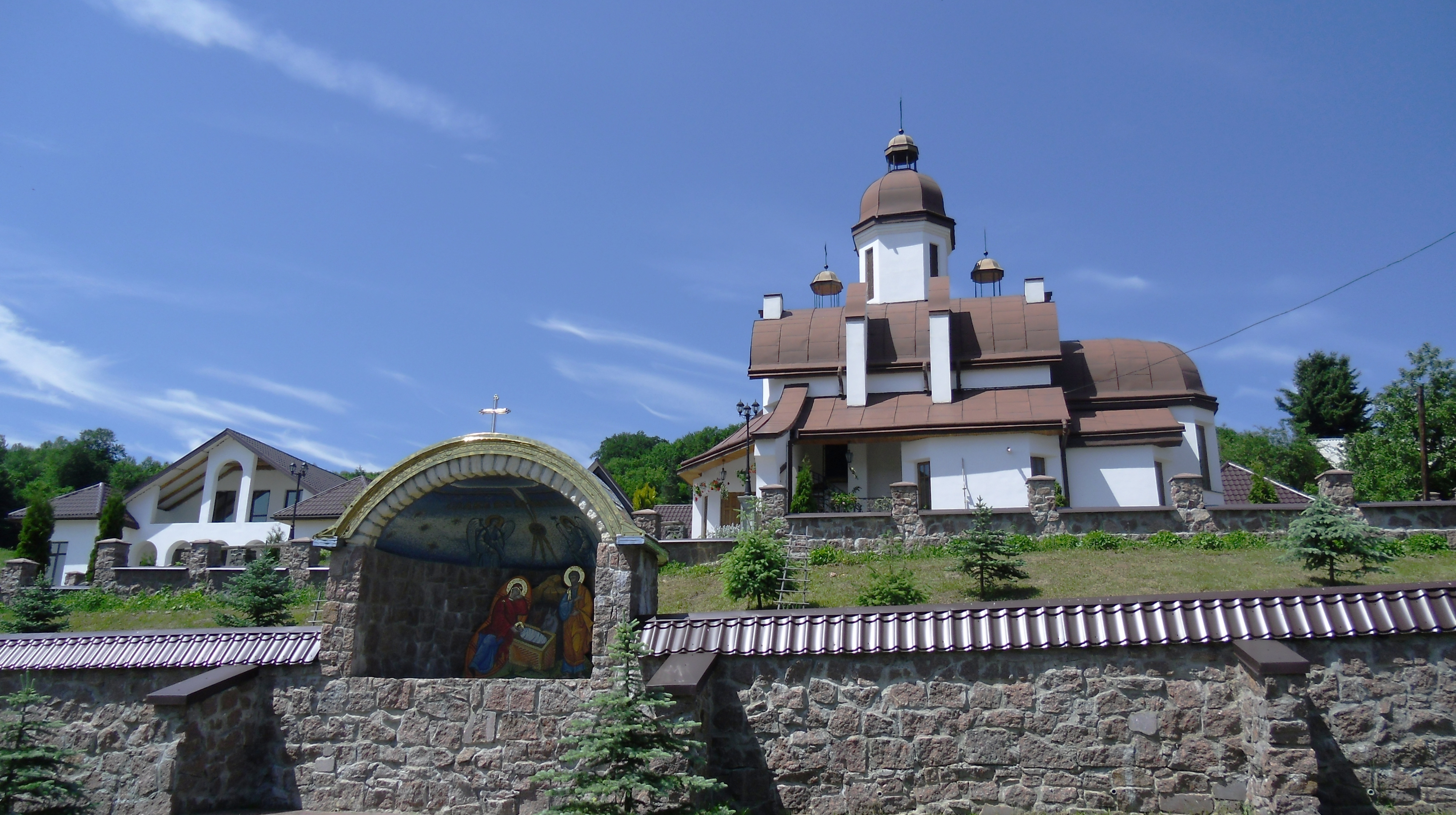
- Ascension Church
- Interactive map of Univ
- Location within Lviv Oblast Location within Ukraine
- Coordinates: 49°42′43″N 24°35′29″E
- Country: Ukraine
- Oblast: Lviv Oblast
- Raion: Lviv Raion
- Hromada: Peremyshliany urban hromada
- Established: 14th century

Area
  - Total: 3.04 km^{2} (1.17 sq mi)
- Elevation /(average value of): 301 m (988 ft)

Population
  - Total: 468
  - Density: 154/km^{2} (399/sq mi)
- Time zone: UTC+2 (EET)
  - Summer (DST): UTC+3 (EEST)
- Postal code: 81216
- Area code: +380 3263
- Website: село Унів ^{(Ukrainian)}

Univ (Ukrainian: Унів), prior to 2003 known as Mizhhiria (Міжгір'я), is a village (selo) located in Lviv Raion, Lviv Oblast of Western Ukraine at a distance 7 kilometres (4.3 mi) from the city of Peremyshliany and 48 kilometres (30 mi) from the regional center of Lviv. It belongs to Peremyshliany urban hromada, one of the hromadas of Ukraine.

The population is about 468 persons and local government is administered by Korosno Village Council. The village covers an area of 3,04 km^{2} at an altitude of 301 metres (990 ft) above sea level.

== History and Attractions ==
This countryside is an owner of one of the greatest Christian shrines in Galicia—the Univ Holy Dormition Lavra of the Studite Rite. The first mention in archived documents dated back to 16th century, where the Univ is mentioned as well-known spiritual center of Galicia. Church of the Assumption of the Holy Virgin is a dominant building of a monastery ensemble. There are a Temple of the Ascension of the Lord UGCC in the village Univ.

Until 18 July 2020, Univ belonged to Peremyshliany Raion. The raion was abolished in July 2020 as part of the administrative reform of Ukraine, which reduced the number of raions of Lviv Oblast to seven. The area of Peremyshliany Raion was merged into Lviv Raion.

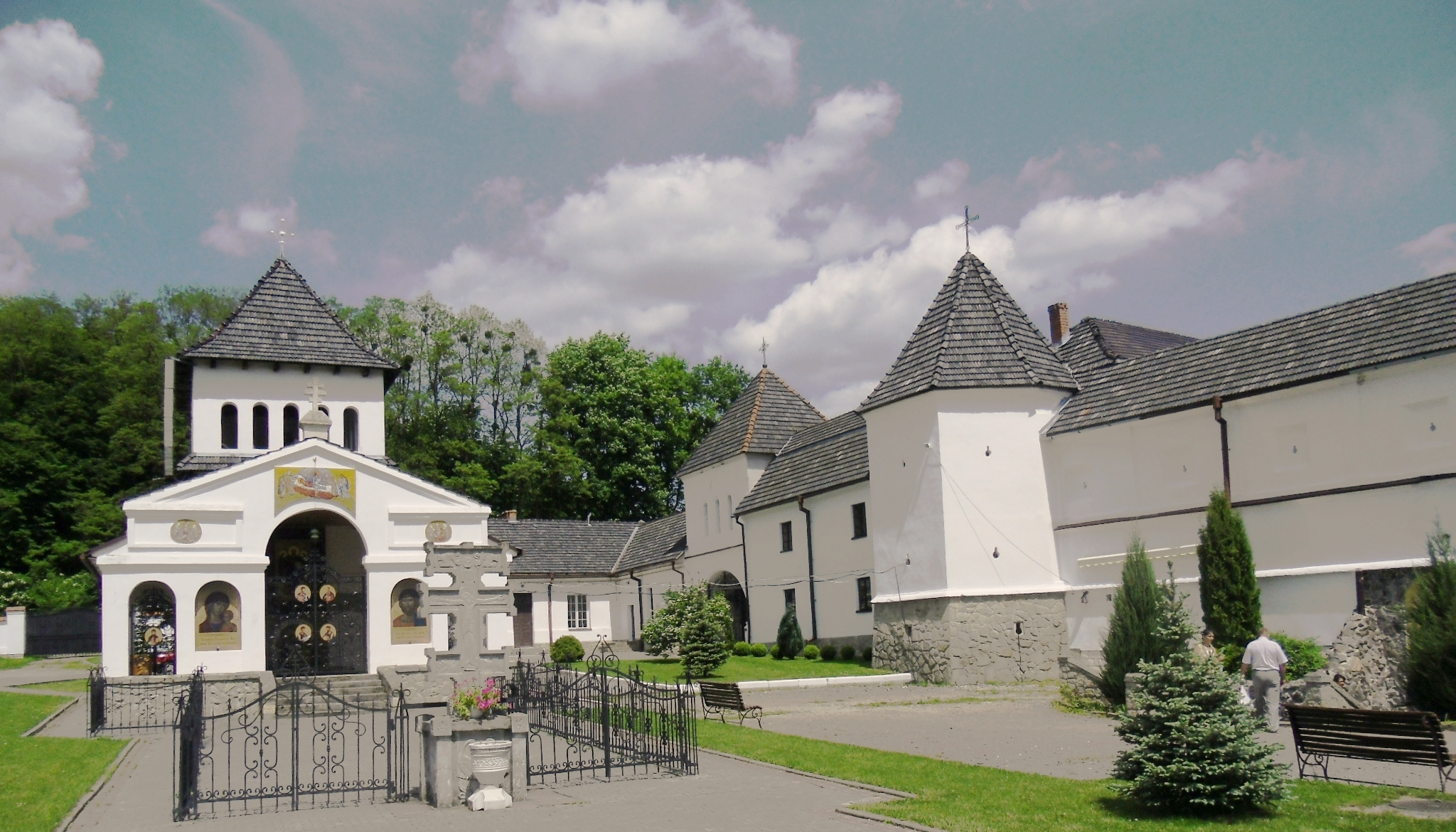
Univ Holy Dormition Lavra of the Studite Rite

Church of the martyr Clement and Leontius
