= Anytchka =

Anytchka Аничка
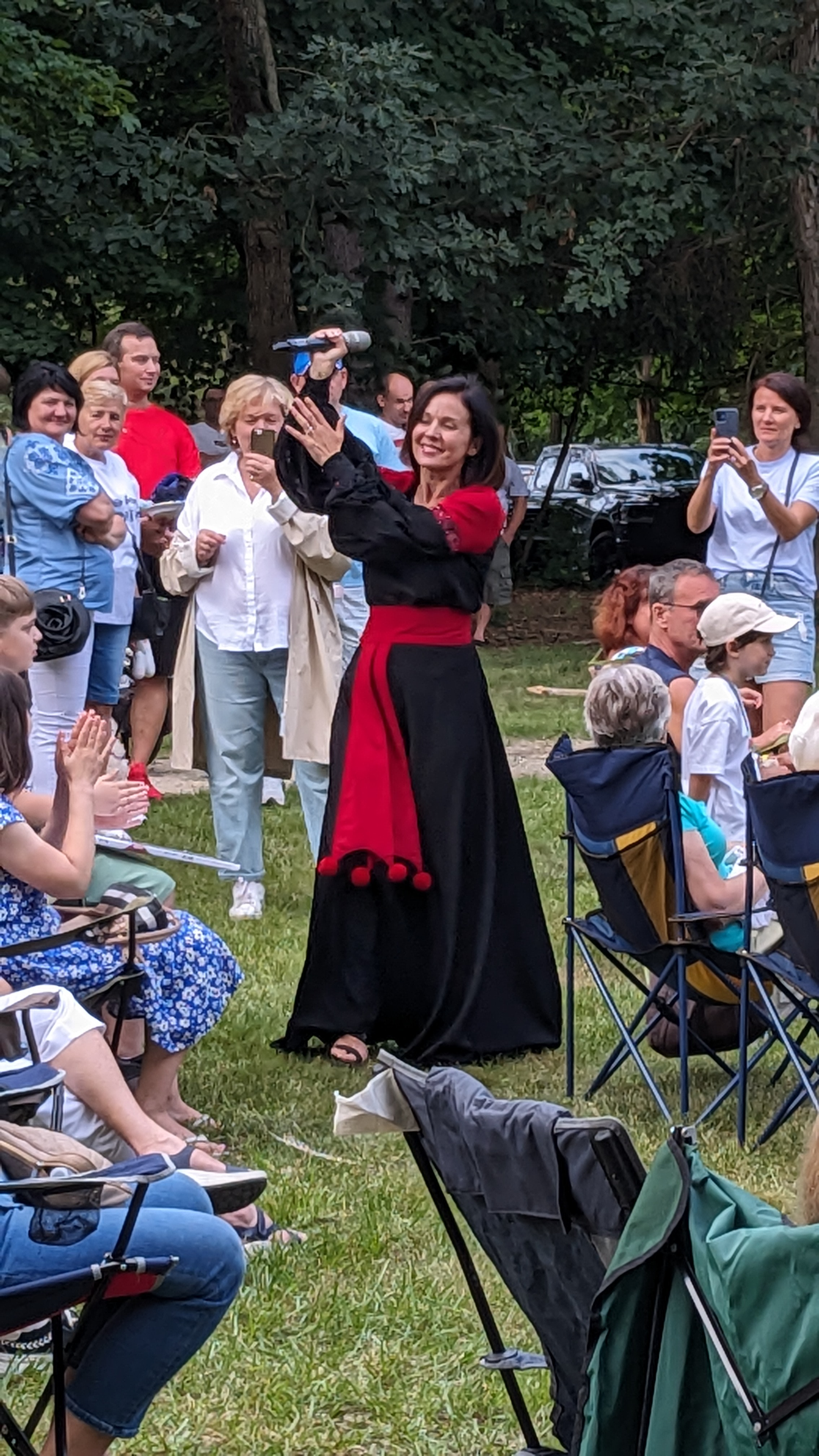
- Anytchka in 2023

Background information
- Born: Hanna Ivanivna Cheberenchyk; 19 January 1977 (age 48); Svirzh, Lviv Oblast, Ukrainian SSR, Soviet Union
- Occupation: Singer
- Years active: 1999–present

Hanna Ivanivna Cheberenchyk (Ukrainian: Ганна Іванівна Чеберенчик; born 19 January 1977), known mononymously as Anytchka (Ukrainian: Аничка), is a Ukrainian singer.

== Biography ==
Anytchka was born in the village of Svirzh, Lviv Oblast in a Lemko family. She graduated from the Lviv School of Culture and Arts (Faculty of Choral Conducting). For several years she sang in the choir "Dream", which operates at the Lviv University of Trade and Economics. Later she entered the Lviv University of Trade and Economics, Faculty of Management, graduating in 2003 with a bachelor's and master's degree in Business Administration.

Anytchka began her career on stage in July 1999 at the XVII International Festival "Łemkowska Watra" in Zdynia, Poland.

Since the Russo-Ukrainian War, Anytchka has given dozens of charity concerts and raised more than a hundred thousand dollars to rehabilitate Ukrainian defenders. Most of the funds came from the Ukrainian diaspora. The first concert took place in San Francisco, the second in Los Angeles, and the third in Sacramento. In 2017, Anytchka took part in the social and artistic project #War Songs. As part of the project, she recorded the song "There will be a time of peace" together with military pilot Serhiy Titarenko.

== Personal life ==
Anytchka lives with her husband and daughter in Sacramento, California.

== Awards and recognition ==
- Medal For Military Service to Ukraine (2016)
