= Pidvysoke, Lviv Oblast =

Village in Lviv Oblast, Ukraine

Pidvysoke Підвисоке Podwysokie
- Village
- Location within Lviv Oblast Location within Ukraine
- Coordinates: 49°39′53″N 24°27′08″E
- Country: Ukraine
- Oblast: Lviv Oblast
- Raion: Lviv Raion
- Hromada: Bibrka urban hromada
- Elevation: 368 m (1,207 ft)

Population (2001)
  - Total: 79
- Time zone: GMT+2
- Postal code: 81234
- Area code: +380 3263

Pidvysoke (Ukrainian: Підвисоке) is a village located in Lviv Raion of Lviv Oblast (region) in western Ukraine. It belongs to Bibrka urban hromada, one of the hromadas of Ukraine.

== History ==
Pidvysoke was mentioned in 1444 in the books of the Galician court.

Until 18 July 2020, Pidvysoke belonged to Peremyshliany Raion. The raion was abolished in July 2020 as part of the administrative reform of Ukraine, which reduced the number of raions of Lviv Oblast to seven. The area of Peremyshliany Raion was merged into Lviv Raion.
