= Mykola Lebed =

Ukrainian political activist, Ukrainian nationalist, and guerrilla fighter

- Микола Лебідь
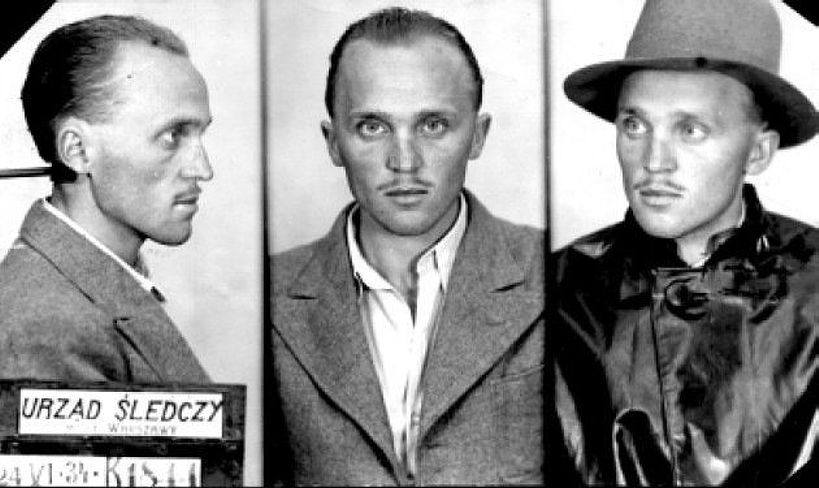
- Lebed after his arrest for his role in the murder of Bronisław Pieracki (June 24, 1934)
- Born: January 11, 1909; Novi Strilyshcha, Galicia, Austria-Hungary (now Ukraine)
- Died: July 18, 1998 (aged 89); Pittsburgh, United States
- Other names: Nikolai Lebed, Maksym Ruban, Marko, Yevhen Skyrba
- Occupations: Politician, guerrilla fighter

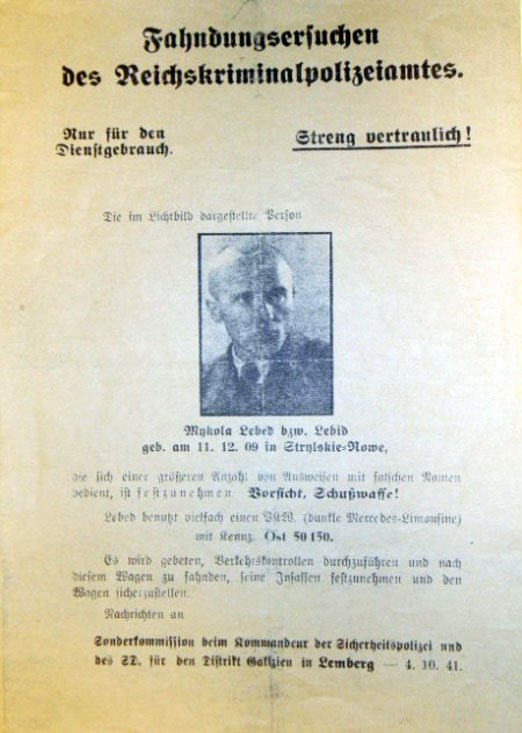
Gestapo wanted poster, 1941

Mykola Kyrylovych Lebed (Note: Ukrainian: Микола Кирилович Лебедь, romanized: Mykola Kyrylovych Lebed; Russian: Николай Кириллович Лебедь, romanized: Nikolai Kirillovich Lebed.) (January 11, 1909 – July 18, 1998, also spelled Lebid; (Note: Ukrainian: Лебідь, romanized: Lebid); also known as Maksym Ruban, Marko, or Yevhen Skyrba) was a Ukrainian nationalist political activist and guerrilla fighter. He was among those tried, convicted, and imprisoned for the killing of Polish interior minister Bronisław Pieracki in 1934. The court sentenced him to death, but the state commuted the sentence to life imprisonment. He escaped when the Germans invaded Poland in 1939. He was a leader of the faction of the Organization of Ukrainian Nationalists (OUN) led by Stepan Bandera, OUN-B, which was responsible for the massacres of Poles in Volhynia and Eastern Galicia.

From 1949, Lebed lived in the United States. The CIA worked closely with him, persuading British intelligence to support him over Bandera. He became increasingly critical of the ethno-nationalist and antisemitic ideology of the OUN. The CIA protected him from investigation for his wartime activities. He died in 1998.

== Early life ==
Born in Novi Strilyshcha, a small town in Galicia, nowadays western part of Ukraine (at the time, Austria-Hungary), Lebed completed his studies in Lviv which during the Interbellum was part of the Second Polish Republic. In 1930-32 he took an active part in setting up youth groups of Organization of Ukrainian Nationalists (OUN) in the area around Lviv. From 1932 to 1934 he directed communications between the Ukrainian Executive and the Foreign Command of the OUN.

In 1934, he participated in the preparation of the assassination of the Polish Minister of Internal Affairs Bronisław Pieracki. After the assassination he attempted to flee through Gdańsk-Szczecin to Germany, but by order of Himmler was arrested by the Gestapo and handed over to the Polish authorities. During the Warsaw Process (1934–36) he was given the death penalty which was later commuted to life imprisonment.

== World War II ==
Lebed escaped in September 1939 while being evacuated from the Bereza Kartuska Prison due to the threatening Soviet invasion.

From November 1939 through March 1940 he served as the chief of the school of espionage and sabotage founded by the Abwehr in Zakopane.

In 1940, during the internal conflict that erupted within the OUN he supported Stepan Bandera, and, in 1941, became his assistant.

In June 1941, he was minister security in the short-lived Ukrainian government established in Lwow.

In 1942, he was a participant in the 3rd Special Conference of the OUN, and headed the head council and the delegate for external contacts of the Direction of the OUN.

After the Nazi suppression of the Lwow government (Bandera was incarcerated and the Gestapo put a price on Lebed's head), Lebed assumed control of Bandera's faction of the OUN in western Ukraine, which would come to dominate the Ukrainian Insurgent Army (UPA) until 1943.

Lebed was the organizer and leader of three OUN(b) conferences in Ukraine (in September 1941, April 1942, and February 1943). According to historian Ryszard Torzecki, from 1942 to 1944 he negotiated with the Polish Home Army on a joint fight against the Nazis. Polish historian, Grzegorz Motyka in turn, notes that at the Third Great Congress, Lebed – along with Mykhailo Stepanyak – criticized the Volyn rebels for "bandit actions" against the Polish civilians.

In 1944 he became one of the founders of the Ukrainian Supreme Liberation Council (UHVR) and the general Secretary of International Policies of the UHVR. In 1944, representing the UHVR, he traveled to the West where he contacted various Western governments.

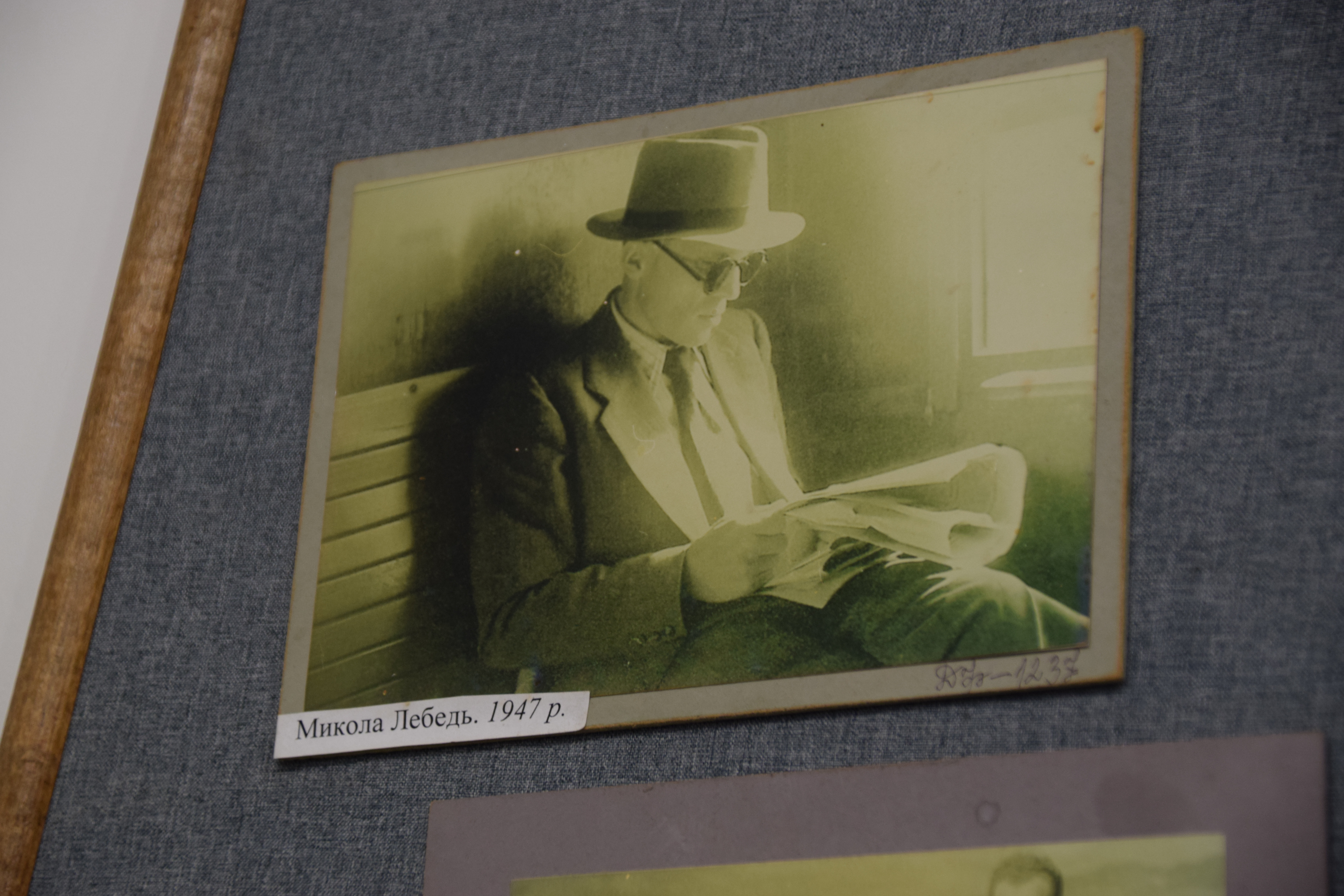
Lebed in 1947

== Postwar activities ==
In 1947, he broke with Bandera. In 1948 he was expelled from the OUN.

Although a United States Army Counterintelligence Corps report from 1947 described Lebed as a "well-known sadist and collaborator of the Germans", the Central Intelligence Agency (CIA) worked with him closely and championed him as a more stable and moderate alternative to Bandera.

In 1949 he emigrated to the US and lived in New York. Through Prolog Research Corporation, his CIA-funded organization, he gathered intelligence on the Soviet Union as late as into the late 1960s. During 1952–1974, he headed the Prolog Research Center in New York; in 1982–85, he was Deputy Chairman and from 1974 he was a Member of the Board of Directors of the institution. In 1956-91 he was a member of the board of the Ukrainian Society of Foreign Studies in Munich and Toronto, publishing committee "Chronicle of the UPA (1975). Author memories "UPA" (1946, 1987).

In 2009, the US Congress directed the National Archives and Records Administration to review declassified intelligence records pertaining to the activities of the Nazis and the Japanese Imperial Government that were not processed in time for the Nazi War Crimes and Japanese Imperial Government Records Interagency Working Group's (IWG) final report in 2007. The follow-up report from the IWG's Richard Breitman and Norman J. W. Goda included a discussion of Lebed's relationship with the CIA during the Cold War. The CIA project name for the operation was AERODYNAMIC. The report stated that as late as 1991 the CIA, for fear of compromising the operation and triggering outrage within the Ukrainian émigré community, shielded Lebed from prosecution for war crimes by preventing the US Department of Justice's Office of Special Investigations from learning about his wartime connections to the Nazis.

He died in 1998.
