= Omelyan Kovch =

Ukrainian Greek Catholic priest

Blessed Omelyan Hryhorovych Kovch

Priest and Martyr
- Born: August 20, 1884
- Died: March 25, 1944; Majdanek concentration camp
- Beatified: June 27, 2001, Lviv, Ukraine by Pope John Paul II

Omelyan Hryhorovych Kovch (Ukrainian: Омелян Григорович Ковч) (August 20, 1884, Kosmach — March 25, 1944) was a Ukrainian Greek Catholic priest murdered in Majdanek concentration camp.

He was born in a peasant family in the town of Tlumach in the Kosiv region of western Ukraine, and was ordained in 1911 by Hryhorij Chomyszyn after graduating from the Sts. Sergius and Bacchus College in Rome. In 1919, he was a field chaplain for the Ukrainian Galician Army. He served as a parish priest from 1921 to 1943 at the church of St. Nicholas in the village of Peremyshliany. Prior to his imprisonment, Fr. Kovch conducted his priestly ministry in Przemyśl while also attending to his parishioners' social and cultural life. He fathered six children and devoted himself to helping the poor and orphans.

In the spring of 1943 he was arrested by the Gestapo for harboring Jews, specifically for providing Jews with more than 600 baptismal certificates (alternative date from another source: He was arrested by the Gestapo on December 20, 1942). On March 25, 1944, he died in the infirmary of Majdanek concentration camp near Lublin, Poland.

On September 9, 1999, the Jewish Council of Ukraine awarded him the title of "Ukraine's righteous."

His beatification took place on June 27, 2001, in Lviv, during the Byzantine rite liturgy conducted by Pope John Paul II.

== Quote ==
In a letter, Fr. Kovch wrote: "I understand that you are trying to free me. But I am asking you not to do anything. Yesterday they killed 50 people here. If I were not here, who would help them to endure these sufferings? I thank God for his kindness to me. Apart from Heaven, this is the only place I'd like to be. Here we are all equal: Poles, Jews, Ukrainians, Russians, Latvians, and Estonians. I am the only priest here. I couldn't even imagine what would happen here without me. Here I see God, Who is the same for everybody, regardless of the religious distinctions which exist among us. Maybe our Churches are different, but they are ruled by the same all-powerful God. When I'm celebrating the holy Mass, everyone prays... Don't worry and don't despair about my fate. Instead of this, rejoice with me. Pray for those who created this concentration camp and this system. They are the only ones who need prayers... May God have Mercy on them.".
