= Bibrka urban hromada =

Hromada in Lviv Oblast, Ukraine

Bibrka urban hromada Бібрська міська громада
- Hromada
- Seal
- Interactive map of Bibrka urban hromada
- Country: Ukraine
- Oblast: Lviv Oblast
- Raion: Lviv Raion
- Admin. center: Bibrka

Area
  - Total: 4,354 km^{2} (1,681 sq mi)

Population (2021)
  - Total: 16,694
  - Density: 3.834/km^{2} (9.930/sq mi)
- CATOTTG code: UA46060010000049728
- Settlements: 46
- Cities: 1
- Rural settlements: 1
- Villages: 44
- Website: www.bibrka-rada.gov.ua

Bibrka urban hromada (Ukrainian: Бібрська міська громада) is a hromada in Ukraine, in Lviv Raion of Lviv Oblast. The administrative center is the city of Bibrka.

== Settlements ==
The hromada consists of 1 city (Bibrka), 1 rural settlement (Novi Strilyshcha) and 44 villages:

- Bakivtsi
- Bertyshiv
- Blahodativka
- Velyki Hlibovychi
- Vilkhovets
- Viliavche
- Volove
- Voloshchyna
- Hlibovychi
- Honchariv
- Hrabnyk
- Zadubyna
- Zakryvets
- Kvitneve
- Kniselo
- Kolohory
- Kopan
- Lany
- Liniia
- Lopushna
- Liubeshka
- Mali Lanky
- Myvseva
- Mostyshche
- Orishkivtsi
- Pidvysoke
- Pidhorodyshche
- Pidmonastyr
- Pidiarkiv
- Piatnychany
- Repekhiv
- Romaniv
- Svirzh
- Selyska
- Seniv
- Sernyky
- Sokolivka
- Stari Strilyshcha
- Stoky
- Strilky
- Sukhodil
- Trybokivtsi
- Khodorkivtsi
- Shpylchyna
