= Dobrianychi =

Dobrianychi Добряничі: Dobrjanytschi; Dobrzanica; Dobzau
- Village
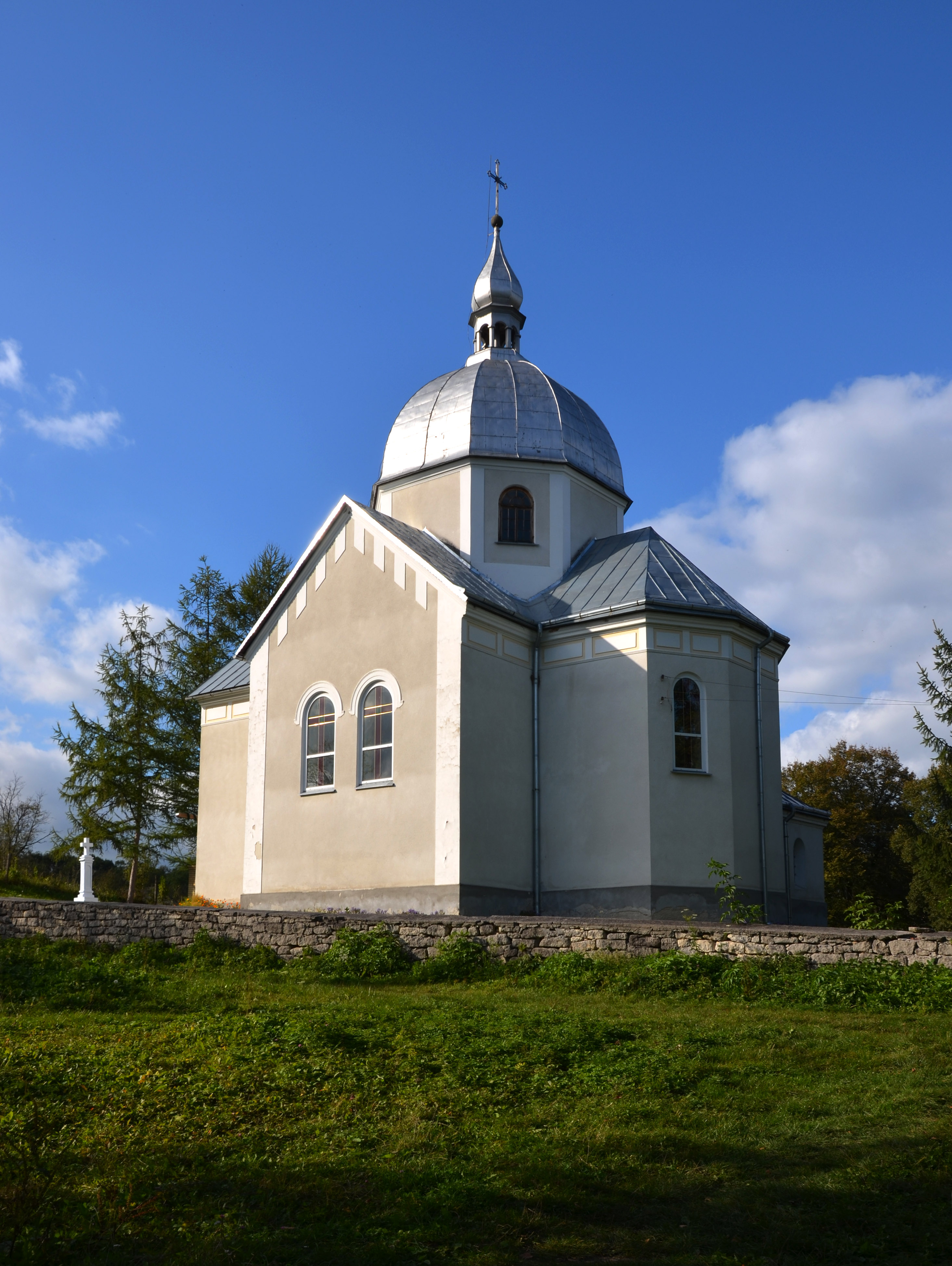
- Monument in Ukraine

- Location within Lviv Oblast Location within Ukraine
- Coordinates: 49°33′44″N 24°31′27″E
- Country: Ukraine
- Oblast: Lviv Oblast
- Raion: Peremyshliany

Government
  - Mayor: Senovyj Mychajlovytsch

Population (2004)
  - Total: 379
  - Density: 236.88/km^{2} (613.5/sq mi)
- Time zone: UTC+2 (EET)
  - Summer (DST): UTC+3 (EEST)
- Postal code: 81252
- Area code: +380 3263
- Website: gska2.rada.gov.ua

Dobrianychi, also written as Dobryanichi or Dobrjanici (Ukrainian: Добряничі; German: Dobzau, Polish: Dobrzanica), is a village in Lviv Oblast near the town of Peremyshliany in Ukraine. Dobrianychi is formed from the village of Dobrianychi and the villages of Ploska (Плоска) and Tutschne (Тучне).

== Famous natives ==
- Wilhelm Reich (1897–1957), psychoanalyst
