= Bibrka =

City in Lviv Oblast, Ukraine

Bibrka Бібрка Bóbrka
- City
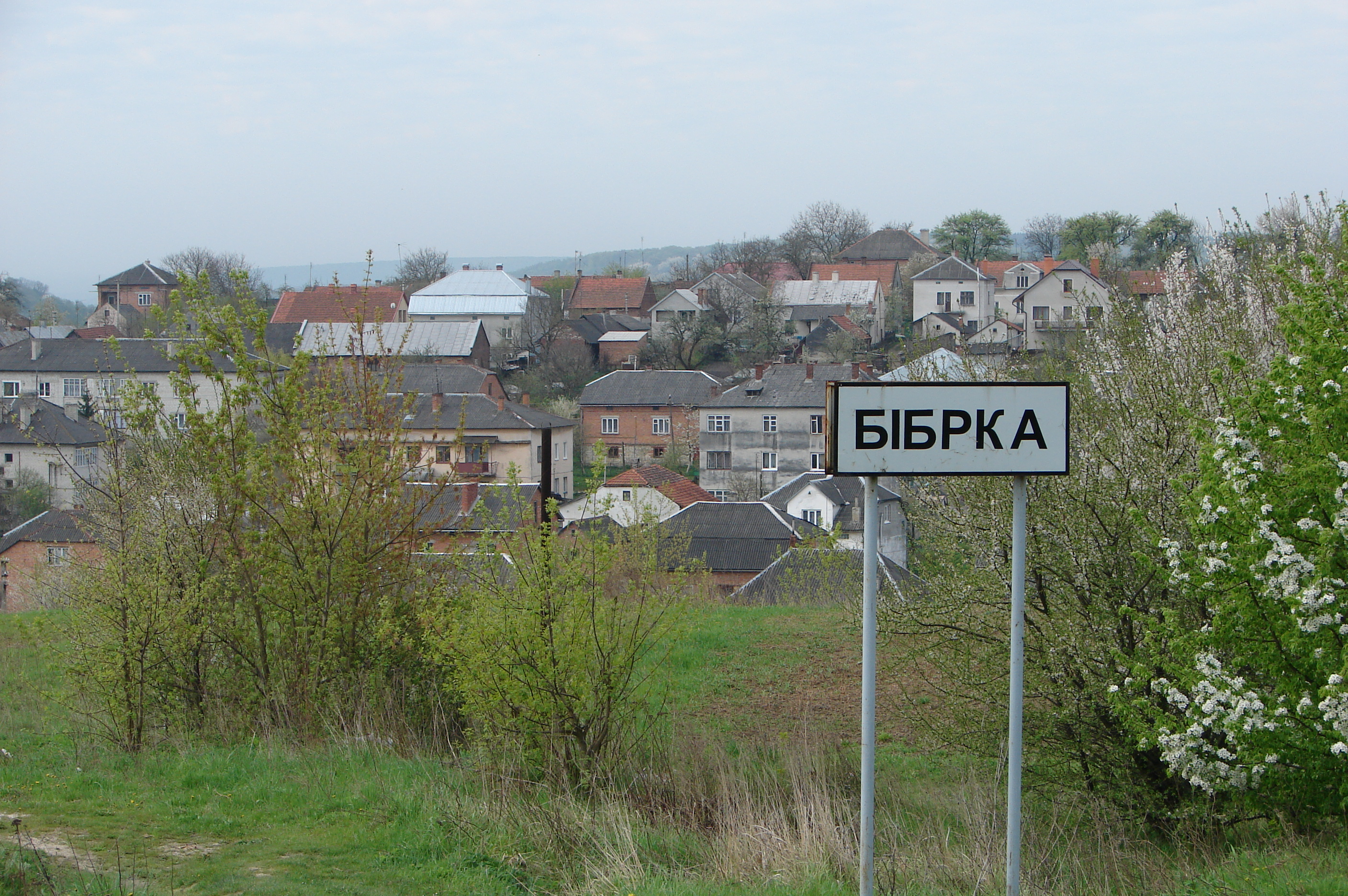
- Skyline of Bibrka

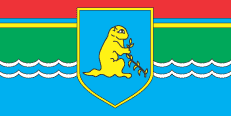
- Flag Coat of arms

- Location within Ukraine Location within Lviv Oblast
- Country: Ukraine
- Oblast: Lviv Oblast
- Raion: Lviv Raion
- Hromada: Bibrka urban hromada

Population (2022)
  - Total: 3,761
- Time zone: GMT+2

Bibrka (Ukrainian: Бібрка, IPA: [ˈbibrkɐ]; Polish: Bóbrka; Yiddish: בוברקא, romanized: Bubrka) is a city in western Ukraine, located in Lviv Raion of Lviv Oblast (region) about 29 km southeast of Lviv on H09. It hosts the administration of Bibrka urban hromada, one of the hromadas of Ukraine. The population is approximately 3,761 (2022 estimate).

The town has been ruled at various points by the Kingdom of Poland, Polish–Lithuanian Commonwealth, the Austrian Empire, the Kingdom of Galicia and Lodomeria, the Russian Empire, Poland, the Soviet Union, and is now part of the Lviv Oblast in Ukraine; as a result Bibrka has had several official and native names, including: Bóbrka (Polish), Bobrka (Russian), Prachnik (German), and Boiberik/Boyberke (Yiddish). The city has a population of 3,980.

Bibrka was the site of a Soviet prison and detention centre that detained Poles and others in the mid-20th century.

== History ==
The city was first mentioned in the 1211 Galician-Volhynian Chronicle, along with the neighboring villages of Stara Biborka and Nova Biborka. The Biborka River is also mentioned, as well as the ancient tract of Boberka (Biborka), which means a place where beavers were hunted in ancient Rus. However, other sources claim that it was only the Biborka River and not the city of Biborka itself which was mentioned in 1211, and that the settlement itself was first mentioned in a 1436 chronicle as the possession of Vnuchek from Kutno. The settlement was owned by the Polish king and was part of the Grand Duchy of Lithuania. Local craftsmen – tanners, weavers, shoemakers, and merchants – paid taxes to the Lviv starosta as the king's representative. Biborka was often leased to feudal lords.

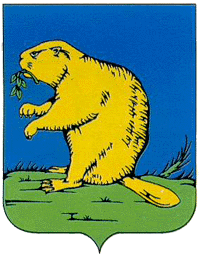
Coat of arms of Biborka in 1569

From 1353 to 1366, Dmytro Koryatovych of the Koryatovych dynasty, known in Russian chronicles as the voivode of Bobrok-Volynskyi, owned land on the banks of the river Biborka. These lands were dependent on the Grand Duke of Lithuania Liubartas, whom Dmytro Koryatovych served as a vassal. It is possible that he founded the Bobrok Castle on these lands, which later gave rise to the town of Biborka. Dmytro was married to Anna, the sister of the Grand Prince of Moscow, Dmitry Donskoy. It was after this marriage that the symbol of St. George the Dragon Slayer became the emblem of the Moscow princes and Moscow itself. The Volynian branch of the Russian princes descended from Dmytro Koryatovych.

Volodymyr Kormylchych is also considered a possible founder of the city. In 1469, Biborka received Magdeburg rights by the privilege of Casimir IV Jagiellon, which allowed for two annual fairs and weekly markets every Tuesday. The privilege was confirmed by Sigismund II Augustus in 1569, who allowed for a third annual fair and markets not only on Tuesdays, but also on Saturdays. Townspeople were also allowed to brew beer for their own consumption.

In 1474, a great fire destroyed almost the entire city of Biborka. As a result, the government exempted Biborka from taxes for 10 years.

In 1502, Turkish-Tatar hordes completely destroyed the city. In the tax registry of 1515, a mill was documented in the city, along with a priest, indicating that there was already a church at the time.

On October 10, 1518, the city was exempted from paying taxes for 6 years due to its destruction during the Tatar invasion.

On January 13, 1530, the city, along with the villages of Serniki, Lany, and Piatnychany, was transferred to the lifelong possession of Peter Venglivsky's widow, Anna Venglivska, after his death.

From 1605 to 1633, the Lviv district, to which Biborka belonged, was devastated by Tatar invasions 14 times in 28 years, including in 1612–1624 and 1626. Biborka could not recover from this devastation for a long time: in the 1621 inventory, royal foragers could not find any provisions in the city. In 1638, the Polish Sejm recognized that Biborka had almost completely declined and again exempted its residents from paying taxes for 4 years.

On April 28, 1643, King Władysław IV Vasa granted the right of "life tenure" to half of the city of Biborka and the villages of Lany, Lanky, and Piatnychany to Lviv stolnik Stanisław Kowalski. On June 20, 1643, he extended this right to his wife, Regina Tshyebenska.

When the Cossack troops entered Biborka in 1648, the local shoemakers' guild gave them 80 pairs of boots, and the local furriers gave them 60 fur coats.

The Polish-Swedish War (1655–1660) brought the city to complete decline. According to the 1661 inventory, there were only 26 houses in the city, compared to 150 before the war. Only in 1765 did the number of houses reach 300. In addition, Biborka had many people who did not have their own homes, known as halupnyky.

From the first partition of Poland in 1772 until 1918, the town was part of the Austrian monarchy, and part of the Austrian side of Austria-Hungary after the compromise of 1867. It was the seat of the Bobrka district, one of the 78 Bezirkshauptmannschaften of the province (crown land) of Austrian Galicia in 1900. The fate of this province was then disputed between Poland and Russia until the Peace of Riga in 1921.

In 1774, the Lviv starosta Milbacher wrote that there was no teacher in the Bibrka district.

In 1790, the city was acquired by Count Skarbek, a famous magnate. In the 1790s, the first educational institutions were opened: two-year (trivial) and three-year (normal) schools. In the 1840s, Bibrka had a population of 3,000 people. There was a textile factory.

In Bibrka, there was an estate that belonged to the Chaykovsky family, in particular to Jan Chaykovsky, a Lviv lawyer.

In the city, the remains of two synagogues have been preserved. One, called the Great Synagogue, was built in 1821. It is located in the central part of the city, to the north of the market square. The Great Synagogue is now almost ruined. To the north of the market square and to the east of the Great Synagogue is the prayer house, which was built in the mid-19th century. To the west of the city center, near the bridge, there was an 18th-century cemetery with about 20 matzevot remaining. There were two synagogues in Bibrka in 1851.

On 3 March 1918, a "celebration of statehood and peace" veche was held in the city in support of the actions of the government of the Ukrainian People's Republic. About 20,000 people attended.

In the middle of 1941, approximately 2,000 Jews lived in Bibrka. The Germans commenced their occupation of the town during World War II on June 30, 1941. In 1942, the Germans created a ghetto for the remaining 1,500 – 1,900 Jews who had not been deported to the Bełzec extermination camp. Approximately 300 Jews died in the ghetto due to disease and illness. The ghetto was liquidated on April 13, 1943, during which over 1,300 Jews were killed on a site in the nearby village of Volove.

The region was annexed by the Soviet Union in 1945.

Until 18 July 2020, Bibrka belonged to Peremyshliany Raion. The raion was abolished in July 2020 as part of the administrative reform of Ukraine, which reduced the number of raions of Lviv Oblast to seven. The area of Peremyshliany Raion was merged into Lviv Raion.

== Demographics ==
As of the Ukrainian census in 2001, the town had a population 3,949 inhabitants. The ethnic and linguistic composition was as follows:

Ethnic groups in Bibrka
	percent
Ukrainians	97.90%
Poles	1.01%
Russians	0.81%
others	0.28%

Native languages in Bibrka
	percent
Ukrainian	99.1%
Russian	0.6%
Polish	0.2%
others	0.1%

== Gallery ==
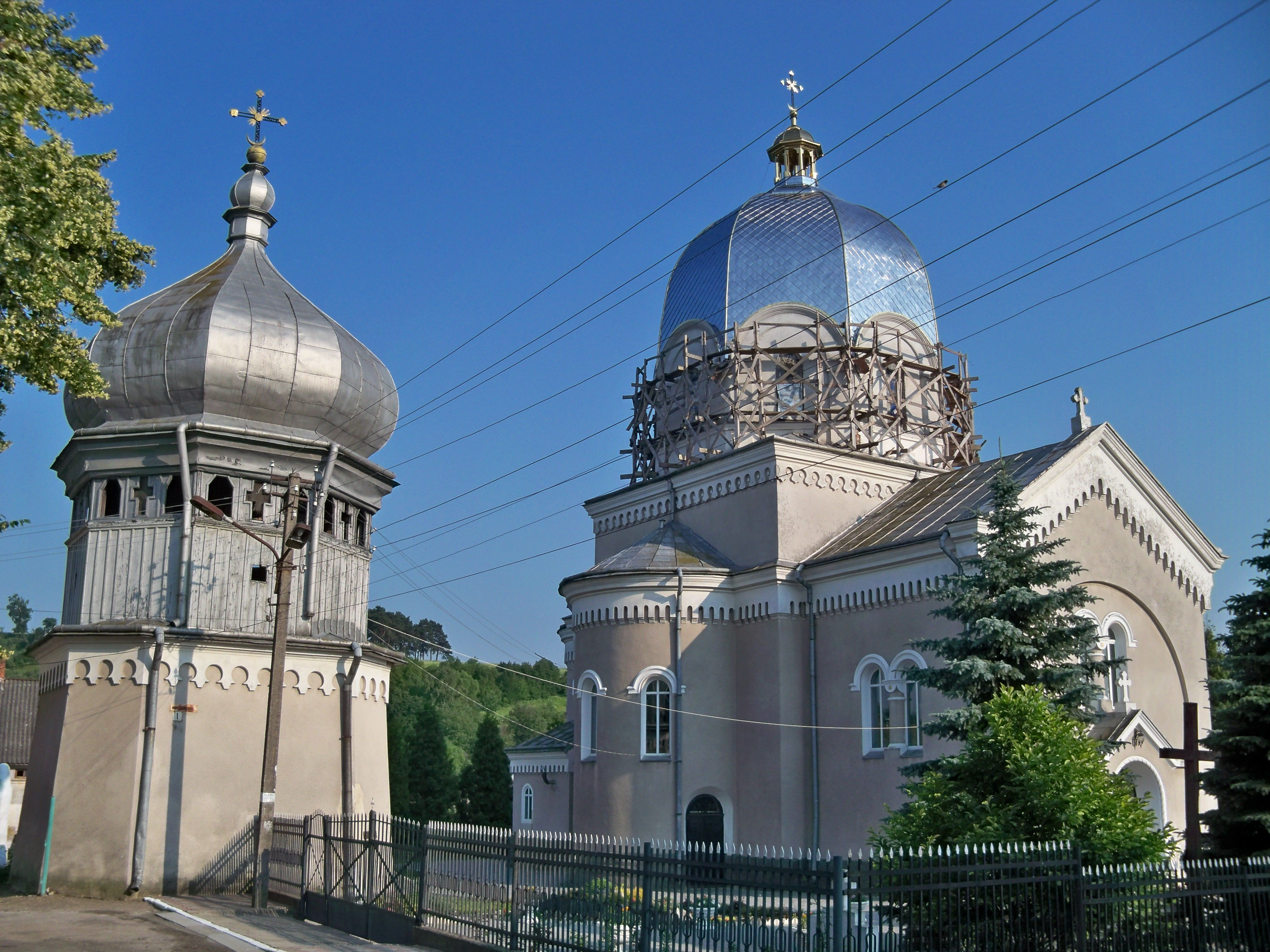
Epiphany Church in Bibrka

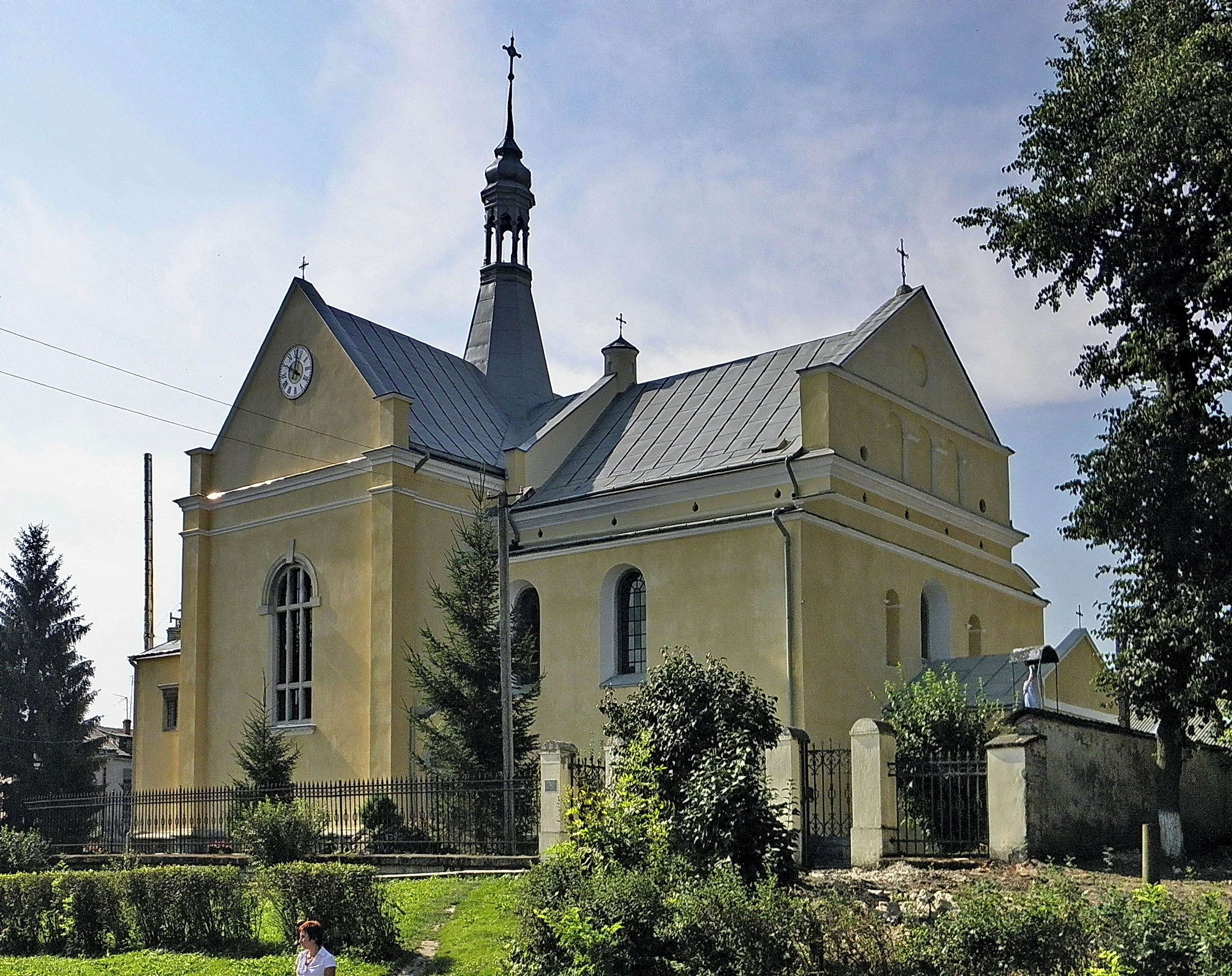
St. Nicholas Church

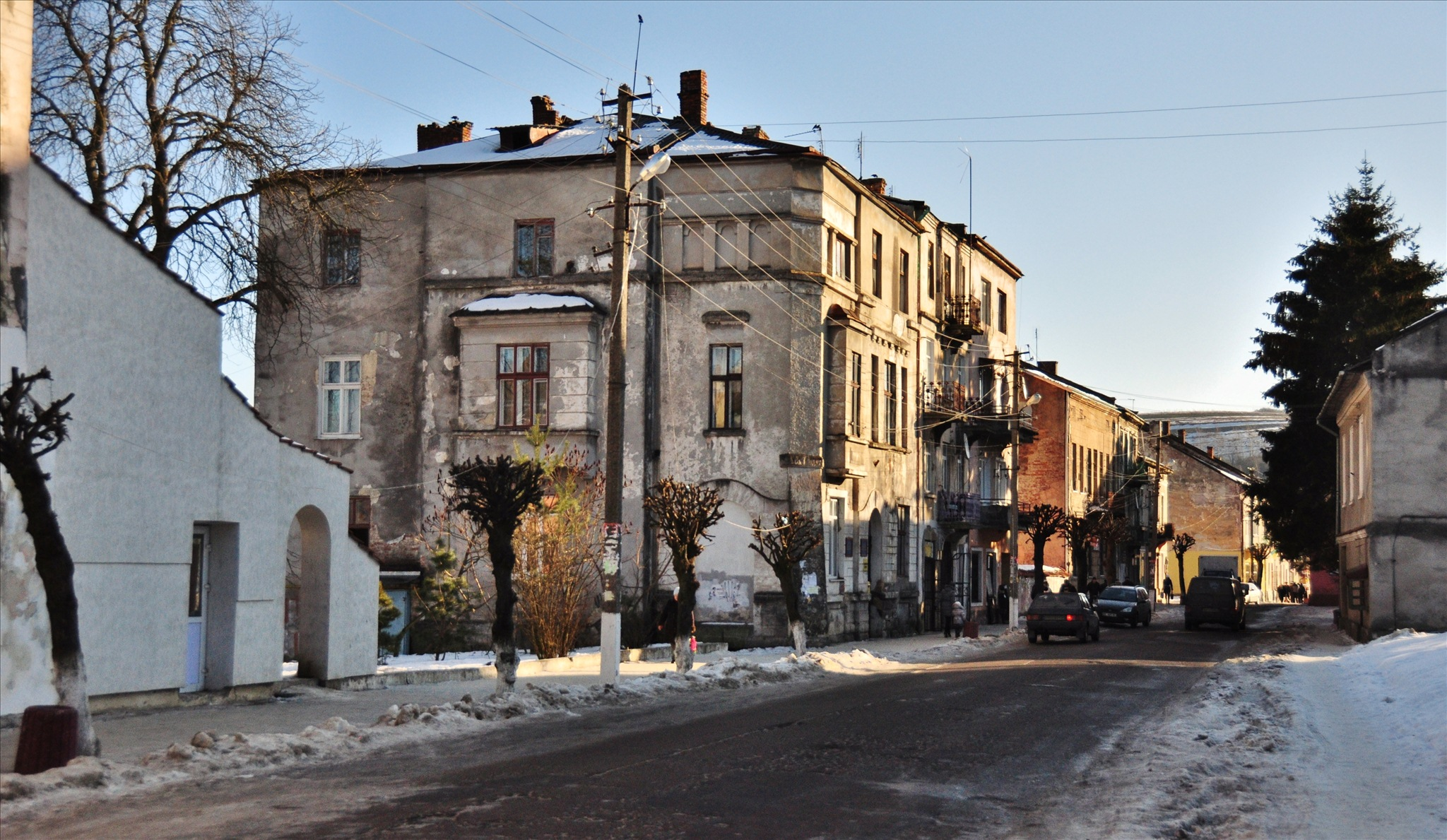
A street in Bibrka

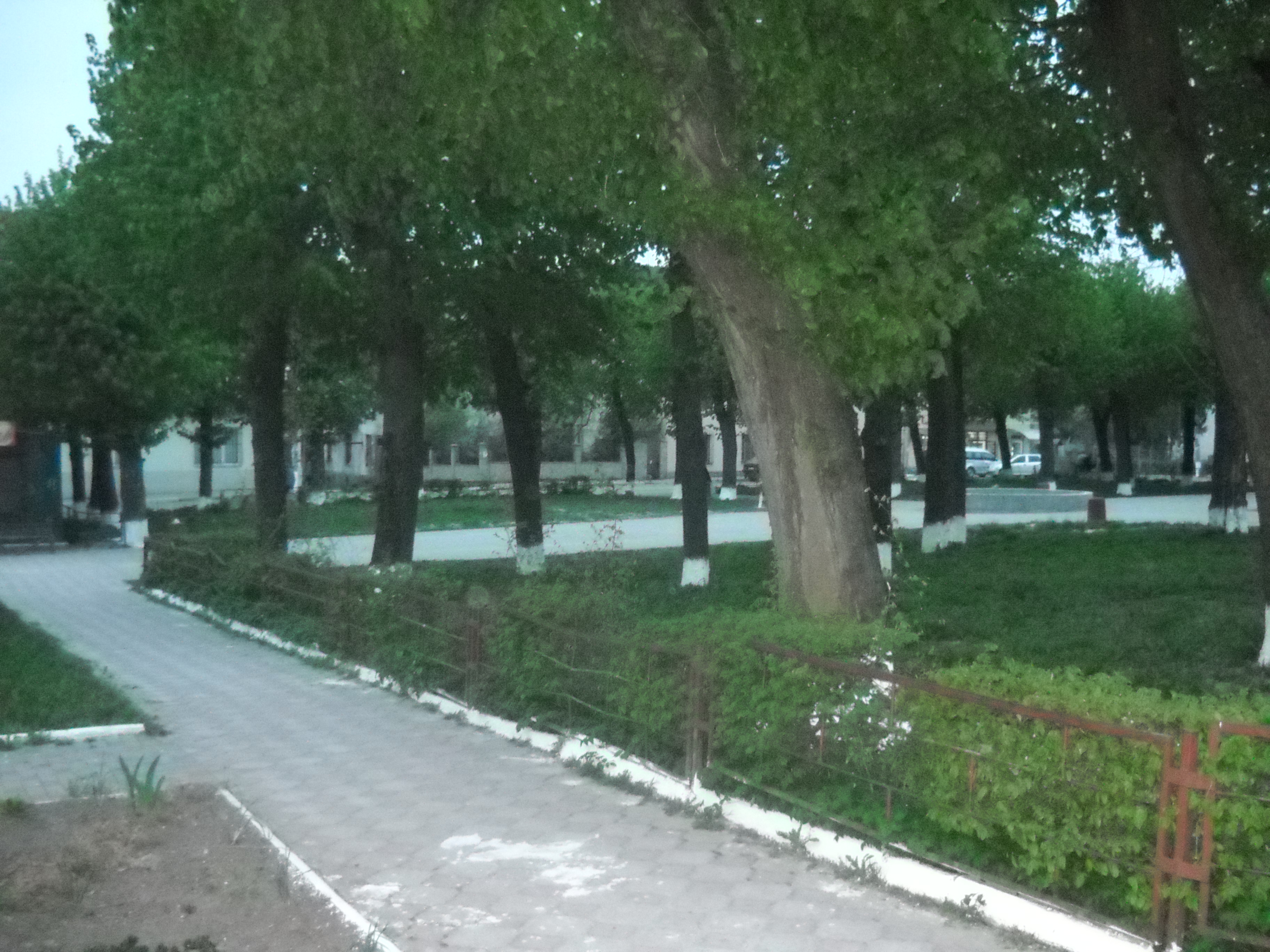
City park
