= Peremyshliany urban hromada =

Hromada in Lviv Oblast, Ukraine

Peremyshliany urban hromada Перемишлянська міська громада
- Hromada
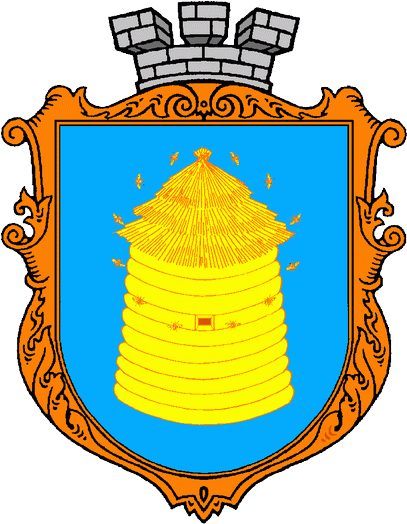
- Seal
- Interactive map of Peremyshliany urban hromada
- Country: Ukraine
- Oblast: Lviv Oblast
- Raion: Lviv Raion
- Admin. center: Peremyshliany

Area
  - Total: 584 km^{2} (225 sq mi)

Population (2021)
  - Total: 23,787
  - Density: 40.7/km^{2} (105/sq mi)
- CATOTTG code: UA46060330000065074
- Settlements: 59
- Cities: 1
- Villages: 58
- Website: rada-peremyshlyany.gov.ua

Peremyshliany urban hromada (Ukrainian: Перемишлянська міська громада) is a hromada in Ukraine, in Lviv Raion of Lviv Oblast. The administrative center is the city of Peremyshliany.

== Settlements ==
The hromada consists of 1 city (Peremyshliany) and 58 villages:

- Bachiv
- Bile
- Bilka
- Bolotnia
- Borshiv
- Brykun
- Briukhovychi
- Vypysky
- Vyshnivchyk
- Vovkiv
- Hanachivka
- Huralnia
- Dobrianychi
- Dunaiv
- Dusaniv
- Zastavky-Yabluniv
- Zatemne
- Ivanivka
- Kaminna
- Kymyr
- Korelychi
- Korosno
- Kosteniv
- Kuzubatytsia
- Kurnyi
- Kucherivka
- Lahodiv
- Ladantsi
- Lypivtsi
- Loni
- Lonivka
- Malyi Poliukhiv
- Mereshchiv
- Nedilyska
- Novosilky
- Ostalovychi
- Pidsmereky
- Plenykiv
- Pletenychi
- Ploska
- Pniatyn
- Podusiv
- Podusilna
- Prybyn
- Rivna
- Rozsokhy
- Rubche
- Syvorohy
- Smerekivka
- Stanymyr
- Ternivka
- Tuchne
- Univ
- Utikhovychi
- Ushkovychi
- Khomyna
- Chemeryntsi
- Chupernosiv
