= Svirzh, Sumy Oblast =

Village in Sumy Oblast, Ukraine

Svirzh Свірж
- Village
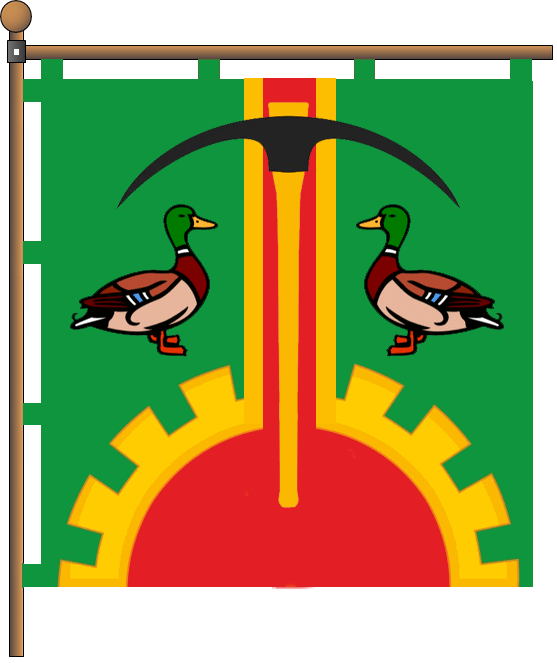

- Location within Sumy Oblast Location within Ukraine
- Coordinates: 52°00′32″N 33°24′36″E
- Country: Ukraine
- Oblast: Sumy Oblast
- Raion: Shostka Raion
- Hromada: Shostka urban hromada
- Elevation: 135 m (443 ft)

Population (2001)
  - Total: 149
- Time zone: GMT+2
- Postal code: 41115
- Area code: +380 5449

Svirzh (Ukrainian: Свірж) is a village located in Shostka Raion of Sumy Oblast (region) in northeastern Ukraine. It belongs to Shostka urban hromada, one of the hromadas of Ukraine.

== Geography ==
The village of Svirzh is located on the bank of the river Svirzh, near its source, and the village of Pohrebky is located 1.5 km (0.93 mi) downstream.

== Demographics ==
According to the 1989 census, the population of Svirzh was 207 people, of whom 77 were men and 130 were women. According to the 2001 census, 149 people lived in the village.

Native language as of the Ukrainian Census of 2001:

Language	Percentage
Ukrainian	80.13 %
Russian	19.87 %
