= Svirzh Castle =

Coordinates: 49°39′09″N 24°25′55″E

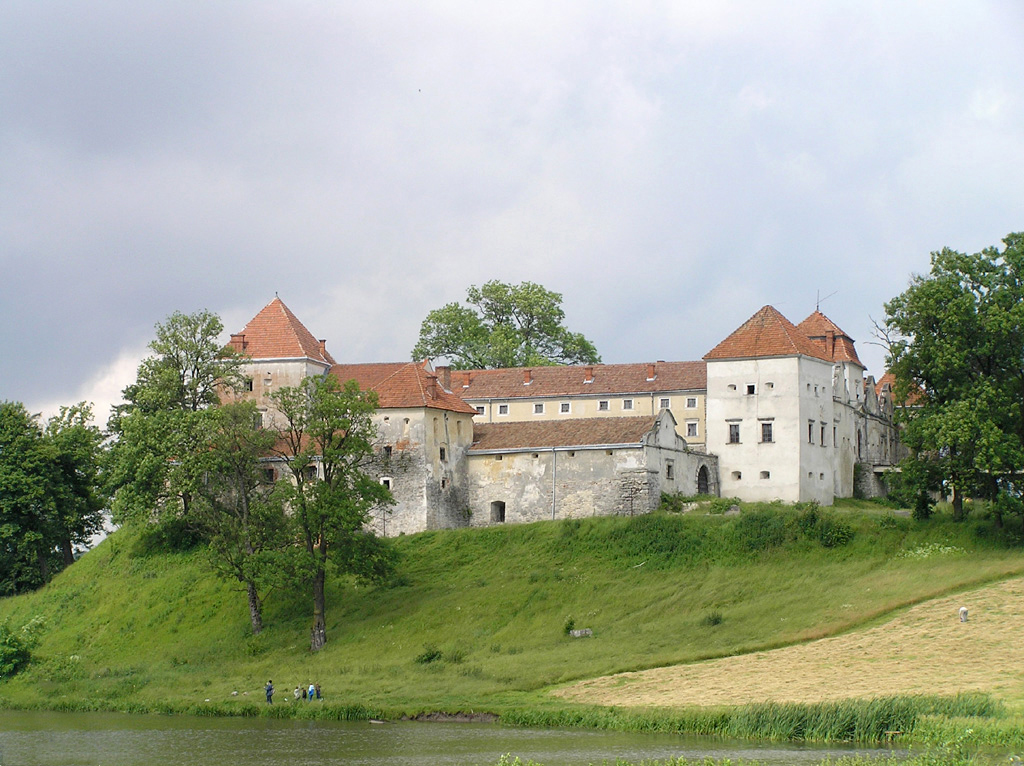
Svirzh Castle was heavily restored in 1975–83.

The Svirz Castle (Ukrainian: Свірзький замок, romanized: Svirz'kyi zamok; Polish: Zamek w Świrzu) is a fortified aristocratic residence in Svirzh, Lviv Oblast, Ukraine. It was originally built by the Świrski noble family in the 15th century. Inside the castle is a small church dating from 1546.

The stronghold was completely rebuilt in the 17th century at the behest of its new owner, Count Aleksander Cetner. It is believed that General Paweł Grodzicki was responsible for the modernisation of the castle's fortifications.

Though surrounded on all sides by moats, lakes, and marshes, the fort was taken by the rebellious Cossacks on several occasions. In 1648, the Turks set it on fire; they were less successful during the Lwow raid of 1672.

The castle stood in ruins for many years. It was restored in 1907, only to be devastated by fire in 1914. Rebuilding and restoration have occurred on several occasions since.
