= Peremyshliany =

City in Lviv Oblast, Ukraine

Peremyshliany Перемишляни Przemyślany
- City
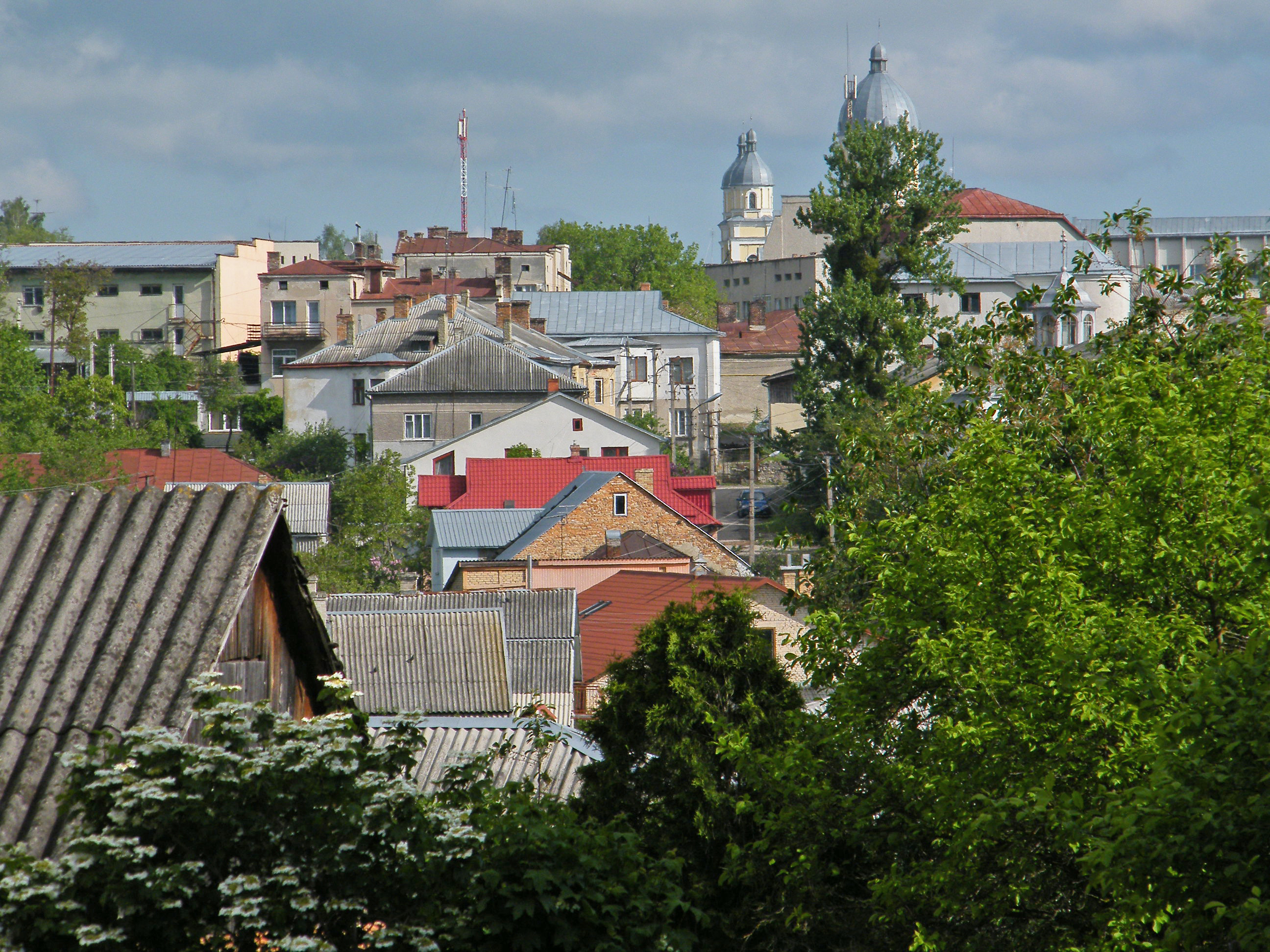
- Skyline of Peremyshliany

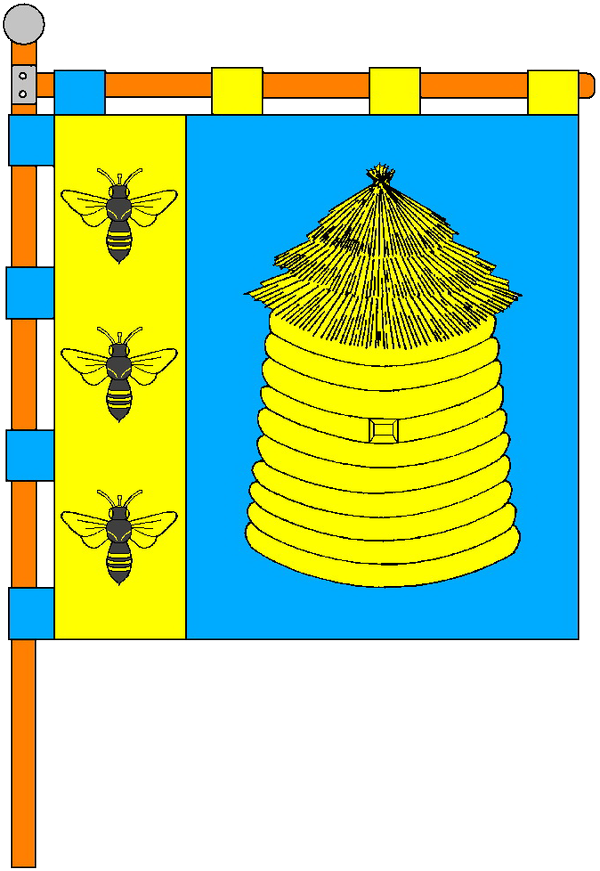
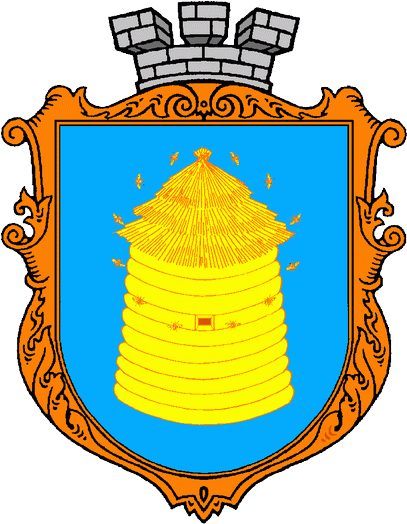
- Flag Coat of arms

- Location within Lviv Oblast Location within Ukraine
- Coordinates: 49°40′12″N 24°33′34″E
- Country: Ukraine
- Oblast: Lviv Oblast
- Raion: Lviv Raion
- Hromada: Peremyshliany urban hromada
- First mentioned: 1437
- Magdeburg rights: 1623

Population (2022)
  - Total: 6,415
- Time zone: UTC+2 (EET)
  - Summer (DST): UTC+3 (EEST)

Peremyshliany (Ukrainian: Перемишляни, IPA: [peremɪˈʃlʲɑnɪ]; Polish: Przemyślany; Yiddish: פּרעמישליאַן, Premishlan) is a small city in Lviv Raion, Lviv Oblast (region) of Ukraine. It hosts the administration of Peremyshliany urban hromada, one of the hromadas of Ukraine. Population: 6,415 (2022 estimate).

Przemyślany, as the town is called in Polish, was first mentioned as a village in 1437. Until the Partitions of Poland (1772), it was part of Poland's Ruthenian Voivodeship. In 1623, Przemyslany received Magdeburg rights. In 1772-1918, it belonged to Austrian Galicia, and in 1919, it returned to Poland. In the Second Polish Republic, it was the seat of a county in Tarnopol Voivodeship. The town had a Jewish population of 2,934 in 1900. Most of them were murdered in the Holocaust.

Since 1909, the Lviv-Pidhaitsi railroad has been running through the town, which facilitated the development of trade and logging and gave impetus to the growth of the town's economy, and the development of forestry and trade began. During the First World War, two fierce Austro-Russian battles took place near Przemyślany (August 29–30, 1914 and June 29-July 2, 1915).

After the First World War, Przemyślany became part of Poland. During August–September 1920, the city was occupied by the Red Army, but after the defeat of the Red cavalry near Warsaw, 1918-1939 marked the city's re-affiliation with Poland. In 1931, the city was inhabited by 67% Poles, 20% Jews, 13% Ukrainians, and others.

Poland retained these lands until 1939. Then came the Second World War. In September 1939, the Soviets came to the city again. Soviet rule is established in the city. On 10.02. and 13.04. 1941, almost 90 people, mostly Poles, were deported from Przemyślany to Siberia.

The German occupation began on July 1, 1941, when the first German soldiers entered Przemyślany. On July 4 (according to other sources, 15.07-www.jewishgen.org), in the afternoon, the main local synagogue was burned down, where an unknown number of Jews were kept.

On May 22, 1943, the Nazis killed the Jewish population in Przemyślany. On June 18, 1944, the Nazi troops were driven out by the Soviet 16th Brigade of Colonel Vsevolod Ryvzh.

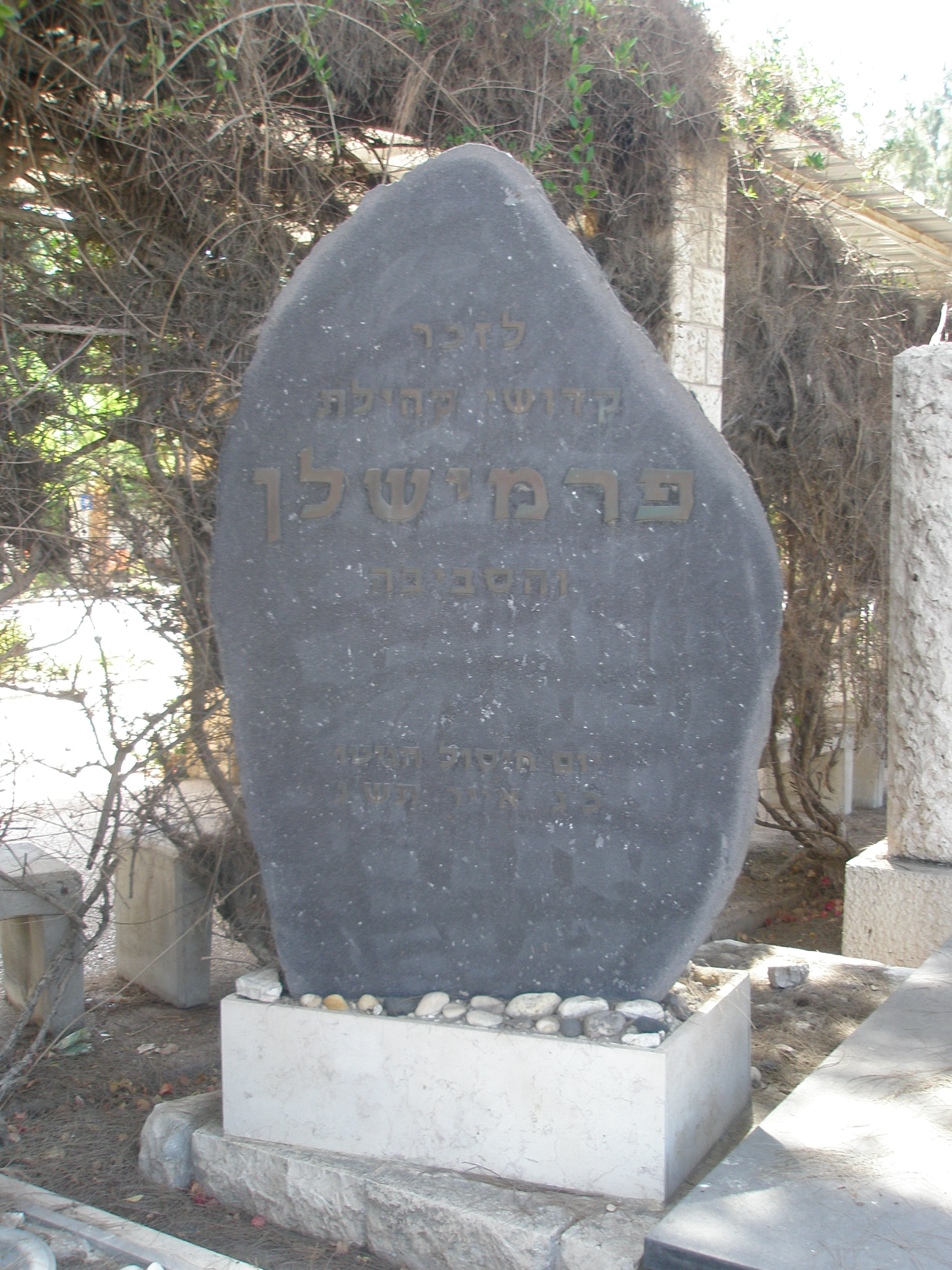
Peremyshliany holocaust memorial in Kiryat Shaul cemetery in Tel Aviv

Until 18 July 2020, Peremyshliany was the administrative center of Peremyshliany Raion. The raion was abolished in July 2020, as part of the administrative reform of Ukraine, which reduced the number of raions of Lviv Oblast to seven. The area of Peremyshliany Raion was merged into Lviv Raion.

== Notable people ==
- Naftule Brandwein, klezmer musician
- Wojciech Filarski (1831–1898), Polish philosopher, rector of the Lwow University
- bl. Omelian Kovch (1884–1944), Ukrainian priest and martyr murdered at the Majdanek death camp.
- Wilhelm Reich (1897–1957), psychoanalyst and natural scientist was born in the village of Dobrzanica (now Dobryanichi), in the Peremyshliany district
- Adam Daniel Rotfeld (born 1938), Polish diplomat and Foreign Minister
- Baruch Steinberg (1897-1940), Rabbi killed in Katyn Massacre
- Vilunya Diskin (b. 1941), Holocaust survivor, founding member and author of Our Bodies, Ourselves

== Gallery ==
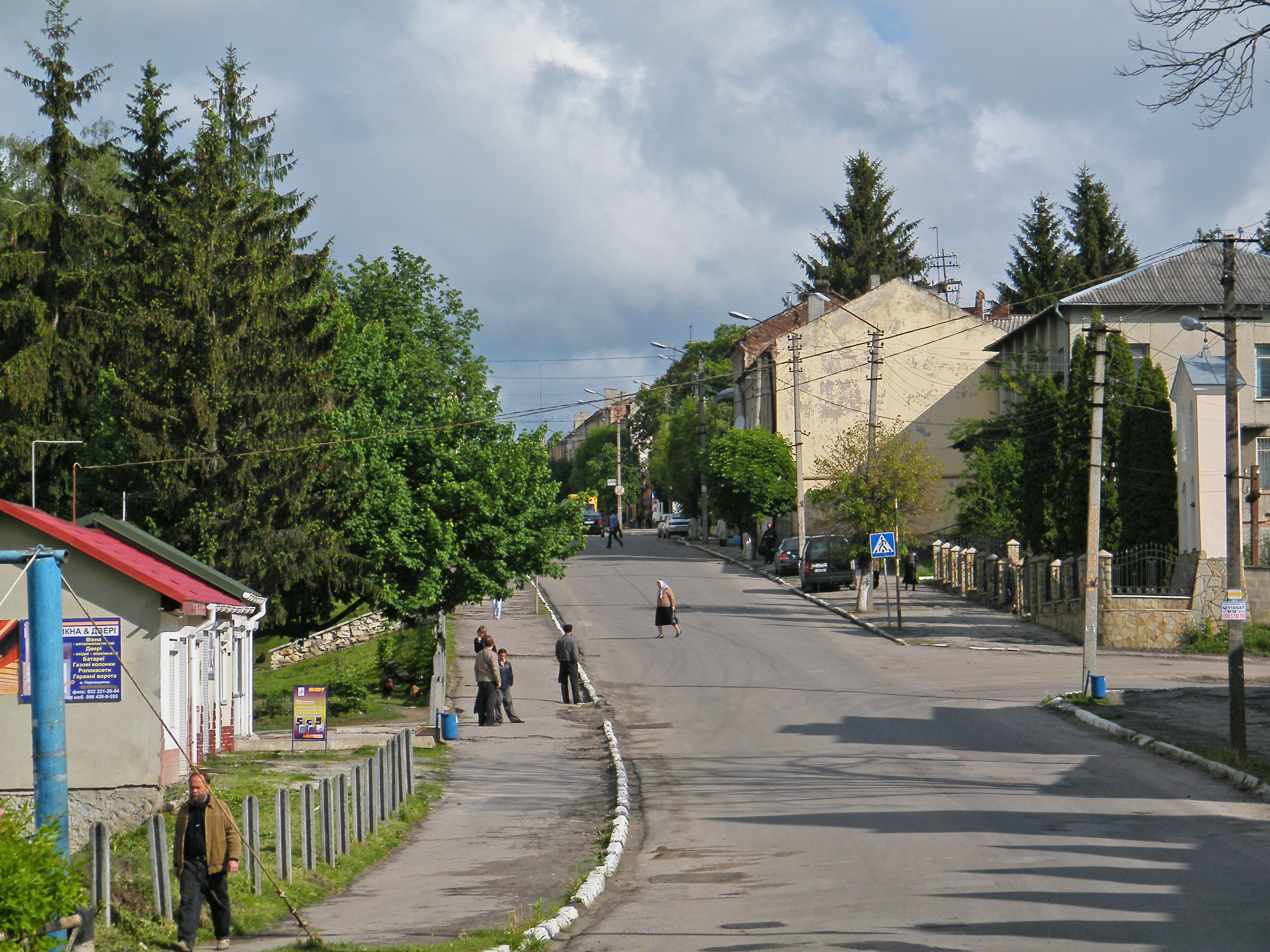
Main street of Peremyshliany

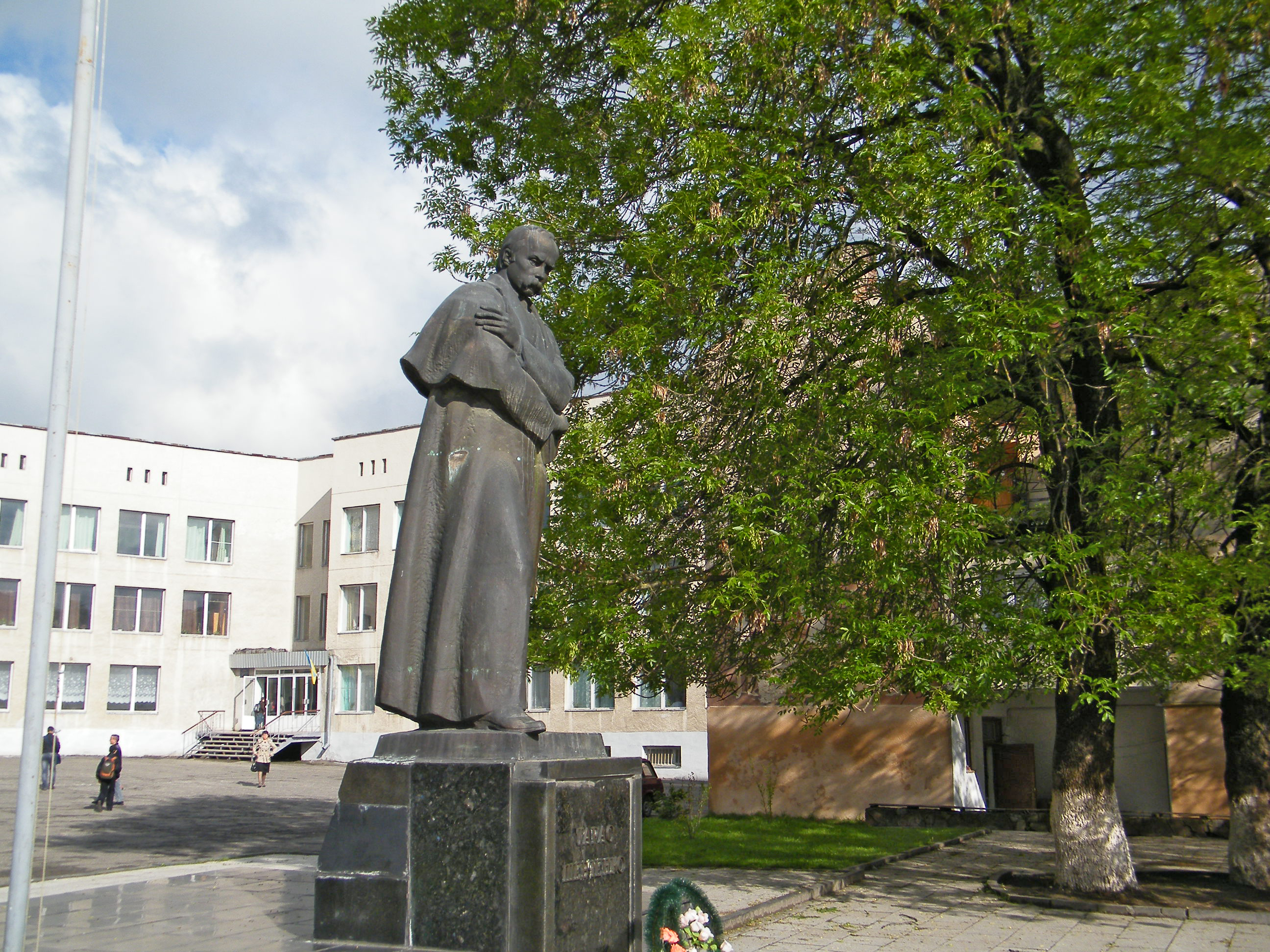
Local school and Taras Shevchenko monument

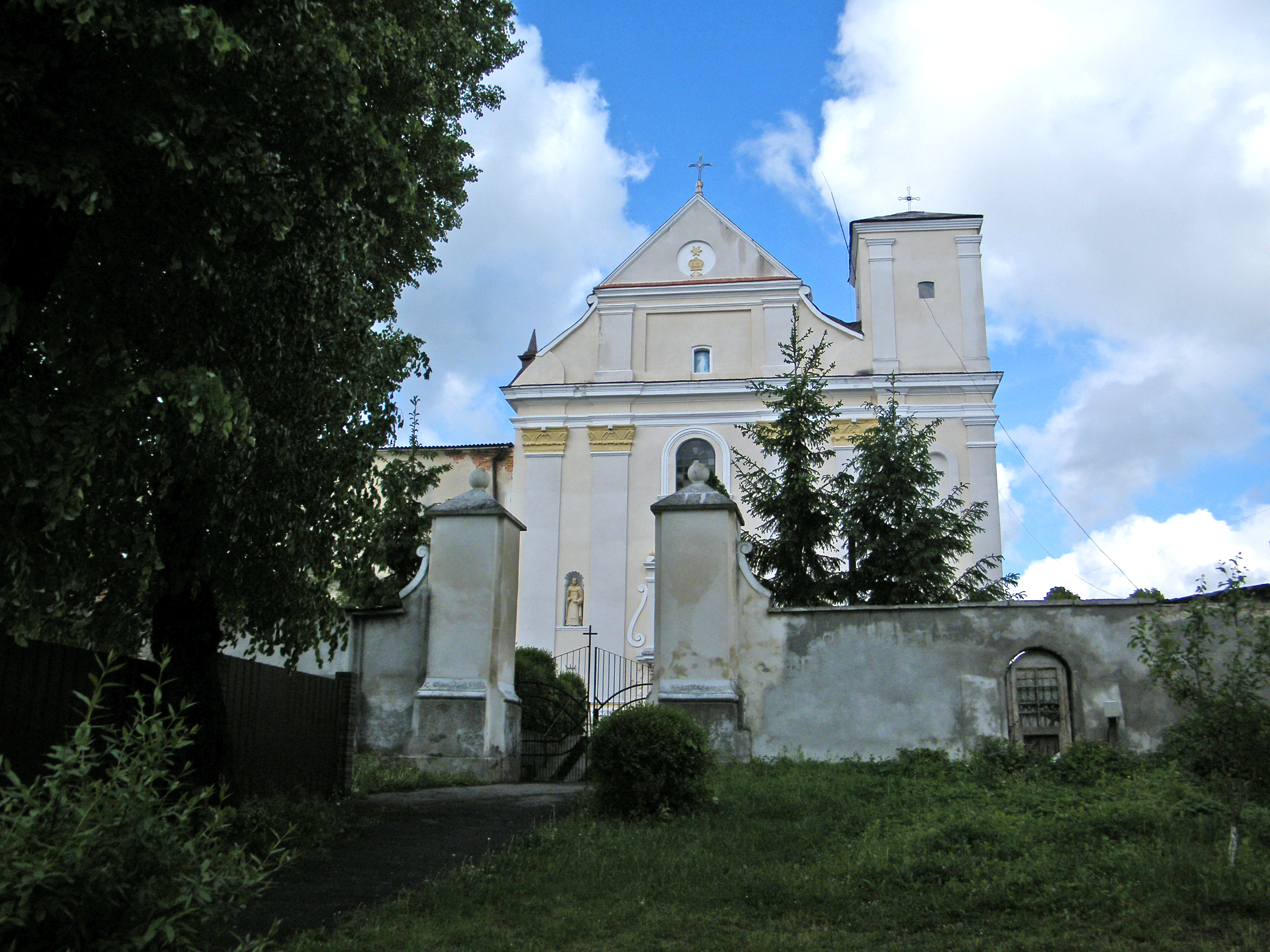
Church of St. Peter and St. Paul

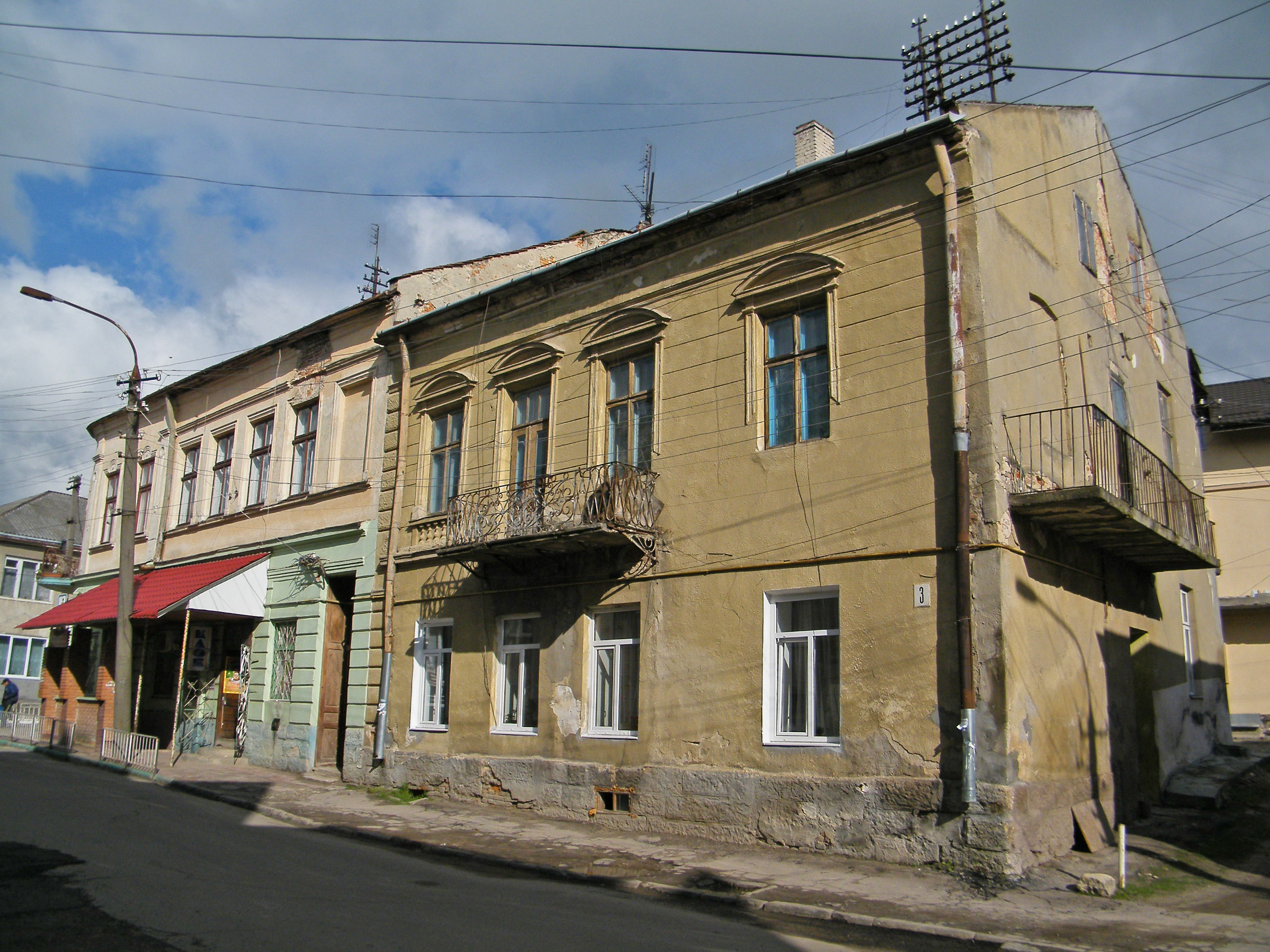
Peremyshliany old town

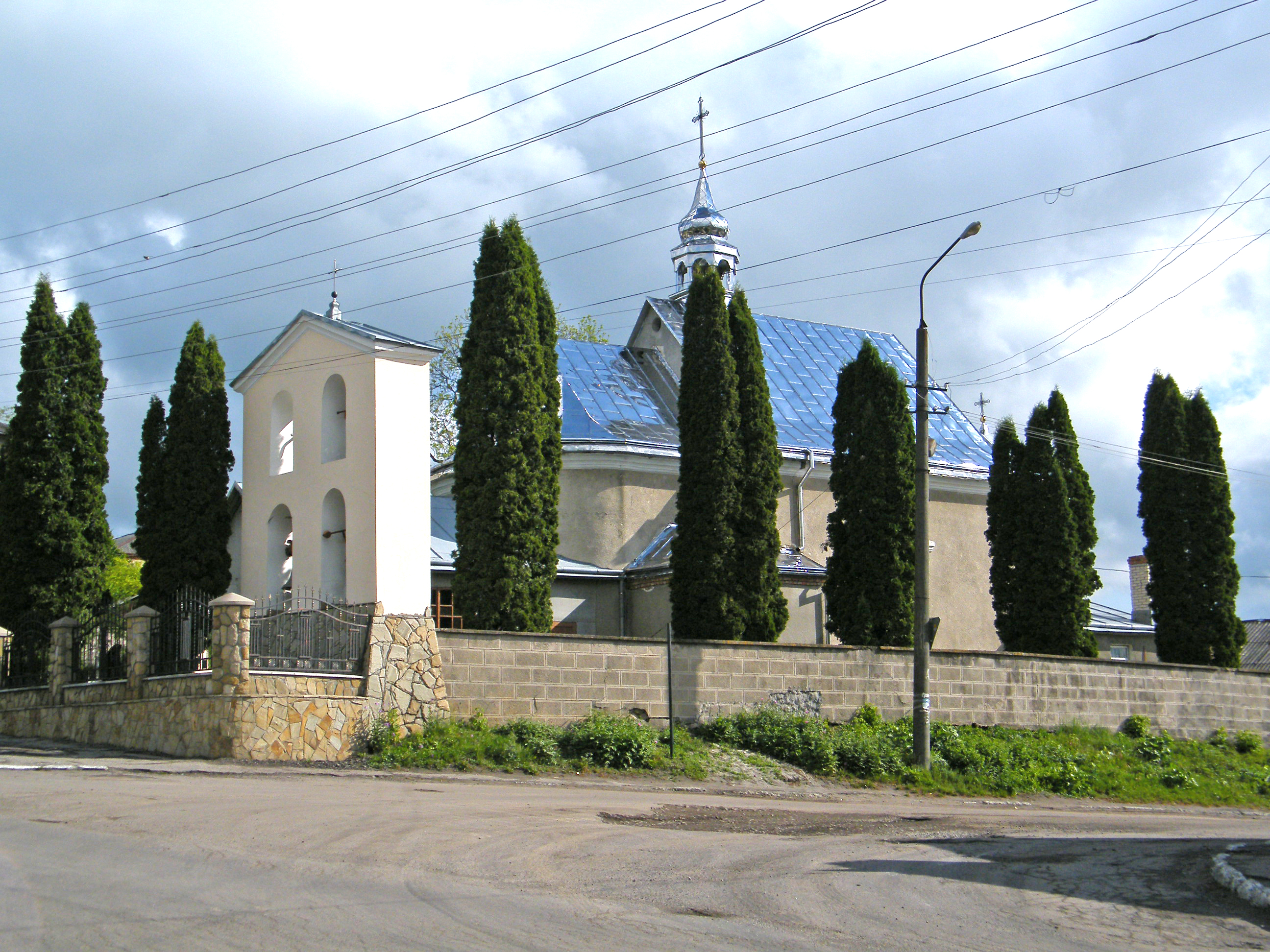
St. Nicholas Church

== See also ==
- Premishlan (Hasidic dynasty)
