= Peremyshliany Raion =

Former subdivision of Lviv Oblast, Ukraine

Peremyshliany Raion Перемишлянський район
- Raion
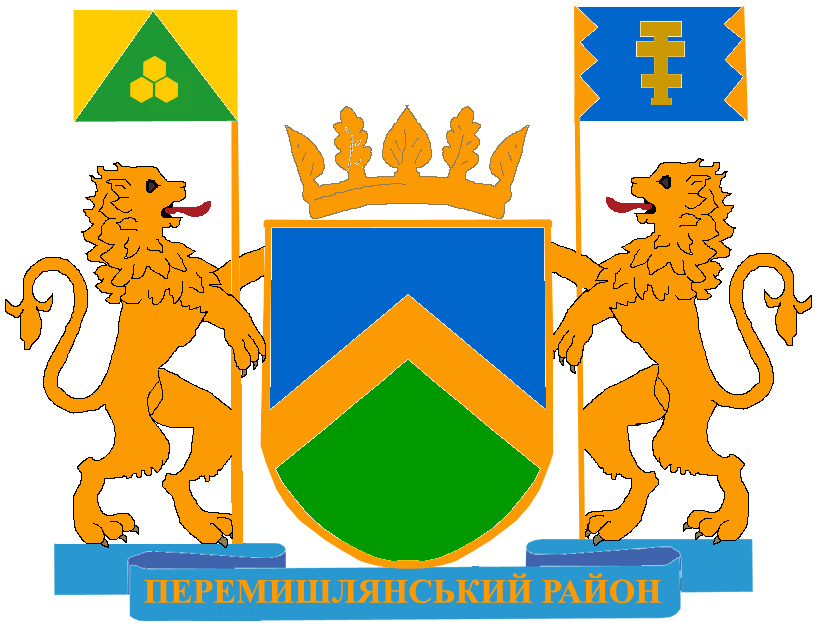
- Flag Coat of arms

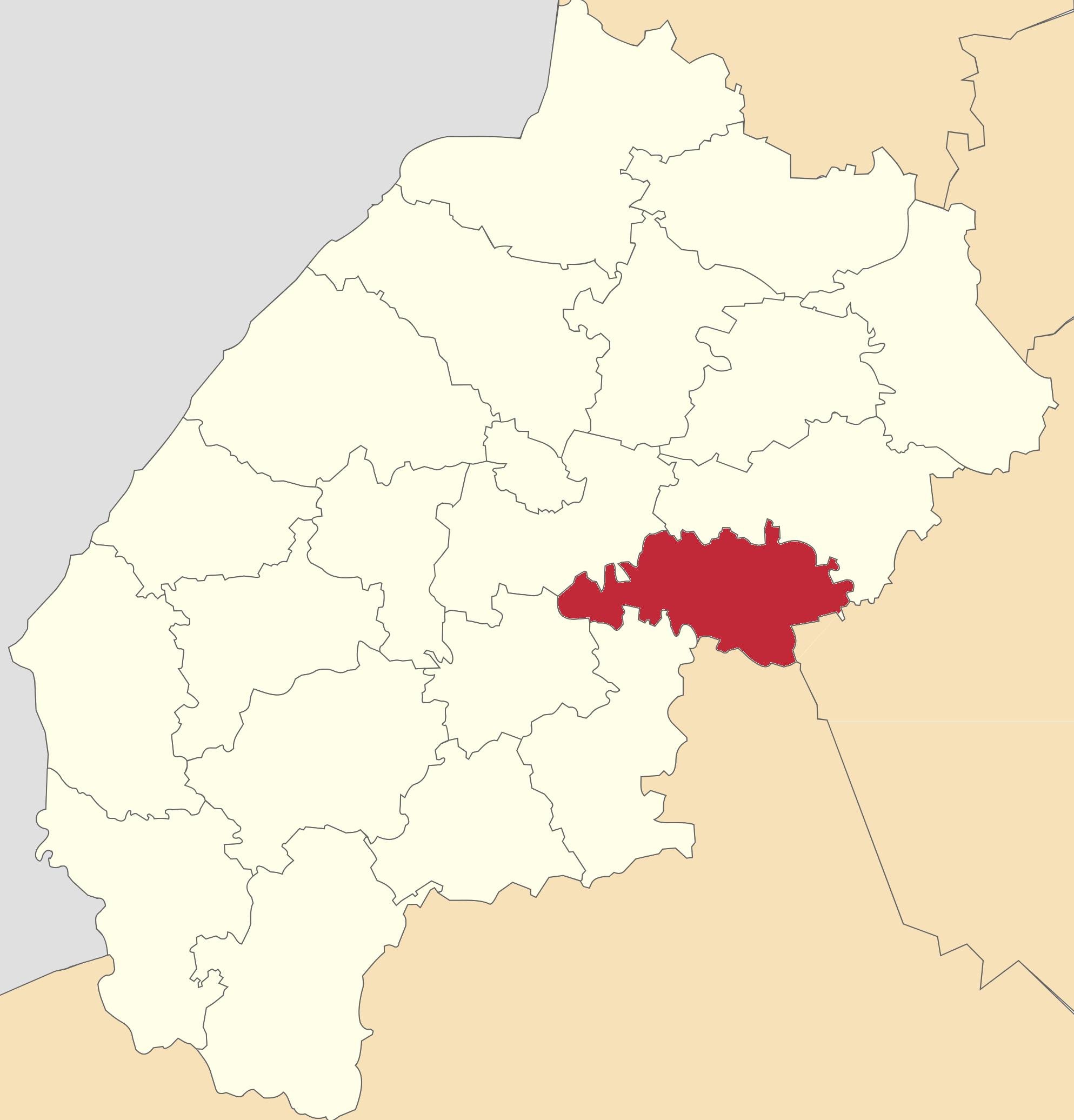
- Coordinates: 49°38′3″N 24°31′9″E
- Country: Ukraine
- Region: Lviv Oblast
- Established: 1939
- Disestablished: 18 July 2020
- Admin. center: Peremyshliany
- Subdivisions: List: — city councils; — settlement councils; — rural councils; Number of localities: — cities; — urban-type settlements; 87 — villages; — rural settlements

Area
  - Total: 918 km^{2} (354 sq mi)

Population (2020)
  - Total: 37,740
  - Density: 41.1/km^{2} (106/sq mi)
- Time zone: UTC+02:00 (EET)
  - Summer (DST): UTC+03:00 (EEST)
- Postal index: 81200—81264
- Area code: 380-3263

Peremyshliany Raion (Ukrainian: Перемишлянський район) was a raion (district) in Lviv Oblast in western Ukraine. Its administrative center was the city of Peremyshliany. The raion was abolished on 18 July 2020 as part of the administrative reform of Ukraine, which reduced the number of raions of Lviv Oblast to seven. The area of Peremyshliany Raion was merged into Lviv Raion. The last estimate of the raion population was 37,740 (2020 est.).

It was established in 1939.

At the time of disestablishment, the raion consisted of two hromadas:

- Bibrka urban hromada with the administration in the city of Bibrka;
- Peremyshliany urban hromada with the administration in Peremyshliany.

== See also ==
- Administrative divisions of Lviv Oblast
