= NKVD special groups =

The special groups of the NKVD for fighting against nationalists (Russian: Специальные группы НКВД по борьбе с националистами) were units set up by the People's Commissariat for Internal Affairs of the Soviet Union mainly in territories annexed by the USSR before the German-Soviet war due to the Molotov–Ribbentrop Pact, in particular they fought against the OUN and UPA in Ukraine (mostly Western), the Forest Brothers, in the Baltic states and against the Belarusian Black Cats, a special unit of the Schutzstaffel. They were also known as the Agent-Combat Groups (ABG), legend groups, false UPA detachments and the NKVD units dressed as UPA fighters.

After the NKVD reorganisation in 1946, the special groups kept on operating under the management of its successors, both the Ministry of Internal Affairs (MVD) and Ministry of State Security (NKGB) of the Soviet Union.

The special groups of the NKVD were operating in the Ukrainian SSR for ten years, since 1944 up to 1953. During that time, thousands of people were captured, arrested and killed by them.

== Prelude ==
Shortly before the Soviet-German war, significant territorial changes occurred on the Western Ukrainian ethnic lands. In March 1939 Carpatho-Ukraine declared its independence from Czechoslovakia but it was almost immediately occupied by the Kingdom of Hungary. East Galicia and Western Volyn were annexed by the USSR from Poland in October 1939, then the Soviet Union annexed Northern Bukovina and Bessarabia from the Kingdom of Romania in July 1940, due to the Molotov–Ribbentrop Pact.

In 1944 the Red Army moving to the west reconquered the territory of Western Ukraine that was occupied by Nazi Germany and its allies in 1941. The Soviet authorities faced considerable opposition from the local population during the restoration of the Soviet regime in these territories. At that time, the Ukrainian Insurgent Army (UPA) and the conspiratorial network of the Organization of Ukrainian Nationalists (OUN) were operating actively in Western Ukraine. In March 1944, in response to the situation, the NKVD Operational Headquarters was set up in Rivne to combat the Ukrainian national liberation movement.

Initially in the 1944-1945 years the Soviet leadership underestimated the scale of the liberation movement in Ukraine and mistakenly thought that they would have been able to cope easily with the rebels by the date of some Soviet public holiday, mainly using military operations. However soon they made sure of the futility of such an approach. UPA subunits tried to act using guerrilla warfare, avoiding open battles with overwhelming enemy forces. Since the second half of 1945, on the instructions of the UPA command, large units of the Ukrainian Insurgent Army began to be reorganized into well-united and armed smaller ones, that were deployed in forests. In addition, the extensive secret underground networks were created in rural areas, each had 10-15 people, and was called "boyivka (боївка)" - a militant group. As the result, the Soviet punitive-repressive authorities resorted to the extensive use of special tools.

== See also ==
- Little green men (Russo-Ukrainian War)
