= Ukrainian Insurgent Army =

Ukrainian nationalist partisan organisation active during and after World War II

- Українська повстанська армія
- Flag of the UPA
- Leaders: Vasyl Ivakhiv; Dmytro Klyachkivsky; Roman Shukhevych; Vasyl Kuk
- Dates active: 14 October 1942–1949; 1949–1956 (localized)
- Country: Ukrainian national government (1941)
- Active regions: Volhynia; Polesia; Galicia; Podolia; Carpathia
- Ideology: Ukrainian nationalism; Anti-communism; Anti-Polish sentiment; Anti-Russian sentiment; Anti-German sentiment; Antisemitism; Factions: Left-wing nationalism (Note: See People's Revolutionary Liberation Organisation.)
- Size: 20,000–200,000 (estimated)
- Part of: Organisation of Ukrainian Nationalists and Ukrainian Supreme Liberation Council
- Wars: Eastern Front of World War 2 Post-war Anti-Soviet insurgency in Ukraine

The Ukrainian Insurgent Army (Ukrainian: Українська повстанська армія, УПА, romanized: Ukrayinska Povstanska Armiya, abbreviated UPA) was a Ukrainian nationalist partisan formation founded by the Banderite faction (OUN-B) of the Organisation of Ukrainian Nationalists (OUN) on 14 October 1942 and existing until the 1950s. The UPA launched guerrilla warfare against the Soviet Union, against the Polish people (both the Polish Underground State resistance and Soviet-backed forces as well as against civilians), and against Nazi Germany, though in so doing initially motivated by anti-German ethnic exclusionary sentiment, and ultimately entering collaboration with the Germans on common anti-Communist ideological grounds by late 1944. The UPA carried out massacres of Poles in Volhynia and Eastern Galicia, which are recognized by Poland as a genocide.

The OUN aimed to establish an independent Ukrainian state. This goal, according to the OUN founding declaration, "was to be achieved by a national revolution led by a dictatorship" that would drive out occupying powers and then establish a "government representing all regions and social groups"; the OUN accepted violence as a political tool against enemies of their cause. In order to achieve this goal, a number of partisan units were formed, merged into a single structure in the form of the UPA, which was established on 14 October 1942. From February 1943, the organization fought against the Germans in Volhynia and Polesia. At the same time, its forces fought against the Polish Home Army, during which conflict the UPA carried out massacres of Poles in Volhynia and Eastern Galicia, resulting in the deaths of up to 100,000 Polish civilians. In 1944, as the German Army was retreating, the UPA continued its anti-German war by attacking the Wehrmacht's rear and seizing its equipment, but at the end of July 1944 the UPA formed a united front with Nazi Germany, ceasing attacks on the withdrawing Wehrmacht and defending against the Soviets in exchange for military aid. Soviet NKVD units fought against the UPA, which engaged in armed resistance against Soviets until 1949. On the territory of Communist Poland, the UPA tried to prevent the forced deportation of Ukrainians from western Galicia to the Soviet Union until 1947.

The UPA was a decentralized movement, widespread throughout Ukraine, and divided into three operational regions; each region followed a somewhat different agenda, given the circumstances of a constantly moving front-line and a double threat from both Soviet and Nazi forces. Not all UPA soldiers were members of the OUN or shared OUN's ideology.

The UPA was formally disbanded in early September 1949, but some of its units continued operations until late 1956. Officially, the UPA's last military engagement occurred in October 1956, when remnants of the group fought on the Hungarian border region in support of the attempted revolution in that country. In March 2019, surviving UPA members were officially granted the status of veterans by the government of Ukraine.

The UPA has a mixed legacy, both in Ukraine and abroad. While commemorated by many Ukrainians as heroes of their nation for anti-Nazi and anti-Soviet resistance, some Soviet Army veterans oppose their positive remembrance and only some UPA veterans have received official veteran status in March 2019, despite receiving other forms of commemoration along with monuments and memorials. Some UPA veterans have responded to Polish grievances over their past misdeeds by meeting with Polish veterans and apologizing. Despite controversies over the exhumation of UPA victims in Volhynia, Ukrainian and Polish historians have also collaborated on a multi-volume history of the two nations, including the fraught history during the UPA's era.

== Organization ==
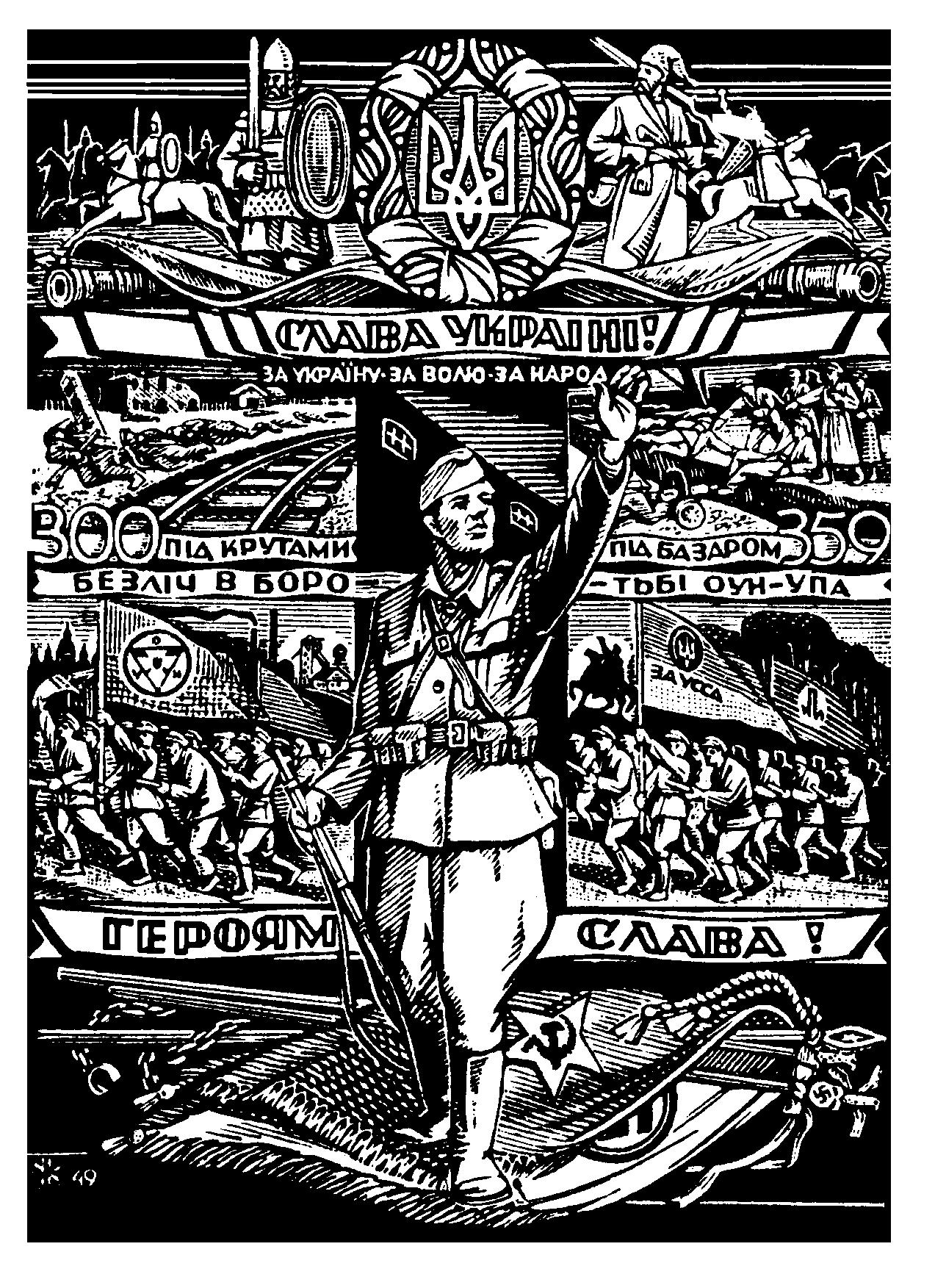
A UPA propaganda poster. The OUN/UPA's formal greeting is written in Ukrainian on two of horizontal lines Glory to Ukraine – Glory to (her) Heroes. The soldier is standing on the banners of the Soviet Union and Nazi Germany.

The UPA's command structure overlapped with that of the OUN-B (the more radical faction of the OUN after it split in 1940); local OUN and UPA leaders were frequently the same person. The OUN's military referents were the superiors of UPA unit commanders. The UPA was established in Volhynia and initially limited its activities to this region. Its first commander was the OUN military referent for Volhynia and Polesia, Vasyl Ivakhiv. In July, the UPA Supreme Command was organized with Dmytro Klyachkivsky at its head.

Organizationally, the UPA was divided into regions. the Western Operational Group operated in western Ukraine; the Southern Operational Group in the central-southern regions of Podolia and parts of Kyiv, Zhytomyr and Odesa oblasts; the Northern Operational Group in the northern regions of Volhynia, Rivne Oblast, and parts of Kyiv and Zhytomyr oblasts; in eastern Ukraine, the UPA fled north, as the Soviet Union had executed a number of the UPA's participants. The members of the Eastern Operational Group joined other UPA units in Dnipropetrovsk and Chernihiv oblasts.

In November 1943, the UPA adopted a new structure, creating a Main Military Headquarters and the General Staff. Roman Shukhevych headed the HQ, while Dmytro Hrytsai became chief of staff. The General Staff consisted of operations, intelligence, logistics, personnel, training, political education, and military inspectors departments. In addition to the three regions named above, there was also an attempt to create an Eastern Operational Group, including Kyiv and Zhytomyr oblasts, but the project never came to fruition. Similarly, the UPA-South region ceased to exist in the summer of 1944, but continued to appear in documents. Three military schools for low-level command staff were also established.

The UPA's largest unit type, the kurin, consisting of 500–700 soldiers, was equivalent to a battalion, and its smallest unit, the rii (literally bee swarm), with eight to ten soldiers, equivalent to a squad. Occasionally, and particularly in Volyn, during some operations three or more kurins would unite and form a zahin or brigade. Organizational methods were borrowed and adapted from the German, Polish and Soviet military, while UPA units based their training on a modified Red Army field unit manual.

In terms of UPA soldiers' social background, 60 percent were peasants of low to moderate means, 20 to 25 percent were from the working class (primarily from the rural lumber and food industries), and 15 percent were members of the intelligentsia (students, urban professionals). The latter group provided a large portion of the UPA's military trainers and officer corps. The number of UPA fighters varied: a German Abwehr report from November 1943 estimated that the UPA had 20,000 soldiers; other estimates at that time placed the number at 40,000. By the summer of 1944, estimates of UPA membership varied from 25,000 to 30,000 fighters, up to 100,000, or even 200,000 soldiers.

=== Structure ===
The Ukrainian Insurgent Army was structured into three units:

1. UPA-North
  Regions: Volhynia, Polissia.
  - Military District "Turiv"
    Commander – Maj. Rudyj.
    Squads: "Bohun", "Pomsta Polissja", "Nalyvajko".
  - Military District "Zahrava"
    Commander – Ptashka (Sylvester Zatovkanjuk).
    Squads: "Konovaletsj", "Enej", "Dubovyj", "Oleh".
  - Military District " Volhynia-South"
    Commander – Bereza.
    Squads: "Kruk", "H.".
2. UPA-West
  Regions: Halychyna, Bukovina, Zakarpattia, Zakerzonia.
  - Military District "Lysonja"
    Commander – Maj. Hrim, V.
    Kurins: "Holodnojarci", "Burlaky", "Lisovyky", "Rubachi", "Bujni", "Holky".
  - Military District "Hoverlja"
    Commander – Maj. Stepovyj (from 1945 – Major Hmara).
    Kurins: "Bukovynsjkyj", "Peremoha", "Hajdamaky", "Huculjskyj", "Karpatsjkyj".
  - Military District "Black Forest"
    Commander – Col. Rizun-Hrehit (Mykola Andrusjak).
    Kurins: "Smertonosci", "Pidkarpatsjkyj", "Dzvony", "Syvulja", "Dovbush", "Beskyd", "Menyky".
  - Military District "Makivka"
    Commander – Maj. Kozak.
    Kurins: "Ljvy", "Bulava", "Zubry", "Letuny", "Zhuravli", "Bojky of Chmelnytsjkyj", "Basejn".
  - Military District "Buh"
    Commander – Col. Voronnyj
    Kurins: "Druzhynnyky", "Halajda", "Kochovyky", "Perejaslavy", "Tyhry", "Perebyjnis"
  - Military District "Sjan"
    Commander – Orest
    Kurins: "Vovky", "Menyky", Kurin of Ren, Kurin of Eugene.
3. UPA-South
  Regions: Khmelnytskyi Oblast, Zhytomyr Oblast, southern region of Kyiv Oblast, southern regions of Ukraine,
  and especially in cities Odesa, Kryvyi Rih, Dnipropetrovsk, Mariupol, Donetsk.
  - Military District "Cholodnyj Jar"
    Commander – Kost'.
    Kurins: Kurin of Sabljuk, Kurin of Dovbush.
  - Military District "Umanj"
    Commander – Ostap.
    Kurins: Kurin of Dovbenko, Kurin of Buvalyj, Kurin of Andrij-Shum.
  - Military District "Vinnytsja"
    Commander – Jasen.
    Kurins: Kurin of Storchan, Kurin of Mamaj, Kurin of Burevij.

The fourth region, UPA-East, was planned, but never created.

=== Anthem ===
The anthem of the Ukrainian Insurgent Army was called the March of Ukrainian Nationalists, also known as We were born in a great hour (Ukrainian: Зродились ми великої години). The song, written by Oles Babiy, was officially adopted by the leadership of the Organization of Ukrainian Nationalists in 1932. The organization was a successor of the Ukrainian Sich Riflemen, whose anthem was "Chervona Kalyna". Leaders of the Ukrainian Sich Riflemen, Yevhen Konovalets and Andriy Melnyk, were founding members of the Organization of Ukrainian Nationalists. For this reason, "Chervona Kalyna" was also used by the Ukrainian Insurgent Army.

=== Flag ===
The flag of the UPA was a red-and-black banner, which continues to be a symbol of the Ukrainian nationalist movement. The colors of the flag symbolize "red Ukrainian blood spilled on the black Ukrainian earth. Use of the flag is also a "sign of the stubborn endurance of the Ukrainian national idea even under the grimmest conditions."

=== Awards ===
- Cross of Merit
- Cross of Combat Merit

== Military ranks ==
The UPA made use of a dual rank system that included functional command position designations and traditional military ranks. The functional system was developed due to an acute shortage of qualified and politically reliable officers during the early stages of organization.

Holovnyi Komandyr UIA	Krayevyi Komandyr	Komandyr Okrugu	Komandyr zagonu	Kurinnyi	Sotennyi	Chotovyi	Royovyi
Supreme commander	Regional commander	Division (military district) commander	Brigade (tactical sector) commander	Battalion commander	Company commander	Platoon leader	Squad leader

UPA rank structure consisted of at least seven commissioned officer ranks, four non-commissioned officer ranks, and two soldier ranks. The hierarchical order of known ranks and their approximate U.S. Army equivalent is as follows:

UPA RANKS	US ARMY EQUIVALENTS
Heneral-Khorunzhyj	Brigadier General
Polkovnyk	Colonel
Pidpolkovnyk	Lieutenant Colonel
Major	Major
Sotnyk	Captain
Poruchnyk	First Lieutenant
Khorunzhyj	Second Lieutenant
Starshyj Bulavnyj	Master Sergeant
Bulavnyj	Sergeant First Class
Starshyj Vistun	Staff Sergeant
Vistun	Sergeant
Starshyj Strilets	Private First Class
Strilets	Private

The rank scheme provided for three more higher general officer ranks: Heneral-Poruchnyk (Major General), Heneral-Polkovnyk (Lieutenant General), and Heneral-Pikhoty (General with Four Stars).

== Armaments ==
Initially, the UPA used weapons collected from the battlefields of 1939 and 1941. Later, they bought weapons from peasants and individual soldiers or captured them in combat. Some light weapons were also brought by deserting Ukrainian auxiliary policemen. For the most part, the UPA used light infantry weapons of Soviet and, to a lesser extent, German origin (for which ammunition was less readily obtainable). In 1944, German units armed the UPA directly with captured Soviet arms. Many kurins were equipped with light 51 mm and 82 mm mortars. During large-scale operations in 1943–1944, insurgent forces also used artillery (45 mm and 76.2 mm). In 1943 a light Hungarian tank was used in Volhynia.

In 1944, the Soviets captured a Polikarpov Po-2 aircraft and one armored car and one personnel carrier from the UPA; however, it was not stated that they were in operable condition, while no OUN/UPA documents noted the usage of such equipment. By the end of World War II in Europe, the NKVD had captured 45 artillery pieces (45 and 76.2 mm calibres) and 423 mortars from the UPA. In attacks against Polish civilians, axes and pikes were used. However, the light infantry weapon was the basic weapon used by the UPA.

== History ==
=== Formation ===
==== 1941 ====
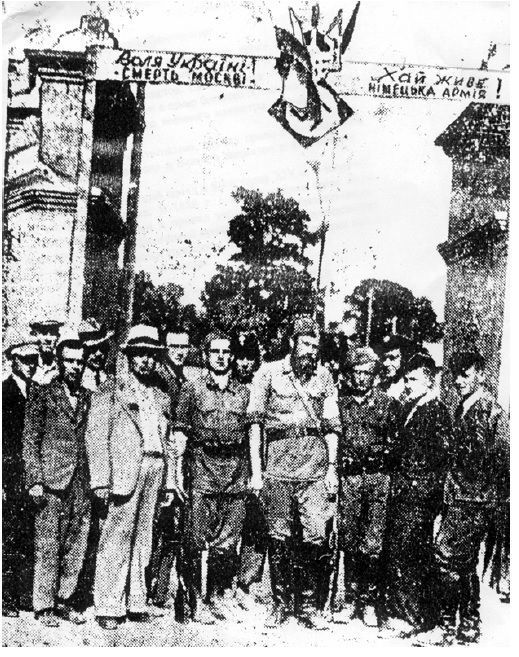
Taras Bulba-Borovets with his staff at a pro-German demonstration in the district of Sarny, September 1941

The first armed group to bear the name "Ukrainian Insurgent Army" was the Polissian Sich, formed by otaman Taras Bulba-Borovets in the vicinity of Olevsk in Volhynia soon after the beginning of the German-Soviet War. The initial goal of Borovets' force was to fight against the Bolsheviks, and it acted independently of German forces, operating against the remains of Soviet units in the area. However, in late 1941 the German command demanded from Borovets to dissolve his unit, after which the Polissian Sich moved into the underground. After its dissolution as a regular force, Polissian Sich became known as Ukrainian People's Revolutionary Army and fought against both Germans and Soviet partisans. During that period Borovets established ties with parts of OUN-M, which were active in the regions of Kremenets and Volodymyr.

In a memorandum from 14 August 1941, the OUN-B petitioned the Germans to create a Ukrainian Army "which [would] unite with the German Army... until [our] final victory", in exchange for German recognition of an allied, independent Ukrainian state. At the beginning of October 1941, during the first OUN-B Conference, the OUN-B formulated its future strategy. It called for transferring part of its organizational structure underground, in order to avoid conflict with the Germans. It also refrained from open anti-German propaganda activities. A captured German document of 25 November 1941 (Nuremberg Trial O14-USSR) ordered:

"It has been ascertained that the Bandera Movement [OUN-B] is preparing a revolt in the Reichskommissariat which has as its ultimate aim the establishment of an independent Ukraine. All functionaries of the Bandera Movement must be arrested at once and, after thorough interrogation, are to be liquidated..."

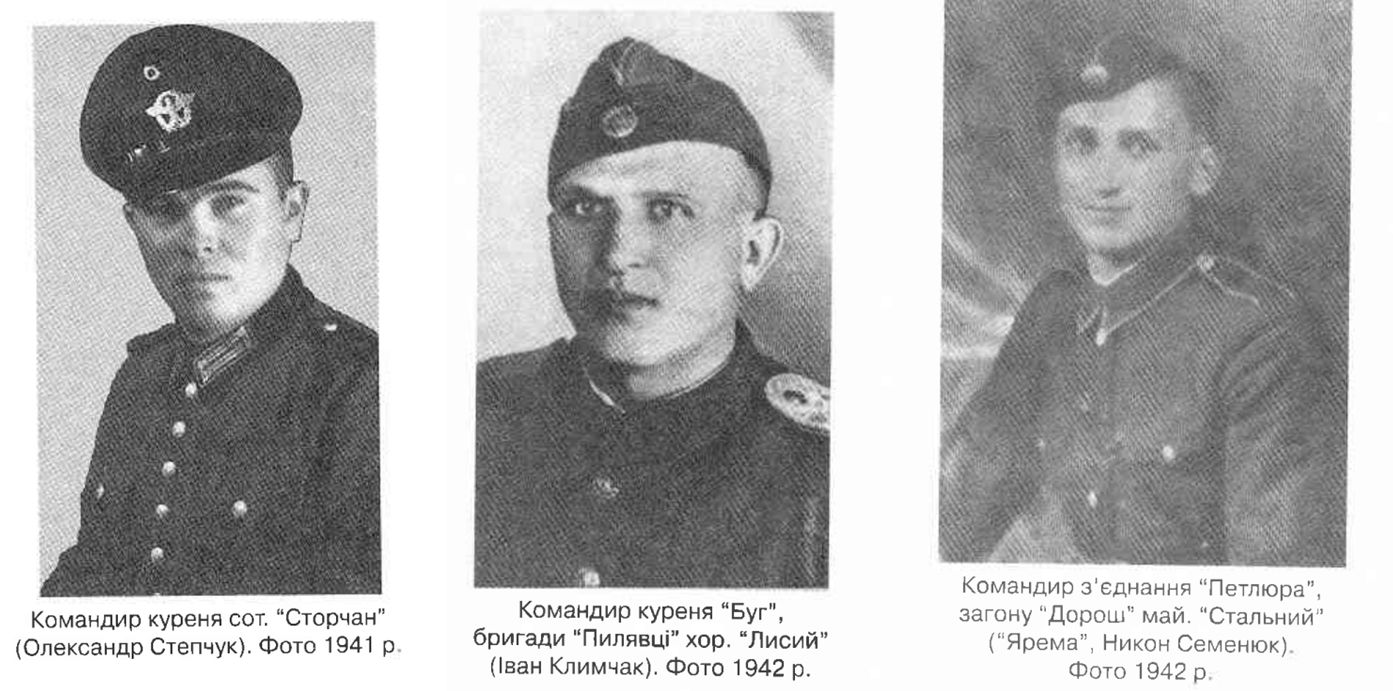
UPA Commanders left to right: Oleksander Stepchuk, Ivan Klimchak, Nikon Semeniuk 1941–1942

==== 1942 ====
At the Second Conference of the OUN-B, held in April 1942, the policies for the "creation, build-up and development of Ukrainian political and future military forces" and "action against partisan activity supported by Moscow" were adopted. Although German policies were criticized, the Soviet partisans were identified as the primary enemy of the OUN (B) and its future armed wing. The Military Conference of the OUN (B) met in December 1942 near Lviv. The conference resulted in the adoption of a policy of building up the OUN-B's military forces. The conference emphasized that "the entire combat capable population must support, under the OUN banner, the struggle against the Bolshevik enemy". On 30 May 1947, the Main Ukrainian Liberation Council (Головна Визвольна Рада) adopted the date of 14 October 1942—the feast of the Intercession of the Theotokos, and Ukrainian Cossacks' Day—as the official anniversary of the UPA.

Starting from autumn 1942, armed units established by OUN-B in Volhynia and Polesia adopted the name of Ukrainian Insurgent Army (UPA).

==== 1943 ====
On 18 August 1943 forces loyal to Bandera disarmed the Polissian Sich, with many members of Borovets' force entering the newly created army. UPA soon increased the scope of its activities, relying on the secret network established by the OUN-B in Northwestern Ukraine. The first commander of the UPA was Dmytro Kliachkivsky (alias Klym Savur), and its staff was headed by former colonel of the Ukrainian People's Republic Leonid Stupnytskyi. During its initial period the army was based in the region of Kostopil. Many former members of the Ukrainian Auxiliary Police, as well as numerous prisoners from the Red Army, many of them of Uzbek, Georgian, Azerbaijani and Tatar origin joined the UPA in 1943.

=== Relations with Germany ===
Ukrainian Anti-German Guerrilla War
- Part of the German–Ukrainian conflict (1941–1944) on Eastern Front of World War II
Date	Late 1941 – September 1944
Location	Ukraine
Result	Ukrainian victory

Belligerents
Ukrainian Insurgent Army (Since 1943) (Ukraine) Polissian Sich (Until 1943)	Germany: Schutzmannschaft Battalion 202; General Governorate Blue Police; Pro-German Cossacks; Turkic collaborators; Hungary; Romania; Slovakia

Commanders and leaders
Roman Shukhevych (Since 1943) (Ukraine) Taras Bulba-Borovets (Until 1943)	Erich Koch; Otto Wächter; Bach-Zelewski; Viktor Lutze †

Strength
40,000	10,000; 3 Battalions; 2 Regiments (Volyn-Polesia Operations)

Casualties and losses
2,251 killed; 536 captured	12,427 killed 2,448 captured (1943–1944)
- 5,000 civilians killed (Volyn-Polesia Operations)

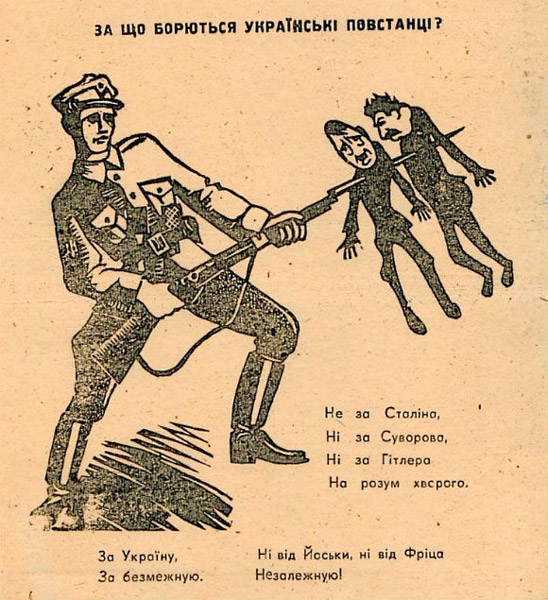
A UPA leaflet, which reads "No to Yoska (Joseph Stalin), no to Fritz (Hitler)"

The relationship between Ukrainian Insurgent Army and Nazi Germany varied on account of the intertwined interests of the two actors, as well as the decentralized nature of the UPA. Despite the stated opinions of Dmytro Klyachkivsky and Roman Shukhevych that the Germans were a secondary threat compared to their main enemies (the Communist forces of the Soviet Union and Poland), the Third Conference of the Organization of Ukrainian Nationalists, held near Lviv from 17 to 21 February 1943, decided to begin open warfare against the Germans (OUN fighters had already attacked a German garrison earlier that year on 7 February). Accordingly, on 20 March 1943, the OUN-B leadership issued secret instructions ordering their members who had joined the collaborationist Ukrainian Auxiliary Police in 1941–1942 to desert with their weapons and join with UPA units in Volhynia. This process often involved armed conflict with German forces trying to prevent this. The number of trained and armed personnel who joined the ranks of the UPA was estimated to be between 4 and 5 thousand.

Anti-German actions were limited to situations where the Germans attacked the Ukrainian population or UPA units. According to German general Ernst August Köstring, UPA fighters "fought almost exclusively against German administrative agencies, the German police and the SS in their quest to establish an independent Ukraine controlled by neither Moscow nor Germany." During the German occupation, the UPA conducted hundreds of raids on police stations and military convoys. In the region of Zhytomyr insurgents were estimated by the German General-Kommissar Leyser to be in control of 80% of the forests and 60% of the farmland. According to the OUN/UPA, on 12 May 1943, Germans attacked the town of Kolki using several SS-Divisions (SS units operated alongside the Wehrmacht who were responsible for intelligence, central security, policing action, and mass extermination), where both sides suffered heavy losses. Soviet partisans reported the reinforcement of German auxiliary forces at Kolki from the end of April until the middle of May 1943.

In June 1943, German SS and police forces under the command of Erich von dem Bach-Zelewski, the head of Himmler-directed Bandenbekämpfung ("bandit warfare"), attempted to destroy UPA-North in Volhynia during Operation BB (Bandenbekämpfung). According to Ukrainian claims, the initial stage of the operation produced no results whatsoever. This development was the subject of several discussions by Himmler's staff that resulted in General von dem Bach-Zelewski being sent to Ukraine. He failed to eliminate the UPA, which grew steadily, and the Germans, apart from terrorizing the civilian population, were virtually limited to defensive actions. In order to combat the UPA, the German command used both military force and propaganda methods, with leaflets spread by Germans to the local population claiming the insurgents to be "allies of Moscow".

From July through September 1943, in an estimated 74 clashes between German forces and the UPA, the Germans lost more than 3,000 men killed or wounded, while the UPA lost 1,237 killed or wounded. According to post-war estimates, the UPA had the following number of clashes with the Germans in mid-to-late 1943 in Volhynia: 35 in July, 24 in August, 15 in September and 47 during October–November. In the fall of 1943, clashes between the UPA and the Germans declined, so that Erich Koch in his November 1943 report and New Year 1944 speech could claim that "nationalistic bands in forests do not pose any major threat" for the Germans.

In the autumn of 1943, some detachments of the UPA attempted to find rapprochement with the Germans, despite a 25 November OUN/UPA order to the contrary. By the end of the year UPA had liberated from Germans large part of Rivne, Volyn and Zhytomyr regions, and engaged in raids in the areas of Kyiv and Kamianets-Podilskyi. According to Soviet sources, Ukrainian nationalist units were also active in Chernihiv and Kirovohrad regions. UPA also fought against German units in Galicia, which starting from October 1943 initiated a campaign of terror against the local Ukrainian population.

In early 1944, UPA forces in several Western regions cooperated with the German Wehrmacht, Waffen-SS, SiPo and SD. Nevertheless, the winter and spring of 1944 did not see a complete cessation of armed conflict between UPA and German forces, as the UPA continued to defend Ukrainian villages against the repressive actions of the German administration. For example, on 20 January, 200 German soldiers on their way to the Ukrainian village of Pyrohivka were forced to retreat after a several-hour long firefight with 80 UPA soldiers after having lost 30 killed and wounded. In March–July 1944, a senior leader of OUN-B in Galicia conducted negotiations with SD and SS officials, resulting in a German decision to supply the UPA with arms and ammunition. In May of that year, the OUN-B issued instructions to "switch the struggle, which had been conducted against the Germans, completely into a struggle against the Soviets."

In a top-secret memorandum, General-Major Brigadeführer Brenner wrote in mid-1944 to SS-Obergruppenführer General Hans-Adolf Prützmann, the highest ranking German SS officer in Ukraine, that "The UPA has halted all attacks on units of the German army. The UPA systematically sends agents, mainly young women, into the enemy-occupied territory, and the results of the intelligence are communicated to Department 1c of the [German] Army Group" on the southern front. By the autumn of 1944, the German press was full of praise for the UPA for their anti-Bolshevik successes, referring to the UPA fighters as "Ukrainian fighters for freedom" In the latter half of 1944, Germans were supplying the OUN/UPA with arms and equipment in exchange for the end of attacks on German positions, along with further UPA attacks on the Soviets. In the Ivano-Frankivsk region, there even existed a small landing strip for German transport planes. Some German personnel trained in terrorist and intelligence activities behind Soviet lines, as well as some OUN-B leaders, were also transported through this channel.

Adopting a strategy analogous to that of the Chetnik leader General Draža Mihailović, the UPA limited its actions against the Germans in order to better prepare itself for and engage in the struggle against the Communists. Because of this, although the UPA managed to limit German activities to a certain extent, it failed to prevent the Germans from deporting approximately 500,000 people from Western Ukraine and from economically exploiting Western Ukraine. Due to its focus on the Soviets as the principal threat, the UPA's anti-German struggle did not contribute significantly to the recapture of Ukrainian territories by Soviet forces.

=== Fight against Poland ===
==== Massacres of Poles in Volhynia and Eastern Galicia ====
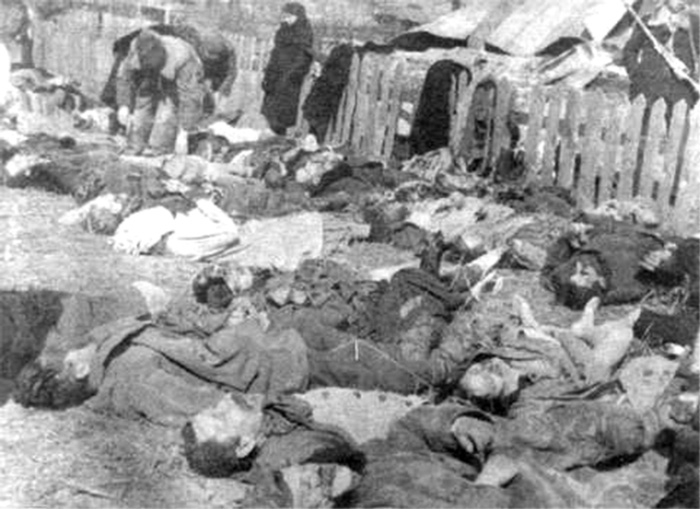
Polish victims of a massacre committed by UPA in the village of Lipniki, 1943

In 1943, the UPA adopted a policy of massacring and expelling the Polish population, east of the Bug River. In March 1943, the OUN-B (specifically Mykola Lebed) imposed a collective death sentence on all Poles living in the former south-eastern Kresy region of the Second Polish Republic, and a few months later, local units of the UPA were instructed to complete the operation. The UPA commanders behind the decision, were Dmytro Klyachkivsky, Vasyl Ivakhov, Ivan Lytvynchuk and Petro Oliynyk.

The ethnic cleansing against Poles began on a large scale in Volhynia in late February (or early Spring) of that year and lasted until the end of 1944. Taras Bulba-Borovets, the founder of the original UPA, criticized the attacks as soon as they began:

The axe and the flail have gone into motion. Whole families are butchered and hanged, and Polish settlements are set on fire. The “hatchet men,” to their shame, butcher and hang defenceless women and children.... By such work Ukrainians not only do a favor for the SD [German security service], but also present themselves in the eyes of the world as barbarians. We must take into account that England will surely win this war, and it will treat these “hatchet men” and lynchers and incendiaries as agents in the service of Hitlerite cannibalism, not as honest fighters for their freedom, not as state-builders.

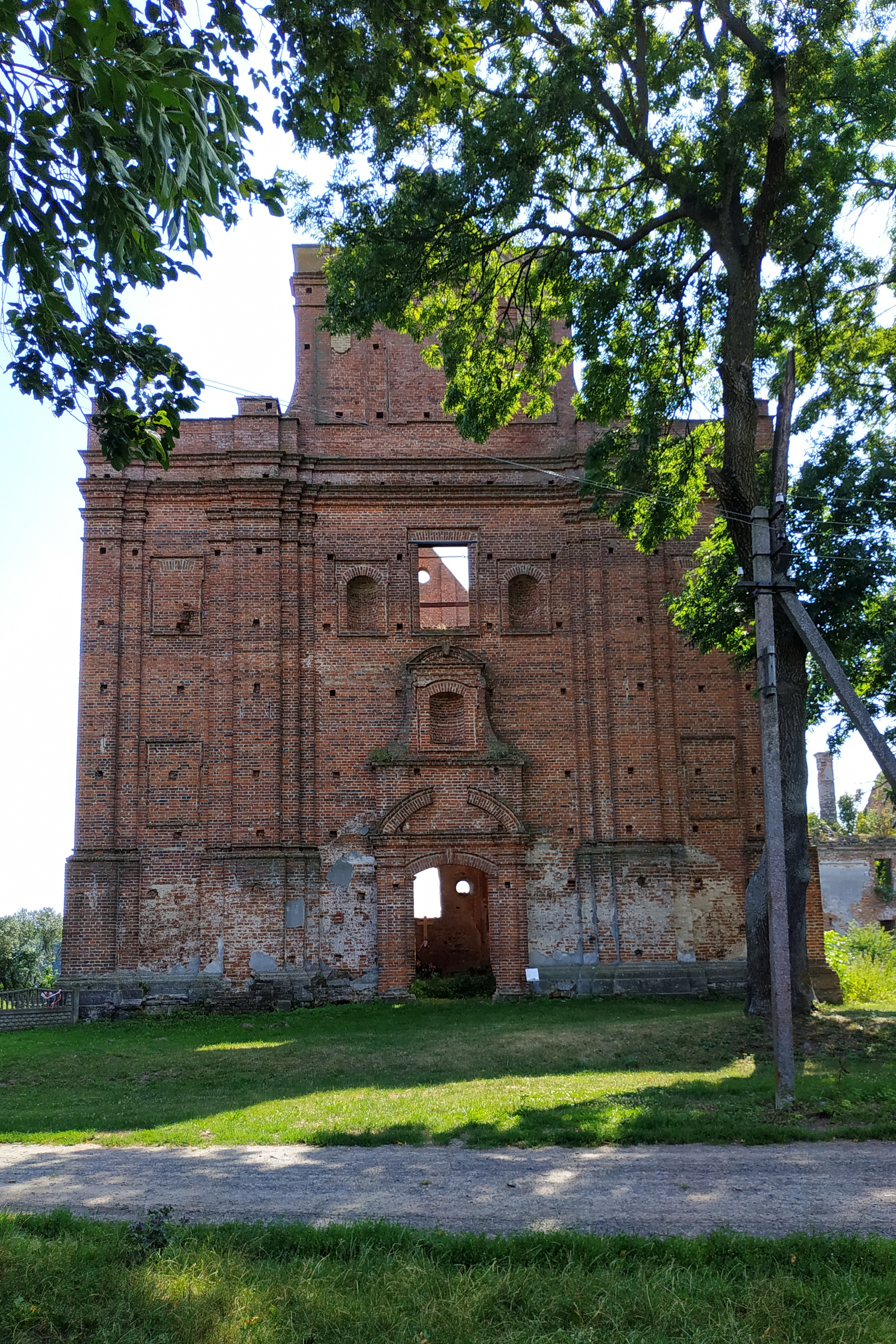
Ruins of the Roman Catholic church in Kisielin. The Kisielin massacre was a slaughter of Polish worshippers on 11 July 1943 during Sunday Mass service.

11 July 1943, the Volhynian Bloody Sunday, was one of the deadliest days of the massacres, with UPA units marching from village to village, killing Polish civilians. On that day, UPA units surrounded and attacked 99 Polish villages and settlements in three counties – Kovel, Horokhiv, and Volodymyr. On the following day, 50 additional villages were attacked. In January 1944, the UPA campaign of ethnic cleansing spread to the neighboring province of Galicia. Unlike in Volhynia, where Polish villages were destroyed and their inhabitants murdered without warning, Poles in eastern Galicia were in some instances given the choice of fleeing or being killed. Ukrainian peasants sometimes joined the UPA in the violence, and large bands of armed marauders, unaffiliated with the UPA, brutalized civilians. In other cases however, Ukrainian civilians took steps to protect their Polish neighbors, either by hiding them during the UPA raids or vouching that the Poles were actually Ukrainians.

The methods used by the UPA to carry out the massacres were particularly brutal and were committed indiscriminately without any restraint. Historian Norman Davies describes the killings:

"Villages were torched. Roman Catholic priests were axed or crucified. Churches were burned with all their parishioners. Isolated farms were attacked by gangs carrying pitchforks and kitchen knives. Throats were cut. Pregnant women were bayoneted. Children were cut in two. Men were ambushed in the field and led away."

In total, the estimated numbers of Polish civilians killed in Volhynia and Galicia is between 60,000 and 120,000. (Note: The exact number of ethnic Polish fatal victims is unknown. Most estimates vary between 50,000, or 100,000, depending on the source used; lower and higher numbers are occasionally cited too when different regions and perpetrators are included. A neutral halfway point between the most often cited numbers that was mentioned in an IPN conference of Polish and Ukrainian scholars is 85,000 deaths.) Victims of the UPA included Ukrainians who did not adhere to its form of nationalism and so were considered traitors. After the initiation of the massacres, Polish self-defense units responded by attacking the UPA and their accomplices, however specific order were given not to target the general Ukrainian population. Estimates of Ukrainians killed in acts of reprisal range from 2,000 to 30,000. On 22 July 2016, the Sejm of the Republic of Poland passed a resolution declaring the massacres committed by the UPA a genocide.

==== Post-war ====
Westward shift of Poland after World War II. The respective German, Polish and Ukrainian populations were expelled.

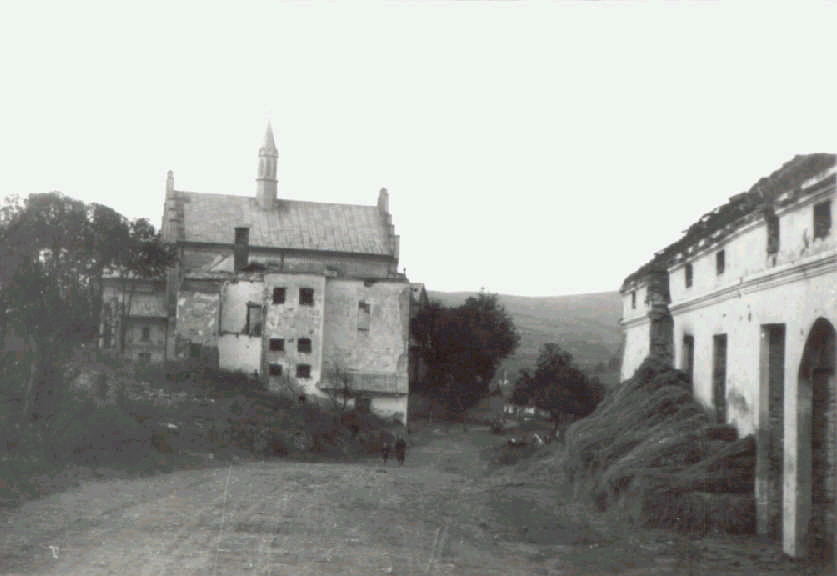
The village of Bukowsko was attacked and burned several times by UPA between January and November, 1946.

After Galicia had been taken over by the Red Army, many units of the UPA abandoned the anti-Polish course of action and some even began cooperating with local Polish anti-Communist resistance against the Soviets and the NKVD. Many Ukrainians, who had not participated in the anti-Polish massacres, joined the UPA after the war on both the Soviet and Polish sides of the border. Local agreements between the UPA and the Polish post-Home Army units began to appear as early as April/May 1945 and in some places lasted until 1947, such as in the Lublin Voivodeship. One such joint action of the UPA and the post-Home Army Freedom and Independence Association (WiN) took place in May 1946, when the two partisan formations coordinated their attack and took over of the city of Hrubieszów. Despite such agreements, other UPA units continued their attacks against the Polish civilian population. In one such action, UPA insurgents and German deserters led by a SS Colonel, burned several villages in the Sanok region.

The tactical cooperation between the UPA and the post-Home Army underground came about partly as a response to increasing Communist terror and the forced population exchange between Poland and Ukraine. According to official statistics, between 1944 and 1956 around 488,000 Ukrainians and 789,000 Poles were transferred. On the territories of present-day Poland, 8,000–12,000 Ukrainians were killed and 6,000–8,000 Poles, between 1943 and 1947. However, unlike in Volhynia, most of the casualties occurred after 1944 and involved UPA soldiers and Ukrainian civilians on one side, and members of the Polish Communist Security Office (UB) and Border Protection Troops (WOP). Out of the 2,200 Poles who died in the fighting between 1945 and 1948, only a few hundred were civilians, with the remainder being functionaries or soldiers of the Communist regime in Poland.

=== Fight against the Soviet Union ===
==== German occupation ====
The total number of local Soviet partisans acting in Western Ukraine was never high, due to the region enduring only two years of German rule (in some places even less). In 1943, the Soviet partisan leader Sydir Kovpak was sent to the Carpathian Mountains, with help from Nikita Khrushchev. He described his mission to western Ukraine in his book Vid Putivlia do Karpat (From Putyvl to the Carpathian Mountains). Well armed by supplies delivered to secret airfields, he formed a group consisting of several thousand men which moved deep into the Carpathians. Attacks by the German Luftwaffe and military forced Kovpak to break up his force into smaller units in 1944; on their way back these groups were attacked by UPA units, which had first appeared in Galicia in June 1943 under the name of Ukrainian People's Self-Defence. Soviet NKVD agent Nikolai Kuznetsov was captured and executed by UPA members after unwittingly entering their camp while wearing a Wehrmacht officer uniform.

==== Fighting ====
As the Red Army approached Galicia, the UPA avoided clashes with the regular units of the Soviet military. Instead, the UPA focused its energy on NKVD units and Soviet officials of all levels, from NKVD and military officers to the school teachers and postal workers attempting to establish Soviet administration.

In March 1944, UPA insurgents mortally wounded front commander Army General Nikolai Vatutin, who captured Kiev when he led Soviet forces in the Second battle of Kiev. Several weeks later an NKVD battalion was annihilated by the UPA near Rivne. This resulted in a full-scale operation in the spring of 1944, initially involving 30,000 Soviet troops against the UPA in Volhynia. Estimates of casualties vary depending on the source. In a letter to the State Defense Committee of the USSR, Lavrentiy Beria stated that in spring 1944 clashes between Soviet forces and the UPA resulted in 2,018 killed and 1,570 captured UPA fighters and only 11 Soviets killed and 46 wounded. A captured UPA member, quoted in Soviet archives, stated that he received reports about UPA losses of 200 fighters against 2,000 Soviet losses. The first significant sabotage operations against communications of the Soviet Army before their offensive against the Germans was conducted by the UPA in April–May 1944. Such actions were promptly stopped by the Soviet Army and NKVD troops, after which the OUN/UPA submitted an order to temporarily cease anti-Soviet activities and prepare for the further struggle against the Soviets.

Despite heavy casualties on both sides during the initial clashes, the struggle was inconclusive. New large-scale actions of the UPA, especially in Ternopil Oblast, were launched in July–August 1944, when the Red Army advanced West. By the autumn of 1944, UPA forces enjoyed virtual freedom of movement over an area of 160,000 square kilometers in size and home to over 10 million people, and had established a shadow government.

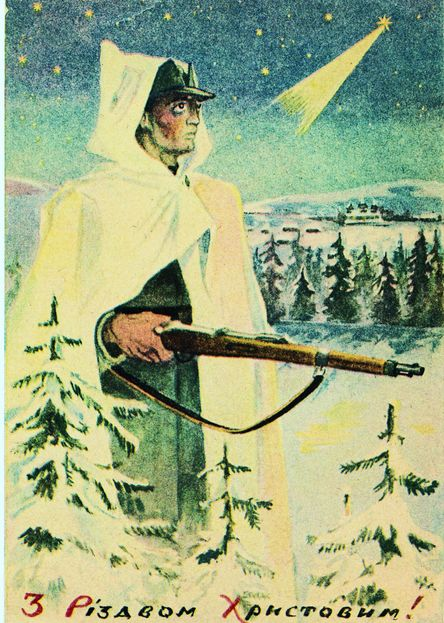
Christmas card made and distributed by the UPA, 1945

In November 1944, Khrushchev launched the first of several large-scale Soviet assaults on the UPA throughout Western Ukraine, involving—according to OUN/UPA estimates—at least 20 NKVD combat divisions supported by artillery and armoured units. Soviet forces blockaded villages and roads, and set forests on fire. Soviet archival data states that on 9 October 1944, one NKVD Division, eight NKVD brigades, and an NKVD cavalry regiment with a total of 26,304 NKVD soldiers were stationed in Western Ukraine. In addition, two regiments with 1,500 and 1,200 persons, one battalion (517 persons) and three armoured trains with 100 additional soldiers each, as well as one border guard regiment and one unit were starting to relocate there in order to reinforce them.

By the end of 1944, the number of UPA fighters had declined to 20-25,000, down from over 40,000 at the beginning of the year. During late 1944 and the first half of 1945, according to Soviet data, the UPA suffered approximately 89,000 killed, approximately 91,000 captured, and approximately 39,000 surrendered while the Soviet forces lost approximately 12,000 killed, approximately 6,000 wounded and 2,600 MIA. In addition, during this time, according to Soviet data UPA actions resulted in the killing of 3,919 civilians and the disappearance of 427 others. Despite the heavy losses, as late as summer 1945, many battalion-size UPA units still continued to control and administer large areas of territory in Western Ukraine. In February 1945 the UPA issued an order to liquidate kurins (battalions) and sotnyas (companies) and to operate predominantly in chotys (platoons).

==== Spring 1945–late 1946 ====
After Germany surrendered in May 1945, the Soviet authorities turned their attention to the guerrilla wars taking place in Ukraine and the Baltics. Combat units were reorganized and special forces were sent in. One of the major complications that arose was the local support the UPA had from the population. Areas of UPA activity were depopulated. The estimates on numbers deported vary; officially Soviet archives state that between 1944 and 1952 a total of 182,543 people were deported while other sources indicate the number may have been as high as to 500,000.

Mass arrests of suspected UPA informants or family members were conducted; between February 1944 and May 1946 over 250,000 people were arrested in Western Ukraine. Those arrested typically experienced beatings or other violence. Those suspected of being UPA members underwent torture; reports exist of some prisoners being burned alive. The many arrested women believed to be affiliating with the UPA were subjected to torture, deprivation, and rape at the hands of Soviet security in order to "break" them and get them to reveal UPA members' identities and locations or to turn them into Soviet double-agents. Mutilated corpses of captured rebels were put on public display. Ultimately, between 1944 and 1952 alone as many as 600,000 people may have been arrested in Western Ukraine, with about one-third executed and the rest imprisoned or exiled.

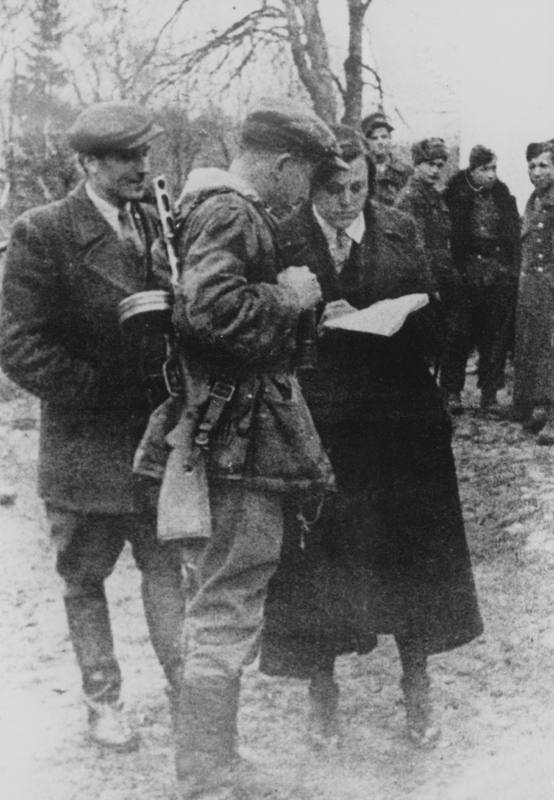
Roman Shukhevych, the leader of the UPA

The UPA responded to the Soviet methods by unleashing their own terror against Soviet activists, suspected collaborators and their families. This work was particularly attributed to the Sluzhba Bezpeky (SB), the anti-espionage wing of the UPA. In a typical incident in the Lviv region, in front of horrified villagers, UPA troops gouged out the eyes of two entire families suspected of reporting on insurgent movements to Soviet authorities, before hacking their bodies to pieces. Due to public outrage concerning these violent punitive acts, the UPA stopped the practice of killing the families of collaborators by mid-1945. Other victims of the UPA included Soviet activists sent to Galicia from other parts of the Soviet Union; heads of village Soviets, those sheltering or feeding Red Army personnel, and even people turning food into collective farms. The effect of such terrorist acts was such that people refused to take posts as village heads, and until the late 1940s villages chose single men with no dependents as their leaders.

The UPA also proved to be especially adept at assassinating key Soviet administrative officials. According to NKVD data, between February 1944 and December 1946 11,725 Soviet officers, agents and collaborators were assassinated and 2,401 were "missing", presumed kidnapped, in Western Ukraine. In one county in Lviv region alone, from August 1944 until January 1945 Ukrainian rebels killed 10 members of the Soviet active and a secretary of the county Communist party, and also kidnapped four other officials. The UPA travelled at will throughout the area. In this county, there were no courts, no prosecutor's office, and the local NKVD only had three staff members.

According to a 1946 report by Khrushchev's deputy for West Ukrainian affairs A. A. Stoiantsev, out of 42,175 operations and ambushes against the UPA by destruction battalions in Western Ukraine, only 10 percent had positive results – in the vast majority there was either no contact or the individual unit was disarmed and pro-Soviet leaders murdered or kidnapped. Morale amongst the NKVD in Western Ukraine was particularly low. Even within the dangerous context of Soviet state service in the late-Stalin era, West Ukraine was considered to be a "hardship post", and personnel files reveal higher rates of transfer requests, alcoholism, nervous breakdowns, and refusal to serve among NKVD field agents there at that time.

The first success of the Soviet authorities came in early 1946 in the Carpathians, which were blockaded from 11 January until 10 April. The UPA operating there ceased to exist as a combat unit. The continuous heavy casualties elsewhere forced the UPA to split into small units consisting of 100 soldiers. Many of the troops demobilized and returned home, when the Soviet Union offered three amnesties during 1947–1948. By 1946, the UPA was reduced to a core group of 5,000–10,000 fighters, and large-scale UPA activity shifted to the Soviet-Polish border. Here, in 1947, they killed the Polish Communist deputy defence minister General Karol Świerczewski. In spring 1946, the OUN/UPA established contacts with the Intelligence services of France, Great Britain and US.

==== End of UPA resistance ====
The turning point in the struggle against the UPA came in 1947 when the Soviets established an intelligence gathering network within the UPA and shifted the focus of their actions from mass terror to infiltration and espionage. After 1947 the UPA's activity began to subside. On May 30, 1947, Shukhevych issued instructions for joining the OUN-B and UPA in underground warfare. In 1947–1948 UPA resistance was weakened enough to allow the Soviets to begin implementation of large-scale collectivization throughout Western Ukraine.

In 1948, the Soviet central authorities purged local officials who had mistreated peasants and engaged in "vicious methods". At the same time, Soviet agents planted within the UPA had taken their toll on morale and on the UPA's effectiveness. According to the writing of one slain Ukrainian rebel, "the Bolsheviks tried to take us from within...you can never know exactly in whose hands you will find yourself. From such a network of spies, the work of whole teams is often penetrated...". In November 1948, the work of Soviet agents led to two important victories against the UPA: the defeat and deaths of the heads of the most active UPA network in Western Ukraine, and the removal of "Myron", the head of the UPA's counter-intelligence SB unit.

The Soviet authorities tried to win over the local population by making significant economic investments in Western Ukraine, and by setting up rapid reaction groups in many regions to combat the UPA. According to one retired MVD major, "By 1948 ideologically we had the support of most of the population." The UPA's leader, Roman Shukhevych, was killed during an ambush near Lviv on 5 March 1950. Although sporadic UPA activity continued until the mid-1950s, after Shukhevich's death the UPA rapidly lost its fighting capability. An assessment of UPA manpower by Soviet authorities on 17 April 1952 claimed that UPA/OUN had only 84 fighting units consisting of 252 persons. The UPA's last commander, Vasyl Kuk, was captured on 24 May 1954. Despite the existence of some insurgent groups, according to a report by the MGB of the Ukrainian SSR, the "liquidation of armed units and OUN underground was accomplished by the beginning of 1956".

NKVD units dressed as UPA fighters are known to have committed atrocities against the civilian population in order to discredit the UPA. Among these NKVD units were those composed of former UPA fighters working for the NKVD. The Security Service of Ukraine (SBU) recently published information that about 150 such special groups consisting of 1,800 people operated until 1954. Prominent people killed by UPA insurgents during the anti-Soviet struggle included Metropolitan Oleksiy (Hromadsky) of the Ukrainian Autonomous Orthodox Church, killed while traveling in a German convoy, and pro-Soviet writer Yaroslav Halan.

In 1951, CIA covert operations chief Frank Wisner estimated that some 35,000 Soviet police troops and Communist party cadres had been eliminated by guerrillas affiliated with the Ukrainian Insurgent Army in the period after the end of World War II. Official Soviet figures for the losses inflicted by all types of Ukrainian nationalists during the period 1944–1953 referred to 30,676 persons; amongst them were 687 NKGB-MGB personnel, 1,864 NKVD-MVD personnel, 3,199 Soviet Army, Border Guards, and NKVD-MVD troops, 241 Communist party leaders, 205 Komsomol leaders and 2,590 members of self-defense units. According to Soviet data, the remaining losses were among civilians, including 15,355 peasants and kolkhozniks. Soviet archives state that between February 1944 and January 1946 the Soviet forces conducted 39,778 operations against the UPA, during which they killed a total of 103,313, captured a total of 8,370 OUN members and captured a total of 15,959 active insurgents. Many UPA members were imprisoned in the Gulag. They actively participated in Gulag uprisings of Norilsk, Vorkuta, and Kengir.

==== Soviet infiltration ====
In 1944–1945 the NKVD carried out 26,693 operations against the Ukrainian underground. These resulted in the deaths of 22,474 Ukrainian soldiers and the capture of 62,142 prisoners. During this time the NKVD formed special groups known as spetshrupy made up of former Soviet partisans. The goal of these groups was to discredit and disorganize the OUN and UPA. In August 1944, Sydir Kovpak was placed under NKVD authority. Posing as Ukrainian insurgents, these special formations used violence against the civilian population of Western Ukraine. In June 1945 there were 156 such special groups with 1,783 members.

From December 1945 to 1946, 15,562 operations were carried out in which 4,200 were killed and more than 9,400 were arrested. From 1944 to 1953, the Soviets killed 153,000 and arrested 134,000 members of the UPA. 66,000 families (204,000 people) were forcibly deported to Siberia and half a million people were subject to repression. In the same period, Polish Communist authorities deported 450,000 people. Soviet infiltration of British intelligence also meant that MI6 assisted in training some of the guerrillas in parachuting and unmarked planes used to drop them into Ukraine from bases in Cyprus and Malta, were counter-acted by the fact that one MI6 agent with knowledge of the operation was Kim Philby. Working with Anthony Blunt, he alerted Soviet security forces about planned drops. Ukrainian guerrillas were intercepted and most were executed.

=== Participation in the Holocaust ===
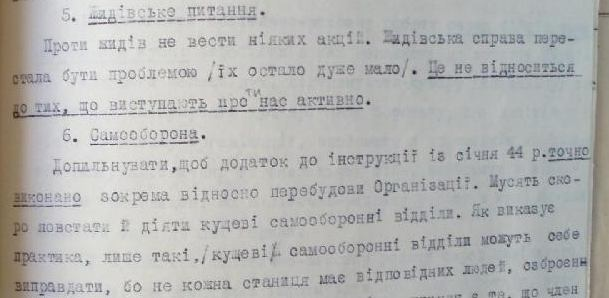
Ukrainian Insurgent Army, September 1944 Instruction abstract. Text in Ukrainian: "Jewish question" – "No actions against Jews to be taken. Jewish issue is no longer a problem (only few of them remain). This does not apply to those who stand out against us actively."

The OUN-B pursued a policy of infiltrating the German police to obtain weapons and training for fighters. In that role, it helped the Germans to carry out the Holocaust. The Ukrainian Auxiliary Police, working for the Germans, played a crucial supporting role in the murder of 200,000 Jews in Volhynia in the second half of 1942. Most of the police deserted in the following spring and joined the UPA. Historian Shmuel Spector estimated in 1990 that the UPA and OUN together hunted down and killed several thousand Jews. With the first antisemitic ideology and acts traced back to the Russian Civil War, by 1940–1941 the publications of Ukrainian political organizations became explicitly antisemitic. German documents of the period give the impression that Ukrainian ultranationalists were indifferent to the plight of the Jews and would either kill them or help them, whichever was more appropriate for their political goals.

According to Timothy D. Snyder, the Soviet partisans were known for their brutality by retaliating against entire villages suspected of working with the Germans, killing individuals deemed to be collaborators, and provoking the Germans to attack villages. The UPA would later attempt to match that brutality. John-Paul Himka notes that "it is reasonable to assume that the [UPA]--like its Polish counterpart, the Home Army (AK)--liquidated Jewish partisan bands because they were pro-Communist".

By early 1943, the OUN-B had entered into open armed conflict with Nazi Germany. According to Ukrainian historian and former UPA soldier Lev Shankovsky, immediately upon assuming the position of commander of the UPA in August 1943, Roman Shukhevych issued an order banning participation in anti-Jewish activities. No written record of this order, however, has been found. In 1944, the OUN-B formally "rejected racial and ethnic exclusivity". Nevertheless, Jews hiding from the Germans with Poles in Polish villages were often killed by the UPA along with their Polish saviors, although in at least one case, they were spared as the Poles were murdered. Some Jews who fled the ghettos for the forests were killed by members of the UPA.

==== Jewish UPA membership ====
According to Herbert Romerstein, Soviet propaganda complained about Zionist membership in the UPA, and during the persecution of Jews in the early 1950s, they described the alleged connection between Jewish and Ukrainian nationalists. One well-known claimed example of Jewish participation in the UPA was most likely a hoax, according to sources such as Friedman. According to the report, Stella Krenzbach, the daughter of a rabbi and a Zionist, joined the UPA as a nurse and intelligence agent. She is alleged to have written, "I attribute the fact that I am alive today and devoting all the strength of my thirty-eight years to a free Israel only to God and the Ukrainian Insurgent Army. I became a member of the heroic UPA on 7 November 1943. In our group I counted twelve Jews, eight of whom were doctors". Later, Friedman concluded that Krenzbach was a fictional character, as the only evidence for her existence was in an OUN paper. No one knew of such an employee at the Ministry of Foreign Affairs, where she supposedly worked after the war. A Jew, Leiba Dubrovskii, pretended to be Ukrainian.

== Legacy ==
=== Attempts at reconciliation ===
During the following years, the UPA was officially taboo in the Soviet Union, mentioned only as a terrorist organization. Since Ukraine's independence in 1991, there have been heated debates about the possible award of official recognition to former UPA members as legitimate combatants, with the accompanying pensions and benefits due to war veterans. UPA veterans have also striven to hold parades and commemorations of their own, especially in Western Ukraine. This, in turn, led to opposition from Soviet Army veterans and some Ukrainian politicians, particularly from the south and east of the country.

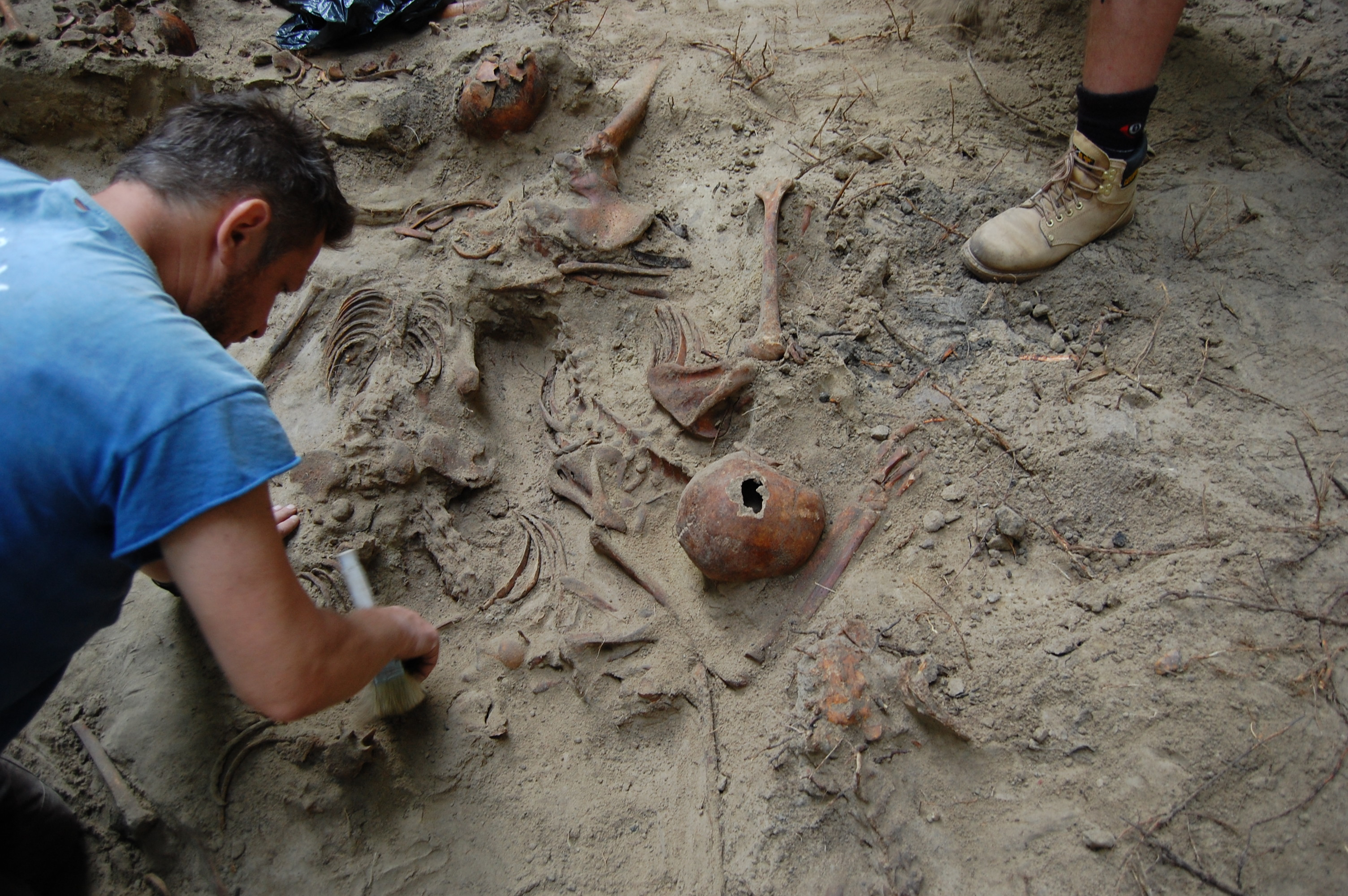
Exhumation of Polish victims, many of whom were identified as children (pictured), at the site of the Gaj massacre committed by UPA, 2013

Attempts to reconcile former Polish Home Army and UPA soldiers have been made by both the Ukrainian and Polish sides. Individual former UPA members have expressed their readiness for a mutual apology. Some of the past soldiers of both organizations have met and asked for forgiveness for their past misdeeds. However, the subject of exhumations remains a contentious issue between the Polish and Ukrainian governments, and in the past, the Ukrainian authorities were accused of trying to cover up the scale of the massacres perpetrated by UPA on the Polish civilian population. Restorations of graves and cemeteries in Poland where fallen UPA soldiers were buried have been agreed to by the Polish side.

=== 2019 official veteran status ===
In late March 2019 former members of the Ukrainian Insurgent Army (and other living former members of Ukrainian irregular nationalist armed groups that were active during World War II and the first decade after the war) were officially granted the status of veterans. This meant that for the first time they could receive veteran benefits, including free public transport, subsidized medical services, annual monetary aid, and public utility discounts (and will enjoy the same social benefits as former Ukrainian soldiers who served in the Soviet Union's Red Army).

There had been several previous attempts to provide former Ukrainian nationalist fighters with official veteran status, especially during the 2005–2009 administration of President Viktor Yushchenko, but all failed. Prior to December 2018, legally only former UPA members who "participated in hostilities against Nazi invaders in occupied Ukraine in 1941–1944, who did not commit crimes against humanity and were rehabilitated" were recognized as war veterans.

=== Monuments for combatants ===
Without waiting for official notice from Kyiv, many regional authorities have already decided to approach the UPA's history on their own. In many western cities and villages monuments, memorials, and plaques to the leaders and troops of the UPA have been erected. In eastern Ukraine's city of Kharkiv, a memorial to the soldiers of the UPA was erected in 1992.

In response, some southern and eastern provinces, although the UPA had not operated in those regions, opened memorials of their own dedicated to the UPA's victims. The first one, "The Shot in the Back", was unveiled by the Communist Party of Ukraine in Simferopol, Crimea in September 2007. In 2008, one was erected in Svatove, Luhansk oblast, and another in Luhansk on 8 May 2010 by the city deputy, Arsen Klinchaev, and the Party of Regions. The unveiling ceremony was attended by Vice Prime Minister Viktor Tikhonov, the leader of the parliamentary faction of the Pro-Russian Party of Regions Oleksandr Yefremov, Russian State Duma deputy Konstantin Zatulin, Luhansk Regional Governor Valerii Holenko, and Luhansk Mayor Serhii Kravchenko.

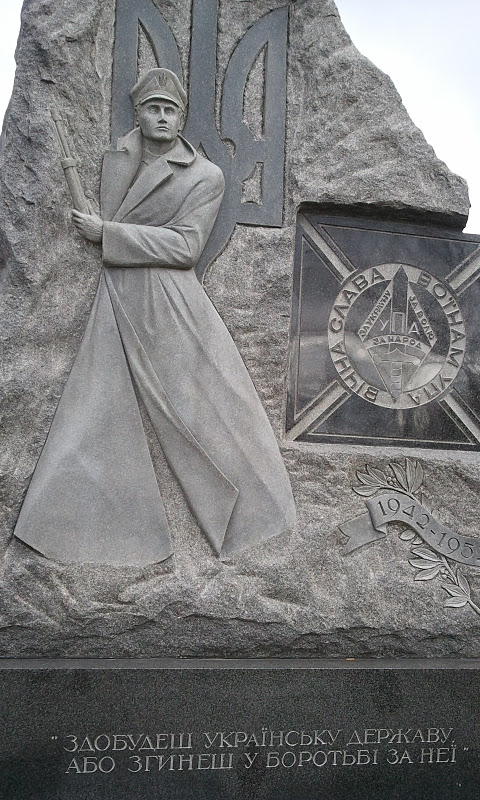
Monument to UPA veterans at St. Volodymyr Cemetery, Oakville, Ontario

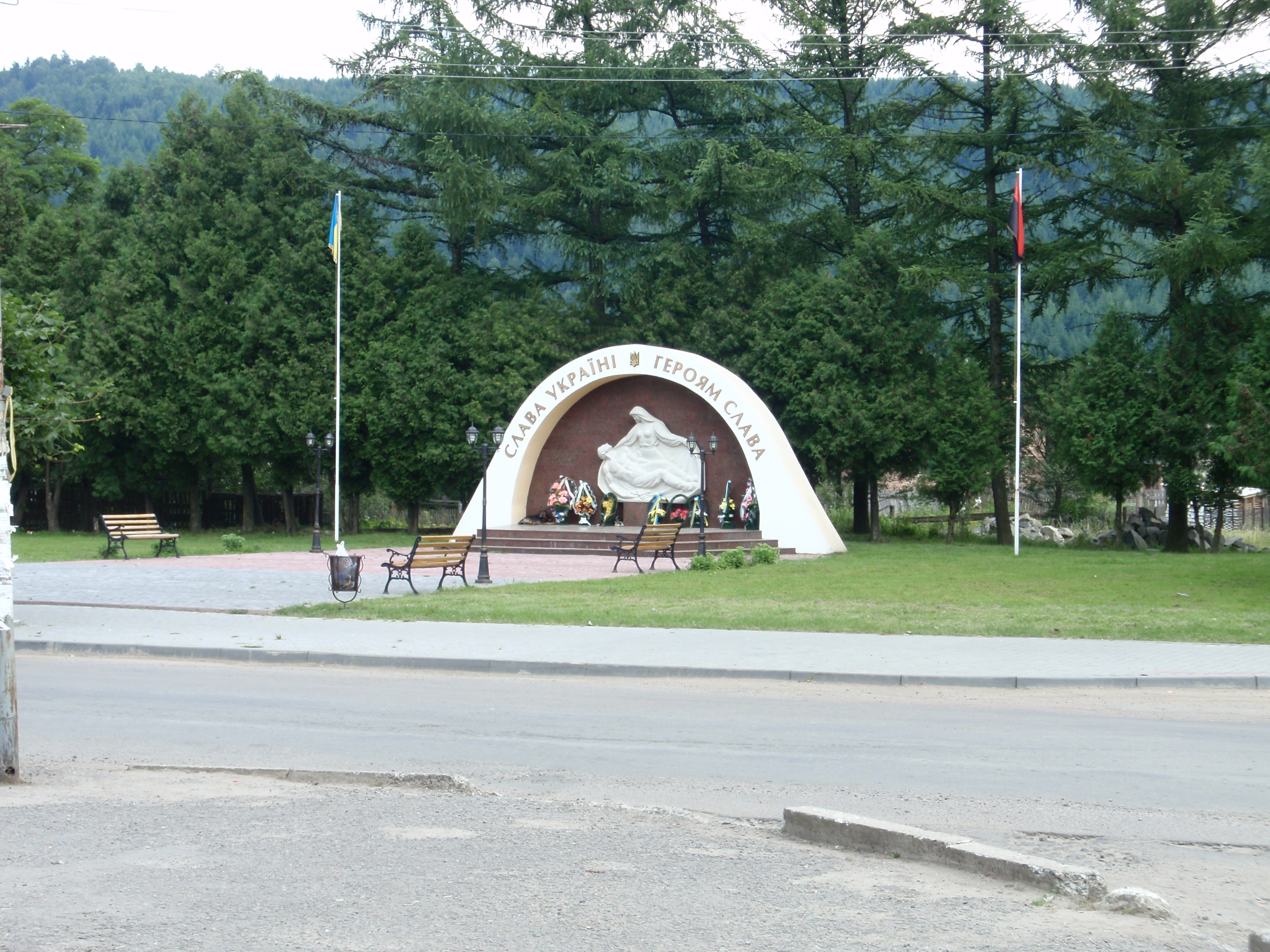
Monument to soldiers of UPA, Skole, Lviv Oblast, Ukraine

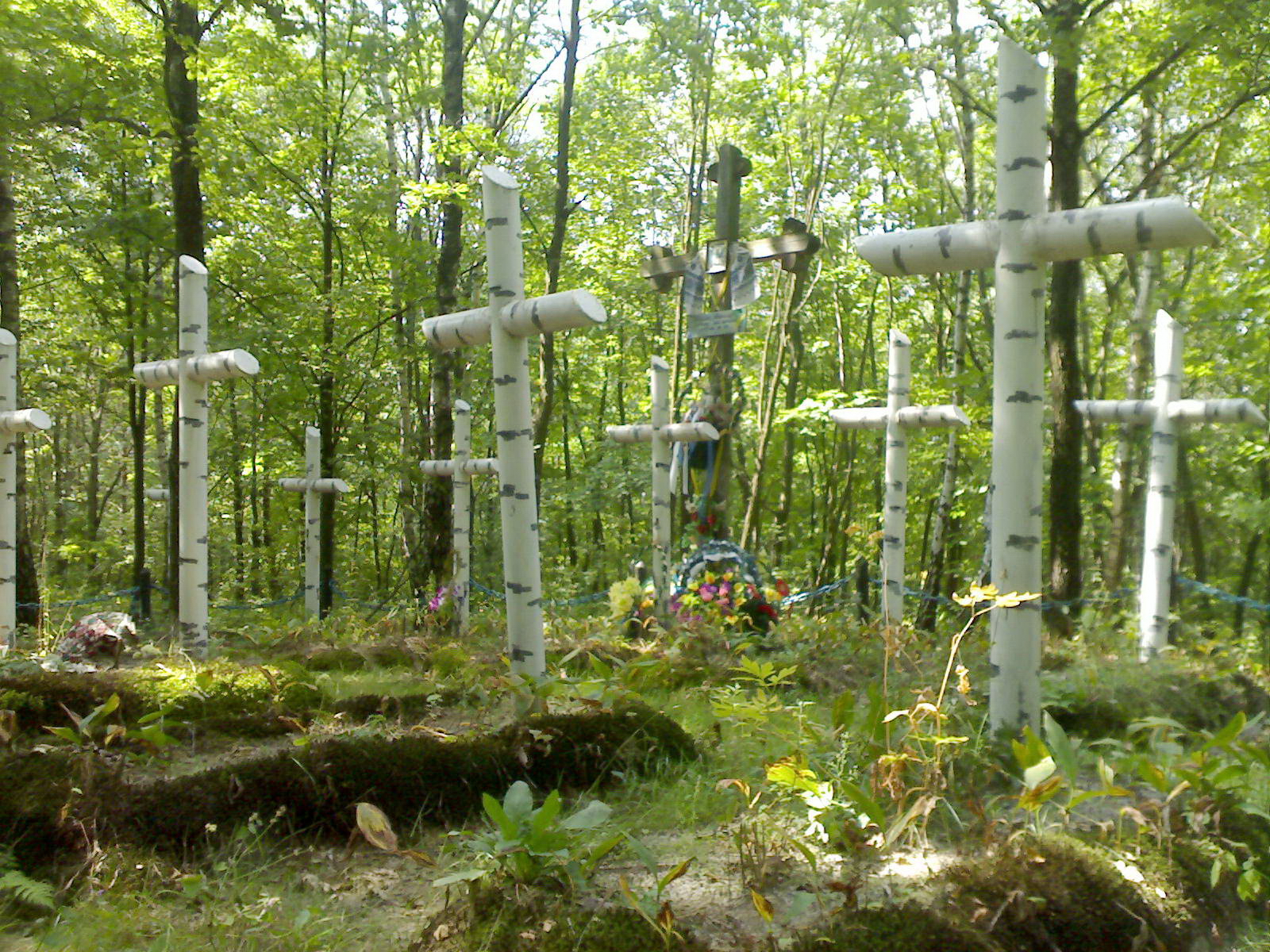
Cemetery of UPA soldiers, Antonivci, Ternopil Oblast, Ukraine

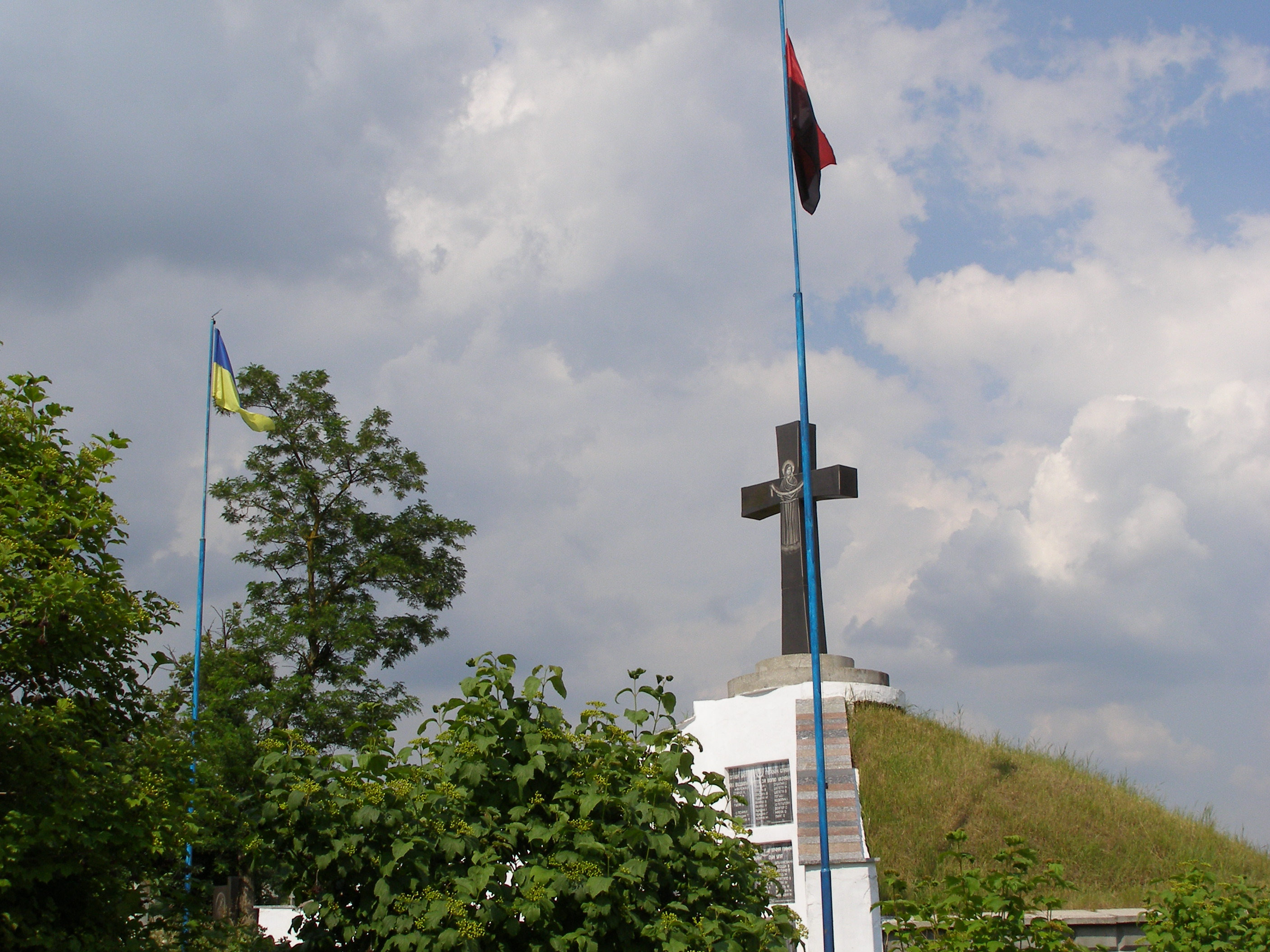
Monument to the soldiers of UPA, Berezhany, Ternopil Oblast, Ukraine

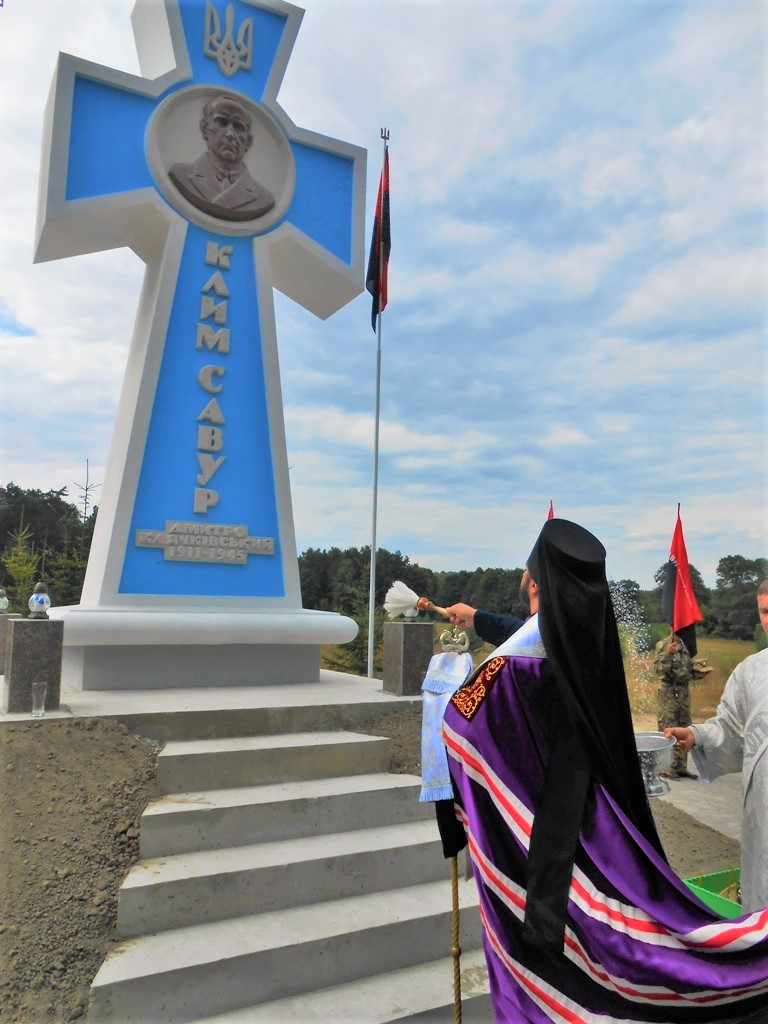
Monument to senior UPA commander Dmytro Klyachkivsky near Orzhiv, Ukraine

Tomb of the Unknown Soldier and other UPA graves in the Ukrainian Orthodox Cemetery in South Bound Brook, New Jersey

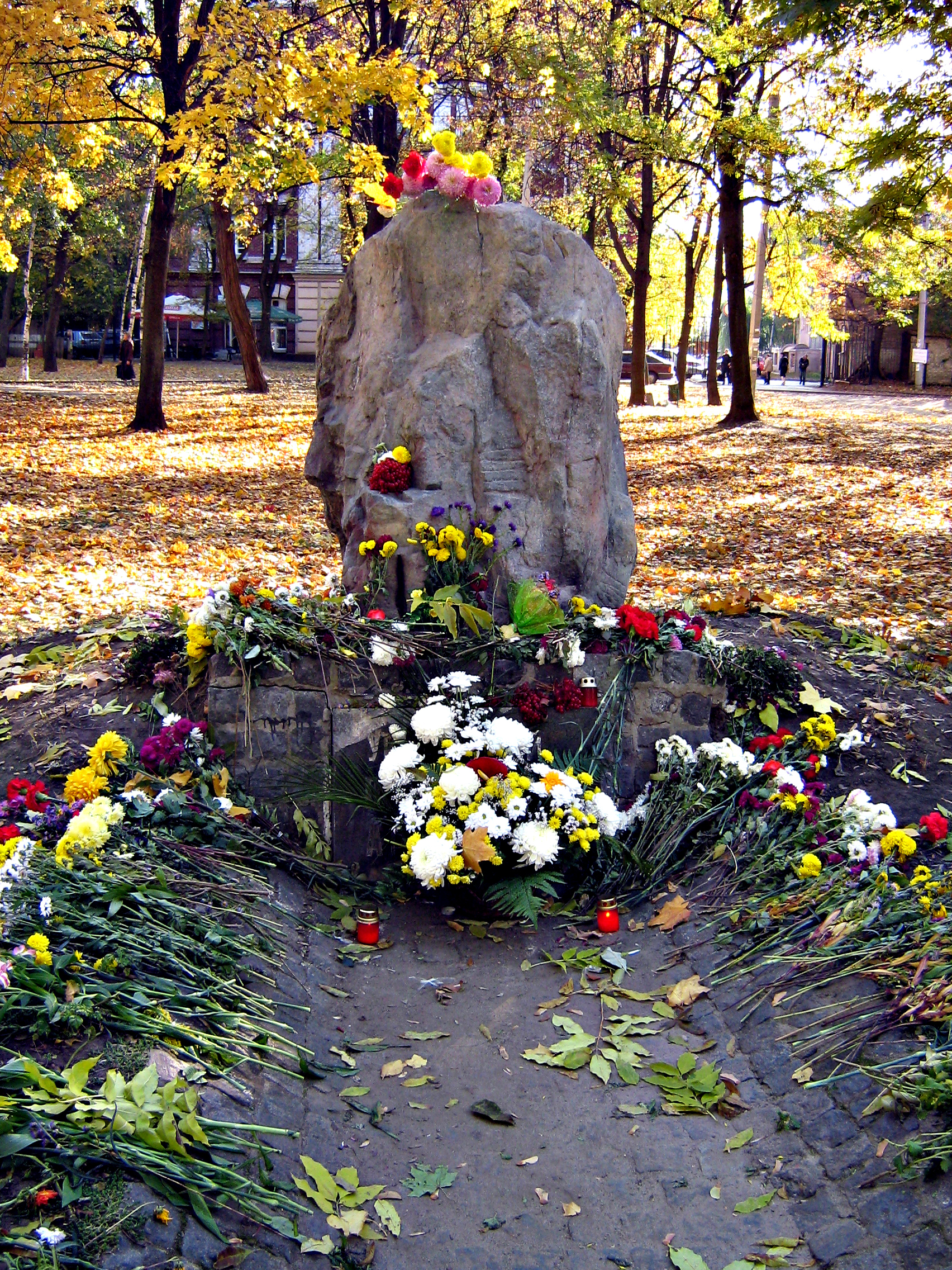
Memorial for UPA soldiers, Kharkiv, Ukraine

=== Commemoration in Ukraine ===
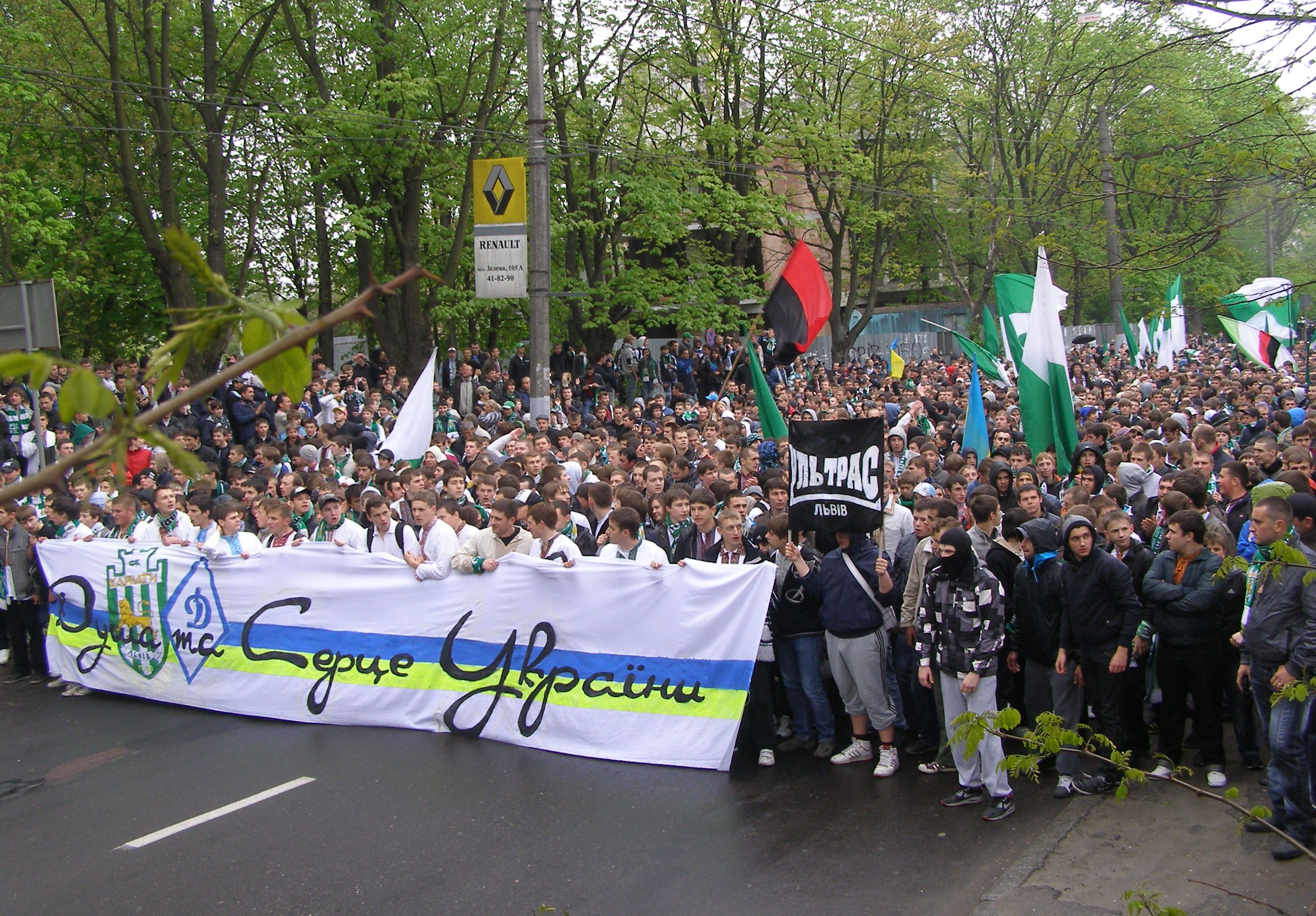
Ultras of FC Karpaty Lviv and FC Dynamo Kyiv wave the UPA flag in May 2011.

According to John Armstrong,

"If one takes into account the duration, geographical extent, and intensity of activity, the UPA very probably is the most important example of forceful resistance to an established Communist regime prior to the decade of fierce Afghan resistance beginning in 1979... the Hungarian revolution of 1956 was, of course, far more important, involving to some degree a population of nine million... however it lasted only a few weeks. In contrast, the more-or-less effective anti-Communist activity of the Ukrainian resistance forces lasted from mid-1944 until 1950."

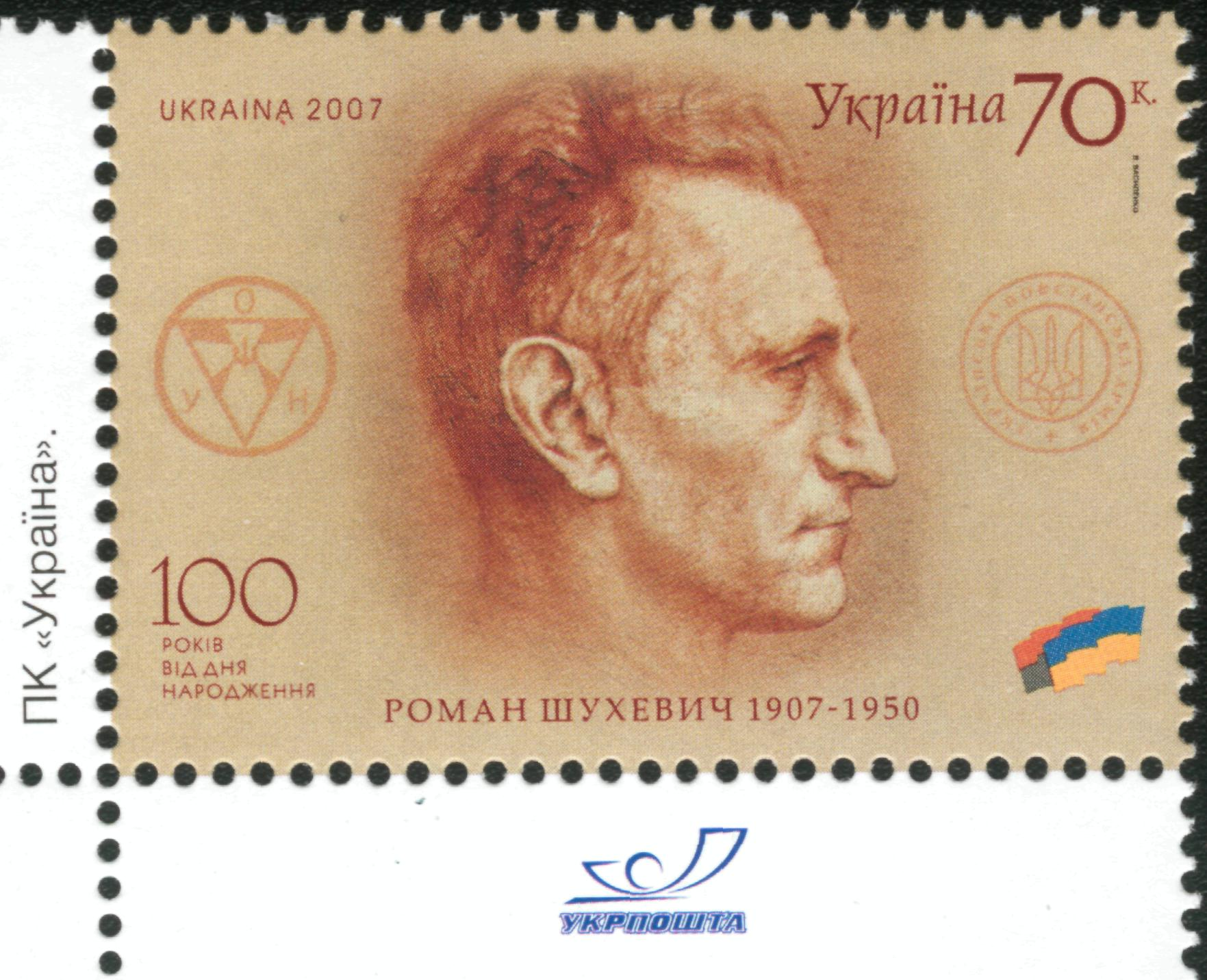
Ukrainian postage stamp honoring Roman Shukhevych on 100th anniversary (2007) of his birth

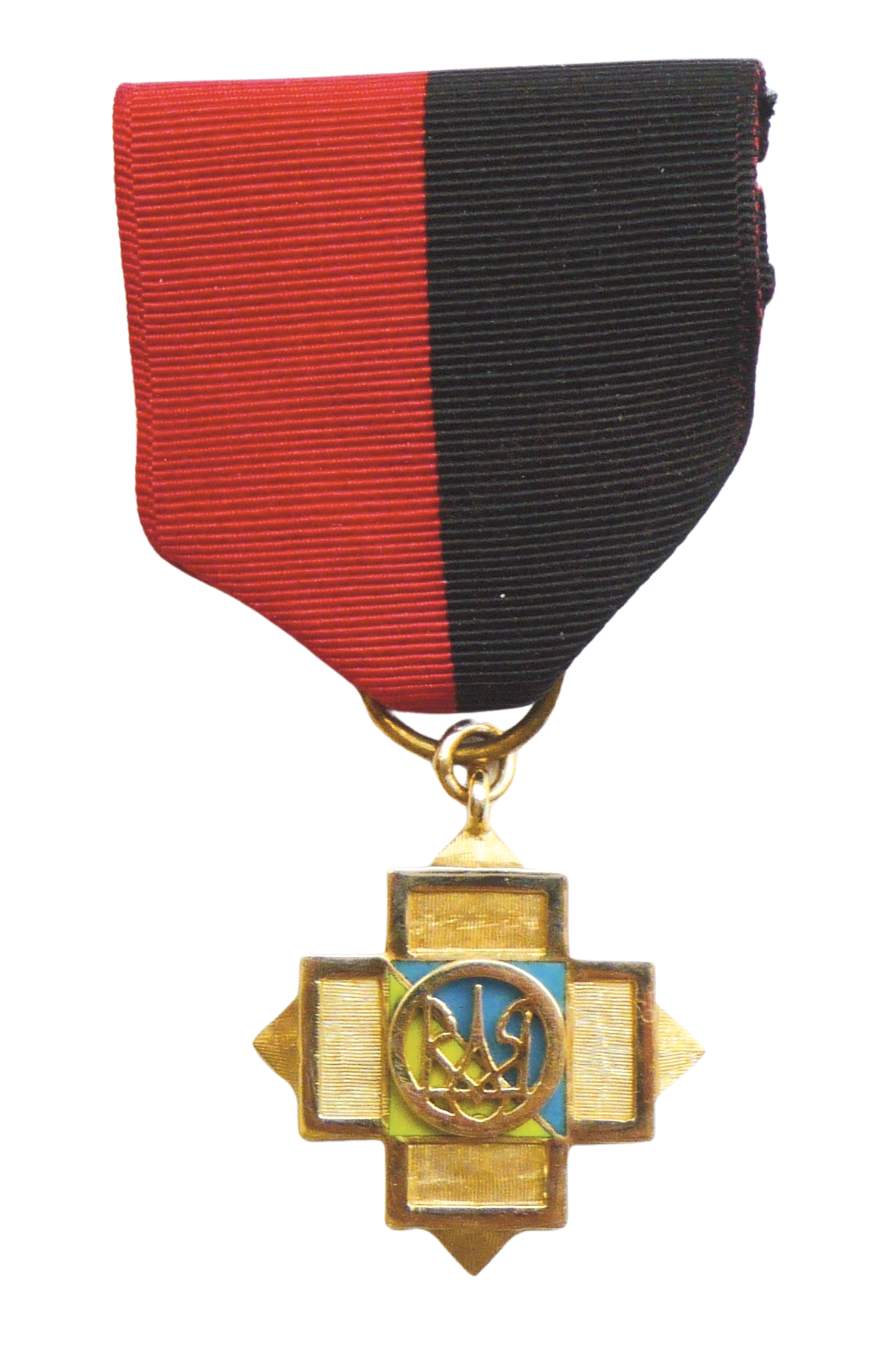
Golden Cross "25th anniversary of UPA" of Albert Hasenbroekx (1967)

Since 2006, the SBU has been actively involved in declassifying documents relating to the operations of Soviet security services and the history of the liberation movement in Ukraine. The SBU Information Centre provides an opportunity for scholars to get acquainted with electronic copies of archive documents. The documents are arranged by topics (1932–1933 Holodomor, OUN/UPA Activities, Repression in Ukraine, Movement of Dissident). In 2007, the Security Service of Ukraine (SBU) set up a special working group to study archive documents of the activity of the Organization of Ukrainian Nationalists (OUN) and the Ukrainian Insurgent Army (UPA) to make public original sources.

On 10 January 2008, Ukrainian President Viktor Yushchenko submitted a draft law "on the official Status of Fighters for Ukraine's Independence from the 1920s to the 1990s". Under the draft, persons who took part in political, guerrilla, underground and combat activities for the freedom and independence of Ukraine from 1920 to 1990 as part of or assisting the Ukrainian Military Organization (UVO), Karpatska Sich, OUN, UPA, and Ukrainian Main Liberation Army would be recognised as war veterans. Since September 2009, Ukrainian schoolchildren take a more extensive course of the history of the Holodomor and the fighters of the OUN and the UPA fighters. Yushchenko took part in the celebration of the 67th anniversary of the UPA and the 65th anniversary of Ukrainian Supreme Liberation Council on 14 October 2009.

On 16 January 2012, the Higher Administrative Court of Ukraine upheld the presidential decree of 28 January 2010 "About recognition of OUN members and soldiers of the Ukrainian Insurgent Army as participants in the struggle for independence of Ukraine" after it was challenged by the leader of the Progressive Socialist Party of Ukraine, Nataliya Vitrenko, recognising the UPA as war combatants. On 10 October 2014, the date of 14 October as Defenders of Ukraine Day was confirmed by Presidential decree, officially granting state sanction to the date of the anniversary of the raising of the Insurgent Army, which has been celebrated in the past by Ukrainian Cossacks as the Feast of the Intercession of the Virgin Mary. The date would be moved to 1 October in 2023 with the move of all Orthodox fixed solemnities to the Revised Julian Calendar, but minor commemorations on the 14th continue as usual it was the date in 1942 wherein the UIA was founded.

On 15 May 2015, Ukrainian President Petro Poroshenko signed a bill into law "On the legal status and commemoration of the fighters for the independence of Ukraine in the 20th century", including Ukrainian Insurgent Army combatants. In June 2017, the Kyiv City Council renamed the city's General Vatutin Avenue into Roman Shukhevych Avenue. According to Russia's RIA Novosti in 2018, in Kyiv, Lviv, Ivano-Frankivsk and Zhytomyr, the UPA flag may be displayed on government buildings "on certain holidays". In December 2018, Poroshenko confirmed the status of veterans and combatants for independence of Ukraine for UPA fighters.

On 5 March 2021, the Ternopil City Council named the largest stadium in the city of Ternopil after Roman Shukhevych as the Roman Shukhevych Ternopil city stadium. On 16 March 2021, the Lviv Oblast Council approved the renaming of their largest stadium after Roman Shukhevych.

On 20 October 2026, local deputies of the Lviv Regional Council supported a resolution to designate 2027 as the Year of the Ukrainian Insurgent Army (UPA) and its commander-in-chief, Roman Shukhevych. Head of polish government Donald Tusk and the minister of defense criticized thes decision harsh. As a reaction Polish city of Przemyśl and the Lublin Voivodeship suspended cooperation with Lviv. Ukrainian foreign ministry called Regional Council's decision counterproductive and distances itself from it.

=== In popular culture ===
The Ukrainian black metal band Drudkh recorded a song entitled Ukrainian Insurgent Army on its 2006 release, Кров у Наших Криницях (Blood in our wells), dedicated to Stepan Bandera. Ukrainian Neo-Nazi black metal band Nokturnal Mortum have a song titled "Hailed Be the Heroes" (Слава героям) on the Weltanschauung/Мировоззрение album which contains lyrics pertaining to World War II and Western Ukraine (Galicia), and its title, Slava Heroyam, is a traditional UPA salute.

Cross of Combat Merit

Two Czech films by František Vláčil, Shadows of the Hot Summer (Stíny horkého léta, 1977) and The Little Shepherd Boy from the Valley (Pasáček z doliny, 1983) are set in 1947, and feature UPA guerrillas in significant supporting roles. The first film resembles Sam Peckinpah's Straw Dogs (1971), in that it is about a farmer whose family is taken hostage by five UPA guerrillas, and he has to resort to his own ingenuity, plus reserves of violence that he never knew he possessed, to defeat them. In the second, the shepherd boy (actually a cowherd) imagines that a group of UPA guerrillas is made up of fairytale characters of his grandfather's stories, and that their leader is the Goblin King.

Also films such as Neskorenyi ("The Undefeated"), Zalizna Sotnia ("The Company of Heroes") and Atentat ("Assassination. An Autumn Murder in Munich") feature more description about the role of the UPA on their terrain. The Undefeated is about the life of Roman Shukhevych and the hunt for him by both German and Soviet forces, The Company of Heroes shows how UPA soldiers had everyday life as they fight against Armia Krajowa, Assassination is about the life of Stepan Bandera and how KGB agents murdered him.

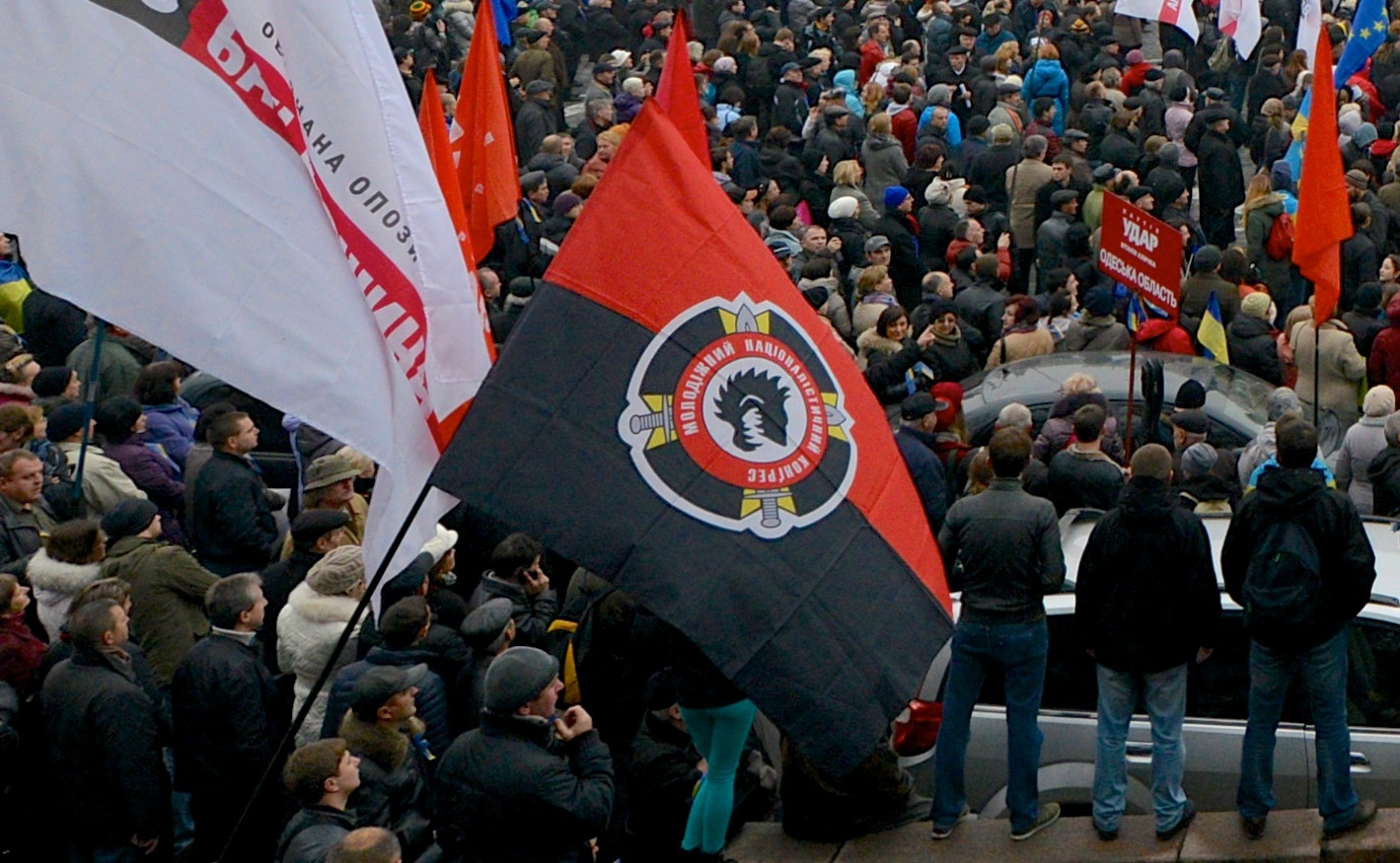
The rally on European Square in Kyiv, 24 November 2013

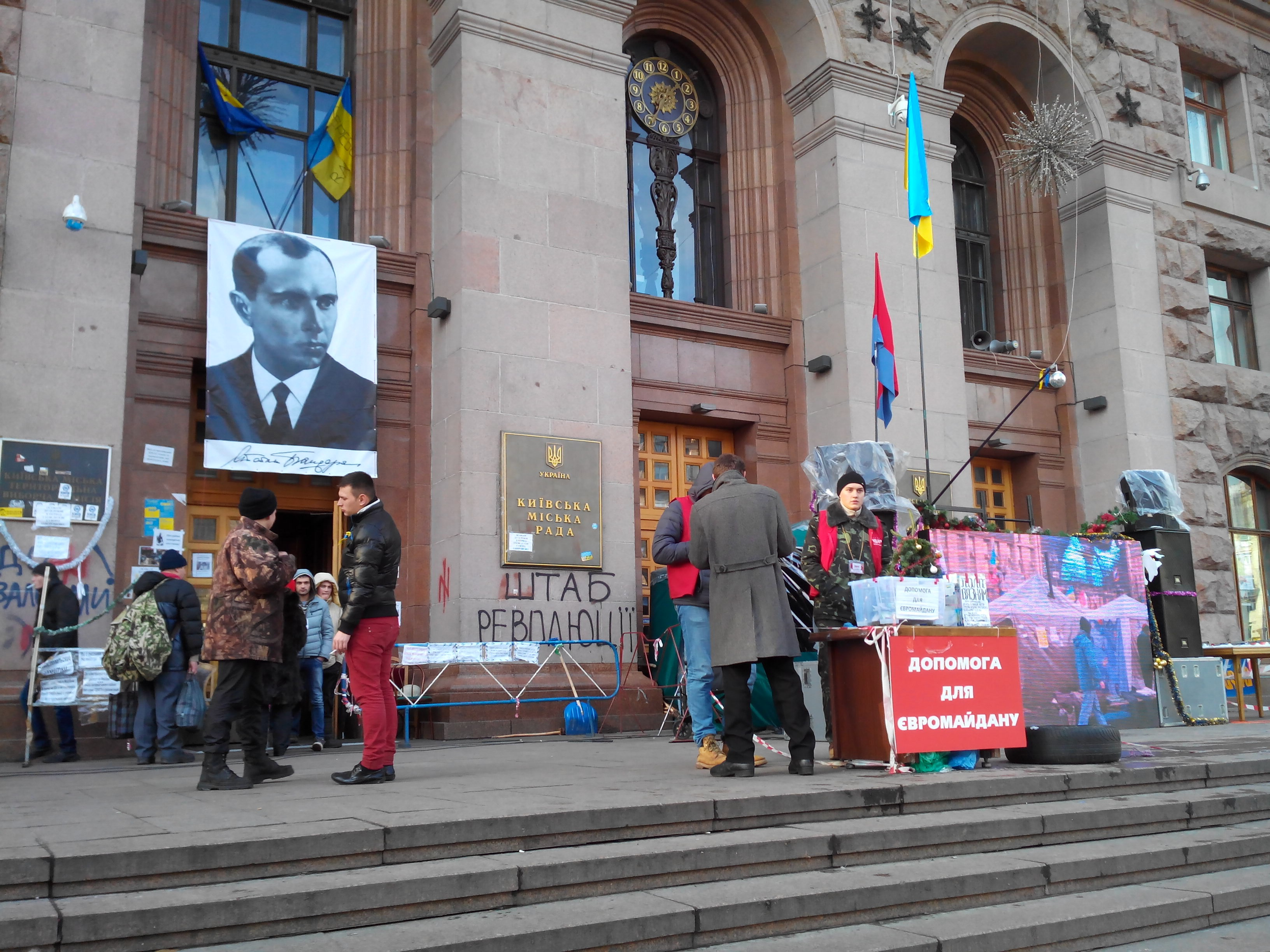
Headquarters of the Euromaidan. At the front entrance there is a portrait of Stepan Bandera, a 20th-century Ukrainian nationalist.

The red-and-black battle flag of the Ukrainian Insurgent Army was a popular symbol among Euromaidan protesters, and the wartime insurgents have acted as a large inspiration for them. Serhy Yekelchyk of the University of Victoria says the use of UPA imagery and slogans was more of a potent symbol of protest against the current government and Russia rather than adulation for the insurgents themselves, explaining "The reason for the sudden prominence of [UPA symbolism] in Kiev is that it is the strongest possible expression of protest against the pro-Russian orientation of the current government."

==== Films ====
- 1951 – Akce B (Czechoslovakia)
- 1961 – The Artillery Sergeant Kalen (Polish People's Republic)
- 1962 – Zerwany most (Polish People's Republic)
- 1968 – Annychka (USSR)
- 1970 – The White Bird Marked with Black (USSR)
- 1976 – The Troubled Month of Veresen (USSR)
- 1977 – Shadows of the Hot Summer (Czechoslovakia)
- 1983 – The Little Shepherd Boy from the Valley (Czechoslovakia)
- 1991 – The Last Bunker (Ukraine)
- 1991 – Carpathian Gold (Ukraine)
- 1992 – Cherry Nights (Ukraine)
- 1993 – Memories about UPA (Ukraine)
- 1994 – Goodbye, Girl (Ukraine)
- 1995 – Assassination. An Autumn Murder in Munich (Ukraine)
- 1995 – Executed Dawns (Ukraine)
- 2000 – The Undefeated (Ukraine)
- 2004 – One – the soldier in the field (Ukraine)
- 2004 – The Company of Heroes (Ukraine)
- 2004 – Between Hitler and Stalin (Canada)
- 2006 – Sobor on the Blood (Ukraine)
- 2006 – OUN – UPA war on two fronts (Ukraine)
- 2006 – Freedom or death! (Ukraine)
- 2007 – UPA. Third Force (Ukraine)
- 2010 – We are from the Future 2 (Russia)
- 2010 – Banderovci (Czech Republic)
- 2012 – Security Service of OUN. "Closed Doors" (Ukraine)
- 2016 – Wołyń (Poland)

==== Fiction ====
- Fire Poles (Вогненні стовпи) by Roman Ivanchuk, 2006.

==== Songs ====
The most obvious characteristic of the insurgent songs genre is the theme of rising up against occupying powers, enslavement and tyranny. Insurgent songs express an open call to battle and to revenge against the enemies of Ukraine, as well as love for the country and devotion to her revolutionary leaders (Bandera, Chuprynka and others). UPA actions, heroic deeds of individual soldiers, the hard underground life, longing for one's girl, family or boy are also important subject of this genre.

- Taras Zhytynsky "To sons of UPA"
- Tartak "Not saying to anybody"
- Folk song "To the source of Dniester"
- Drudkh – "Ukrainian Insurgent Army"

== See also ==
- Banderite
- Defenders Day (Ukraine)
- Galicia (Eastern Europe)
- List of Nazi monuments in Canada
- Zakerzonia
- Ukrainian liberation movement (1920–1950)
