= Kolky =

Kolky (Ukrainian: Колки) may refer to the following places in Ukraine:

- Kolky, urban-type settlement in Manevychi Raion, Volyn Oblast
- Kolky, village in Teofipol Raion, Khmelnytskyi Oblast
- Kolky, village in Dubrovytsia Raion, Rivne Oblast
