= People's Commissariat for Internal Affairs units dressed as Ukrainian Insurgent Army fighters =

Historical issue

During the Soviet struggle to establish control over Western Ukraine, NKVD units dressed as UPA fighters committed atrocities in order to demoralize the civilian population, and to turn the people against nationalist groups.

Some of the NKVD units consisted of former UPA members. From the November 1944 NKVD starting usage of so-called “special groups” composed from voluntarily surrendered OUN and UPA members and, sometimes, 1 of NKVD communication officer.

Their tasks were:

1. capturing or extermination of OUN-UPA head staff and/or headquarters;
2. extermination of small UPA units and local detachment of OUN and SB (OUN Security Service);
3. localization of UPA units for NKVD service and troops action;
4. Extermination of OUN-UPA communication network;
5. data collection before large scale NKVD operations;
6. Localization and destruction of OUN-UPA bunkers-stockpiles.

As of June 20, 1945 such groups were numbered 156 with 1783 of personnel. Since summer 1945 the fact of such group existence also became known for OUN/UPA, thus the NKVD stopped new groups creation and rejoin the existing to larger size formation (initially they can have from 3 to 50 persons depending on task). In 1946-47 such group was formed by MGB. According to report from 15 February 1949 No. 4/001345 from Military Judge of Ukrainian area to Khrushchev, some special groups committed atrocities against the civil population in order to falsify their links with OUN/UPA and summon faked OUN/UPA detachments, sometimes even they exterminate Soviet agents from other region or authority . In many cases such “crimes against Soviet law” were hidden by local regional MGB staff, nevertheless some of such “groups” were prosecuted by Military Court.

In 2008, the Security Service of Ukraine (SBU) has published information about the actions of special groups from the NKVD posing as fighters of the Ukrainian Insurgent Army (UPA) and the Organization of Ukrainian Nationalists (OUN) in the western regions of the Ukrainian Soviet Socialist Republic during the 1944-1954 period. About 150 such special groups consisting of 1,800 people operated until 1954.

== See also ==
- The NKVD special groups
- The Ukrainian Insurgent Army
