= Fire Poles =

Novel by Roman Ivanchuk

Fire Poles (Ukrainian: “Вогненні стовпи”) usually translated to imply “Fire Poles” or “Fire Pillars” is a historical Ukrainian novel in four volumes written by Roman Ivanchuk. It was published by the Chronicle publishing house in 2006 and then later republished by Folio publishing house in Kharkiv in 2011 and 2019.

In the novel, Ivanchuk make an attempt to truthfully take readers on a journey of one of the toughest and most controversial times of the country’s past: the book is the first Ukrainian artwork on the history of the Ukrainian Insurgent Army” This novel tells of a history of struggle and tragedy of a people, their loyalty and betrayal (Vohenenni Post). It tells of honor and dishonor and a tale of Roman’s native land and the elements that kept and upheld the spirit of the nation. The novel tells about Shinkaruk's family, about the participation of his children in the liberation contests of Ukraine. The events unfold on the territory of the Carpathian Mountains. Along with fictional characters, real historical figures appear.

Sections of the novel

- Книга перша — ПЕРЕДЛУННЯ. Прелюд / Volume One - Peredlunnia. Prelude
- Книга друга — РЕВ ОЛЕНІВ НАРОЗВИДНІ. Леґенда / Volume Two - Rev Oleniv Narozvydni. Legends
- Книга третя — ВОГНЕННІ СТОВПИ. Притча / Book Three - Pillar Of Fire. Parable
- Книга четверта — КОСМАЦЬКИЙ ҐЕРДАН. Реквієм / Book Four - Kosmatskyi Gerdan. Requiem
