= Kolky, Rivne Oblast =

Kolky Колки
- Village
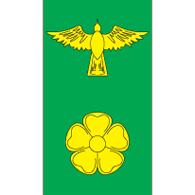
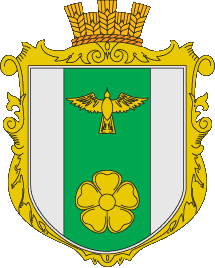
- Flag Coat of arms

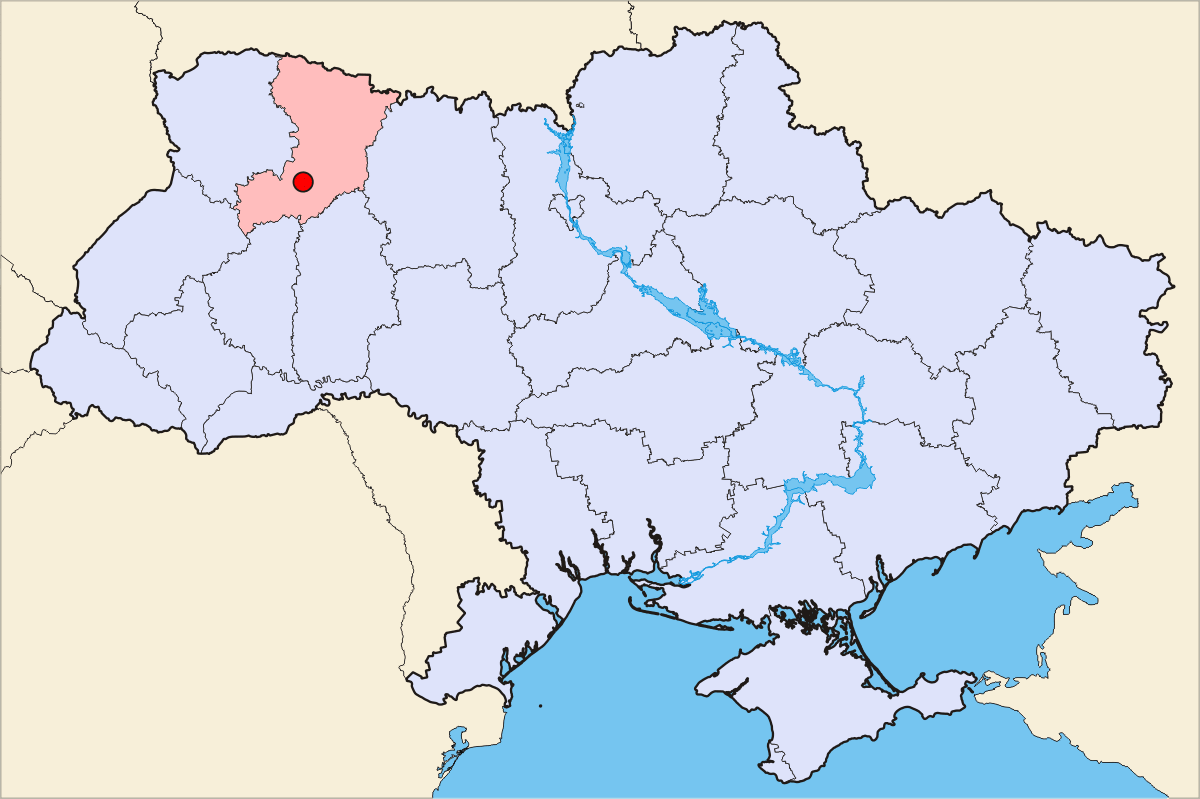
- Location within the Rivne Oblast
- Coordinates: 51°35′22″N 26°37′17″E
- Country: Ukraine
- Oblast: Rivne Oblast
- Raion: Sarny Raion
- Silska Rada: Kolky Silska Rada
- Founded: 1576

Area
  - Total: 1.24 km^{2} (0.48 sq mi)
- Elevation: 144 m (472 ft)

Population (01.01.2025)
  - Total: ▼1,685
  - Density: 1,543/km^{2} (4,000/sq mi)
- Time zone: UTC+2 (EET)
  - Summer (DST): UTC+3 (EEST)
- Postal index: 34144
- Area code: +380 3658

Kolky (Ukrainian: Колки) is a village in Sarny Raion, Rivne Oblast, Ukraine, but was formerly administered within Dubrovytsia Raion. As of the year 2001, the community had 1913 residents. The village's postal code is 34144, and the KOATUU code is 5621883401.
