= 2014 pro-Russian unrest in Ukraine =

- Part of the Russo-Ukrainian War
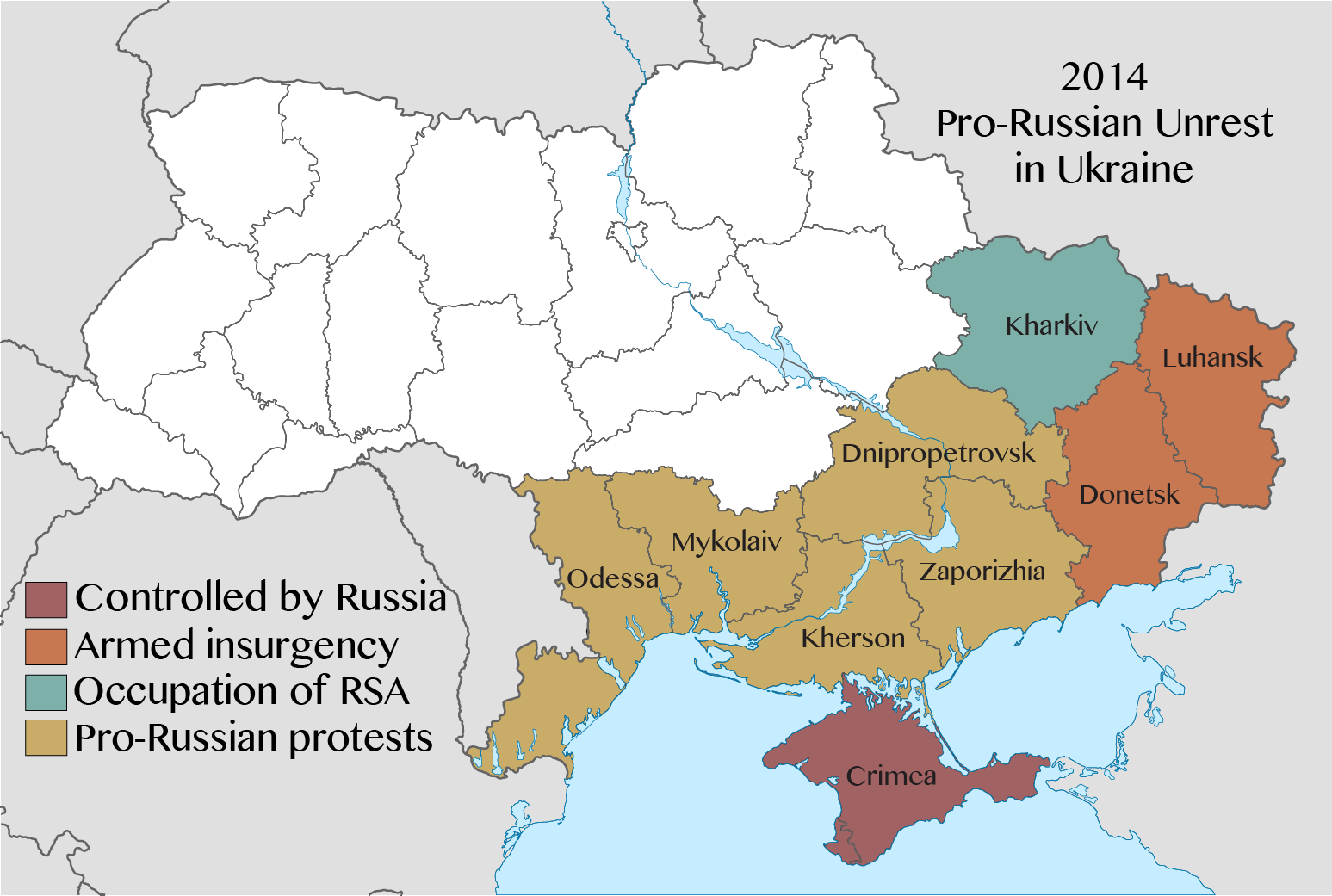
- Map of disturbances by region, indicating its peak severity
- Date: 23 February – 2 May 2014 (2 months, 1 week and 2 days)
- Location: Crimea, Donetsk, Luhansk, Kharkiv and Odesa
- Caused by: Russia's support of separatism, opposition to Euromaidan, success of the Revolution of Dignity and the pro-European outlook of the new government
- Goals: Union with Russia; Federalization; Referendums on status for Eastern Ukraine and Southern Ukraine; Establishment of Russian as a second official language in Ukraine; Creation of Donetsk, Odesa, Kharkiv and Luhansk People's Republics
- Methods: Protests; Riots; Armed insurgency; Occupation of administrative buildings; Covert operations by the Russian Federation
- Result: Escalation into the war in Donbas; 48 people killed during the clashes in Odesa; Establishment of Donetsk and Luhansk People's Republics

From the end of February 2014, in the aftermath of the Euromaidan and the Revolution of Dignity, which resulted in the ousting of Russian-leaning Ukrainian president Viktor Yanukovych, demonstrations by Russian-backed, pro-Russian, and anti-government groups (as well as pro-government demonstrations) took place in Crimea, Donetsk, Luhansk, Kharkiv, and Odesa. The unrest, which was supported by the Russian military and intelligence services, belongs to the early stages of the Russo-Ukrainian war.

During its first phase in February–March 2014, the Ukrainian territory of Crimea was invaded and subsequently annexed by Russia following an internationally unrecognized referendum, with the United Nations General Assembly voting in favor of Ukraine's territorial integrity. Concurrently, protests by anti-Maidan and pro-Russian groups took place across other parts of eastern and southern Ukraine. Local separatists, some directed and financed by the Russian security services, took advantage of the situation and occupied government buildings in Donetsk, Luhansk, and Kharkiv oblasts in early March 2014. The Ukrainian government was able to quickly quell this unrest and removed the separatists by 10 March.

Eventually, Kharkiv, Odesa, and most parts of Donbas, including Mariupol, remained under Ukrainian government control. The Russia-controlled DPR and LPR were formed and took control of Donetsk and Luhansk. In the second phase from April 2014, armed Russian-backed groups seized government buildings across Donetsk and Luhansk oblasts, together known as the Donbas, and launched a separatist insurgency in the region. To suppress this insurgency, the Ukrainian government began what it called an "Anti-Terrorist Operation" (ATO), sending in the armed forces to quell the unrest. Although dozens of dominantly pro-Russian protesters were killed, the unrest in Kharkiv and Odesa oblasts did not escalate into a full-scale armed conflict. Order was restored in these regions with the cooperation of the local civil authorities, though pro-Russian disturbances, such as bombings, continued throughout the year.

== Background ==
After the 2004 Orange Revolution, Russia launched a decade-long effort to restore its political influence in Ukraine by playing on existing domestic fault lines and undermining the central government.

Despite a crackdown on political opponents in 2011–12 (including the arrest and imprisonment of two popular pro-European leaders and including a tightening of personal freedoms), the Verkhovna Rada (Ukrainian parliament) agreed in early 2013 to work towards fulfilling the requirements for joining the European Union, including legislative reform, protecting human rights, and releasing political prisoners. In response, Russia started pressuring Ukraine in August 2013 by applying customs regulations on imports from the country, which culminated on 14 August 2013 with the Russian Custom Service halting goods coming from Ukraine. This prompted politicians and others to view the move as the start of a trade war against Ukraine to prevent Ukraine from signing a trade agreement with the European Union.

When president Viktor Yanukovych refused to sign an association agreement with the European Union on 21 November 2013, a protest movement dubbed Euromaidan soon developed into the largest democratic mass movement in Europe since 1989, culminating in the Revolution of Dignity, which removed Yanukovych from power following a majority vote in the Verkhovna Rada and led to the dismissal of his government.

Some people in largely Russophone Donbas, the traditional base of support for Yanukovych and his Party of the Regions, did not approve of the revolution, expressing their support for Russia instead. Historian William Jay Risch notes the spread of rumors aimed against the new Ukrainian government spread on TV and social media by local elites and Russian state media in Donbas. Russia actively supported the separatism in Ukraine, including using its high-level actors, such as Kremlin advisers Vladislav Surkov and Sergey Glazyev, who organized some of the pro-Russian protests.

The attendees of pro-Russian protests included Russian citizens from across the border who came to support the efforts of pro-Russian activists in Ukraine. Donetsk Oblast governor Serhiy Taruta said that rallies in Donetsk included ex-convicts and others who traveled from Crimea. Ukraine's police and border guards denied entry to more than 8,200 Russians between 4 and 25 March 2014. On 27 March 2014, National Security and Defence Council Secretary Andriy Parubiy said that between 500 and 700 Russians were being denied entry daily.

=== Public opinion in Ukraine ===
A poll conducted by Kyiv International Institute of Sociology (KIIS) from 8–18 February 2014 assessed support for union with Russia throughout Ukraine. It found that, overall, 12% of those polled preferred unification with Russia. 68.0% said that Ukraine should remain independent and maintain friendly relations with Russia.

Support for a union between Russia and Ukraine was found to be much higher in certain oblasts: 41.0% in Crimea; 33.2% in Donetsk Oblast; 24.1% in Luhansk Oblast; 24.0% in Odesa Oblast; 16.7% in Zaporizhzhia Oblast; 15.1% in Kharkiv Oblast; and 13.8% in Dnipropetrovsk Oblast.

Another Kyiv International Institute of Sociology poll the following April, of all of the oblasts of southern and eastern Ukraine except Crimea (which had already been annexed by Russia by that point), found majority opposition to secession from Ukraine and annexation by Russia in all of these oblasts—albeit only a slight majority in opposition to this in the Donbas (Donetsk and Luhansk Oblasts). Opposition to secession from Ukraine and annexation by Russia (the combined percentage for the people opting for the options of "Rather, no" and "Certainly, no, I don't") had these percentages in various southern and eastern Ukrainian oblasts: 51.9% in Luhansk Oblast; 52.2% in Donetsk Oblast; 65.6% in Kharkiv Oblast; 78.8% in Odesa Oblast; 81.5% in Zaporizhzhia Oblast; 84.1% in Dnipropetrovsk Oblast; 84.6% in Kherson Oblast; 85.4% Mykolaiv Oblast.

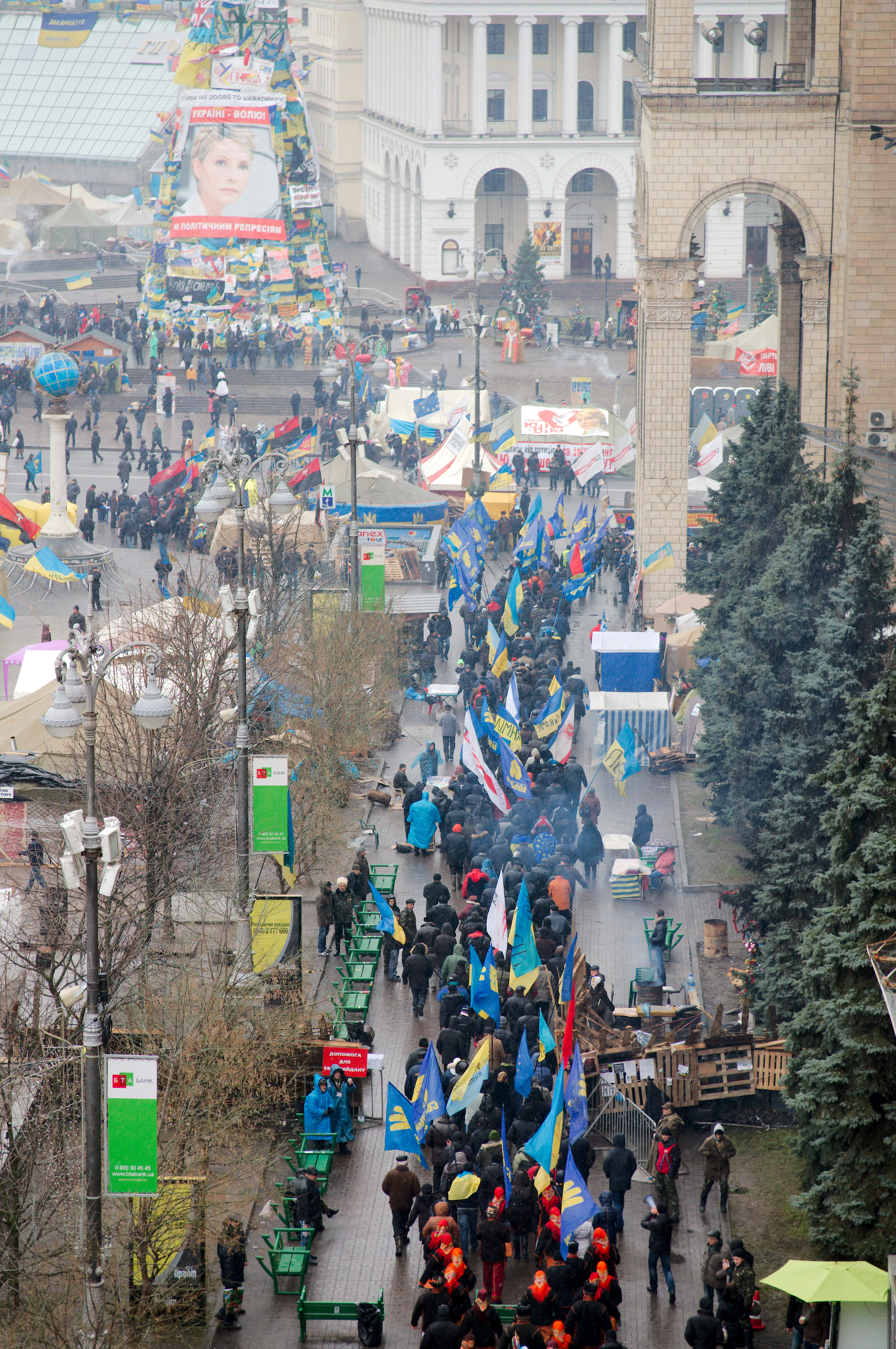
Euromaidan demonstration in Kyiv, January 2014

In an opinion poll conducted from 14 to 26 March by the International Republican Institute, 26–27% of those polled in southern and eastern Ukraine viewed the Euromaidan protests as a coup d'état. Only 5% of respondents in eastern Ukraine felt that Russian-speakers were 'definitely' under pressure or threat. 13% of respondents in southern Ukraine and 22% in eastern Ukraine viewed Russia's actions in Crimea as protecting Russian-speaking citizens of Ukraine, with 37% and 30% viewing them as invasion and occupation, respectively. In the poll, 22% of those in southern Ukraine and 26% of those in eastern Ukraine supported the idea of federalization for the country; 69% of southerners and 53% of easterners supported Ukraine remaining as a unitary state; and only 2% of southerners and 4% of easterners supported separatism. 59% of those polled in eastern Ukraine would have liked to join the Russian-led customs union, while only 22% were in favour of joining the European Union. 37% of southerners preferred to join this customs union, while 29% were in favour of joining the EU. 90% of those polled in western Ukraine wanted to enter an economic union with the EU, while only 4% favoured the customs union led by Russia. Among all the Ukrainians polled overall, 34% favoured joining the North Atlantic Treaty Organization, while 44% were against joining it. In eastern Ukraine and southern Ukraine, only 14% and 11% of the respondents, respectively, favour joining NATO, while 67% and 52% oppose joining it. 72% of people polled in eastern Ukraine thought that the country was going in the wrong direction, compared with only 36% in western Ukraine.

A poll conducted by the Donetsk Institute of Social Research and Policy Analysis analysed the identities of Donetsk inhabitants. While support for separatism was low, just over a third of polled Donetsk inhabitants identified themselves as "citizens of Ukraine". More preferred were "Russian-speaking residents of Ukraine" or "residents of Donbas". The same poll determined that 66% of Donetsk residents that were polled supported remaining in a unified Ukraine, while 18.2% supported joining Russia, and 4.7% supported independence. A second poll conducted from 26 to 29 March showed that 77% of residents condemned the takeover of administrative buildings, while 16% supported such actions. Furthermore, 40.8% of Donetsk citizens supported rallies for Ukraine's unity, while 26.5% supported pro-Russian rallies.

In another research poll conducted 8–16 April by KIIS, a vast majority disapproved of the seizure of administrative buildings by protesters. 45% of those polled in the south and east of Ukraine considered acting President Oleksandr Turchynov to be legitimate, while over 50% not. Most of those polled in the south and east of Ukraine believed that the disarmament and disbandment of illegal radical groups is crucial to preserving national unity. 19.1% of those polled in the south and east of Ukraine believed that Ukraine should be an independent state; 45.2% were for an independent state but with decentralization of the power to the regions, but most felt Russia and Ukraine should share open borders without visa restrictions; 8.4% were in favour of Ukraine and Russia uniting into a single state. 15.4% said they favoured secession of their region to join the Russian Federation, and 24.8% favoured Ukraine becoming a federation. Most of those polled said they found nothing attractive about Russia, but those who did did so for economic, and not cultural reasons. Those polled in southern and eastern Ukraine were generally split on the legitimacy of the present government and parliament, but a majority in all regions agreed that deposed president Viktor Yanukovych was not the legal president of the country. In all regions but the Donbas, pro-Euromaidan oligarch Petro Poroshenko dominated preliminary election polls.

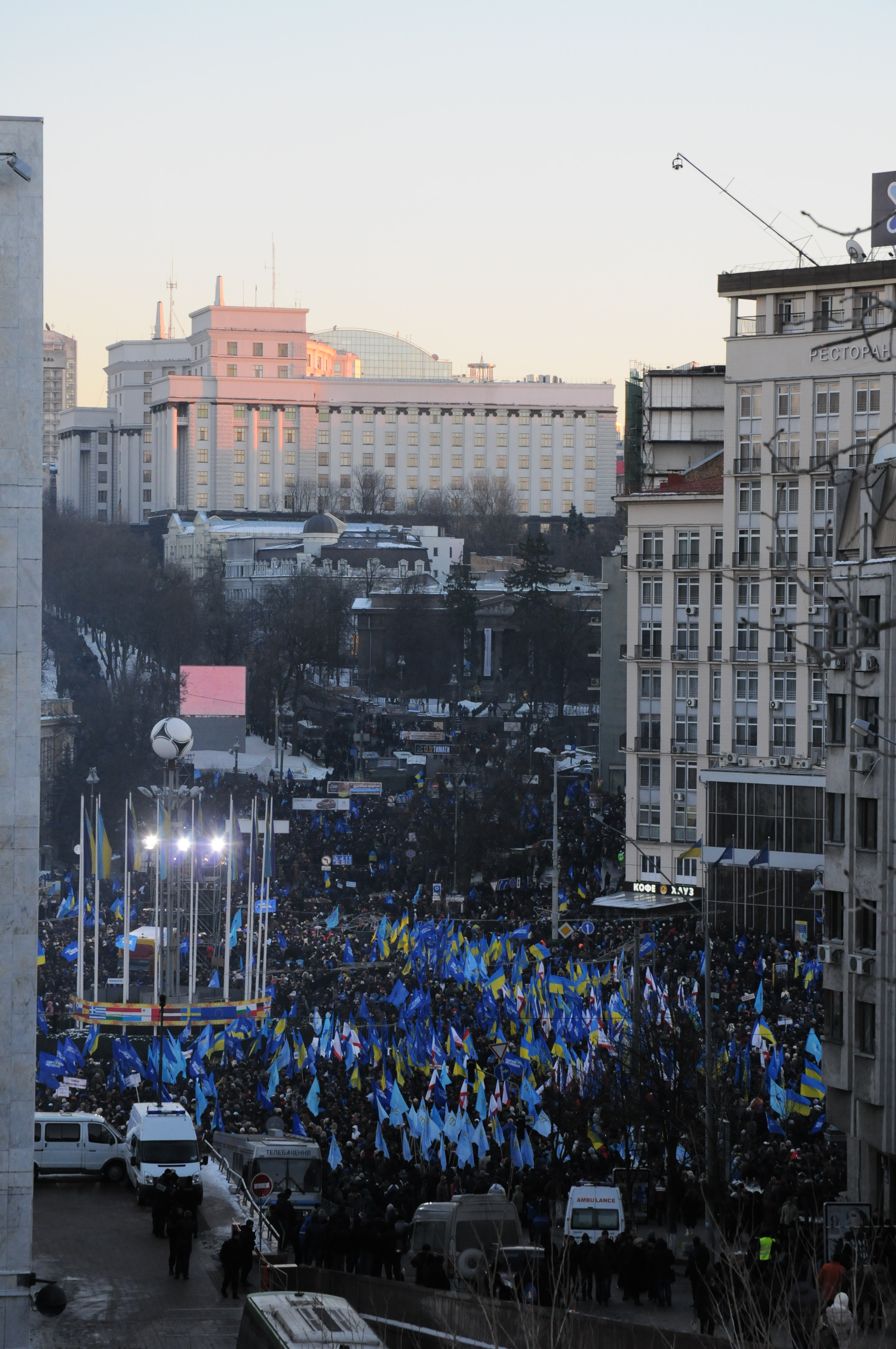
Anti-Maidan in Kyiv, 14 December 2013

A comprehensive poll released on 8 May by the Pew Research Center surveyed opinions in Ukraine on the subject of the unrest. The poll was taken after the annexation of Crimea, but prior to the clashes in Odesa on 2 May. 93% of Westerners and 70% of Easterners polled said that they wanted Ukraine to remain united. Despite international criticism of the 16 March referendum on Crimean status, 91% of the Crimeans polled thought that the vote was free and fair, and 88% said that the Ukrainian government should accept the results.

=== Anti-Maidan ===
During the Euromaidan Revolution, there were widespread reports that pro-Yanukovych and pro-Russian anti-Maidan protesters were paid for their support. Oleksiy Haran, a political scientist at Kyiv Mohyla Academy in Kyiv, stated that people at anti-Maidan are only interested in money. The government uses these hirelings to provoke resistance. They won't be sacrificing anything." Russian leader of the extremist Eurasian Youth Union Oleg Bakhtiyarov was arrested for, in part, recruiting rioters for US$500 each to assist in the storming of government buildings. On 13 April, the Internal Affairs Ministry stated that recruiters were found to be paying $500 to take part in the attacks and 500 UAH (roughly $40) to occupy buildings.

Reports of paid protesters were supported by Party of Regions member Volodymyr Landik and the First Deputy Prime Minister Vitaliy Yarema.

=== Media portrayal ===
Russian and Ukrainian sources differed greatly in the way they portrayed the pro-Russian demonstrators. Militants who took over government buildings in the Donetsk Oblast were consistently labeled as "separatists" and "terrorists" by the Ukrainian government and the Western media, whilst Russian media and officials referred to the protesters as "supporters of federalization". Russian media and the militants themselves referred to the Ukrainian transitional government in Kyiv as "nationalist" and as "fascist". Russian news broadcasts also featured claims of foreign involvement on the side of the Ukrainian government. In the Ukrainian media, the derogatory term "Colorado beetle" was used for the pro-Russian demonstrators and militants, in reference to the Ribbon of St. George they wore. Starting in the Russian media, the wave of unrest came to be referred to in Russia and Russian-controlled parts of Ukraine as the "Russian Spring", a reference to both the Prague Spring of 1968 and the Arab Spring of 2010–2011.

== Unrest by region ==
=== Crimea ===
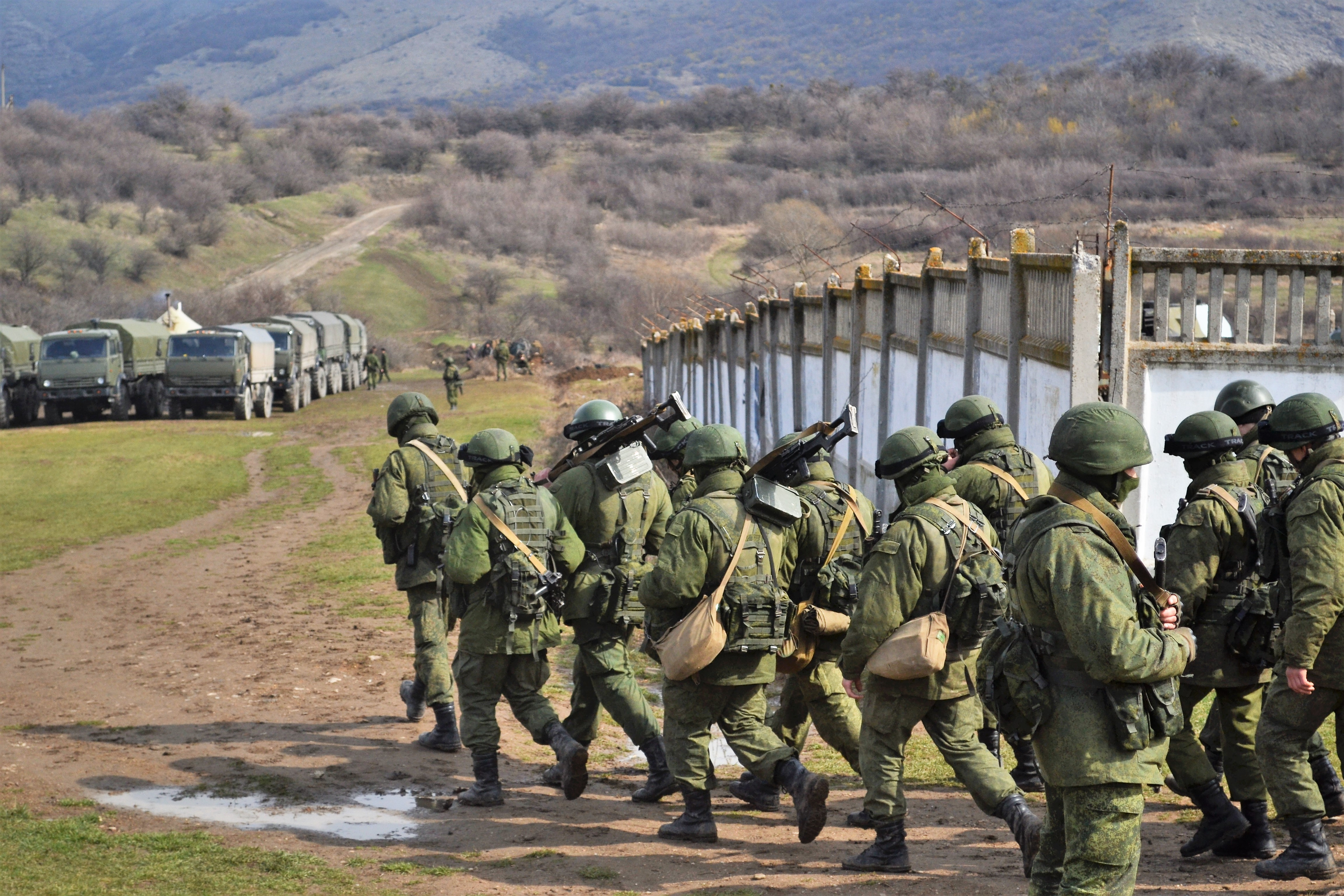
Russian "little green men" during the seizure of Perevalne military base, 9 March 2014

Following the removal of Ukrainian president Viktor Yanukovych on 22 February 2014, various protests and counter-protests were held in Crimea, including by anti-Maidan Russian nationalists who sought the peninsula's annexation by Russia and by Crimean Tatars who supported Ukrainian unity.

Beginning on 26 February, unidentified militants, subsequently confirmed to be Russian troops by Vladimir Putin, began to gradually take control of the Crimean Peninsula. During this time, the question of joining the Russian Federation was put to a referendum, which had an official turnout of 83 per cent and resulted in a 96% affirmative vote but has been condemned by European Union, American, Ukrainian, and Crimean Tatar officials and by the United Nations General Assembly as a violation of the Ukrainian constitution and international law. On 17 March, the Crimean Parliament declared independence from Ukraine and asked to join the Russian Federation. On 18 March, Russia and Crimea signed a treaty of accession of the Republic of Crimea and Sevastopol into the Russian Federation. On 21 March, the accession treaty was ratified, and the establishment of two new constituent entities in the Russian Federation was marked by a 30-gun salute under an executive order of the Russian President. The U.N. General Assembly passed a non-binding resolution by 100 to 11 votes declaring that the referendum was invalid and that the incorporation of Crimea into Russia was illegal.

Around 3,000 people had fled Crimea by 1 April, and 80% of them were Crimean Tatars. Teams from the Organization for Security and Co-operation in Europe (OSCE) assisted internally displaced persons who had resettled from Crimea in western Ukraine in the Ivano-Frankivsk Oblast and the Chernivtsi Oblast. The number of refugees, primarily Crimean Tatars, continued to rise, and by 20 May the Office of the United Nations High Commissioner for Refugees (UNHCR) said that about 10,000 people had been displaced.

=== Donetsk Oblast ===
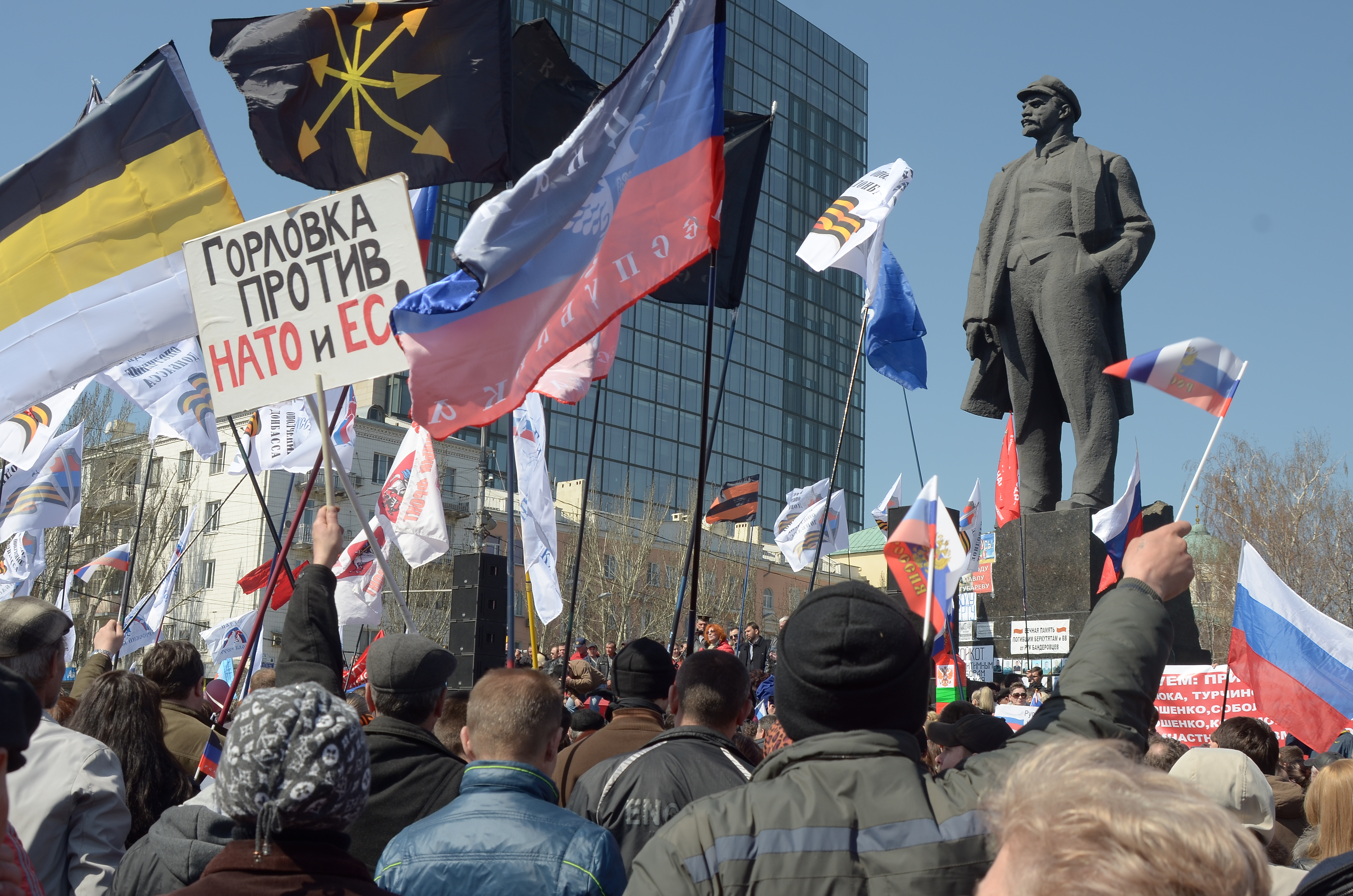
Pro-Russian protest in Donetsk, 6 April 2014. Pictured are flags of the Donetsk People's Republic, the Russian Empire, and the Eurasian Youth Union.

Pro-Russian protesters occupied the Donetsk regional state administration (RSA) building from 1 to 6 March, before being removed by the Security Service of Ukraine.

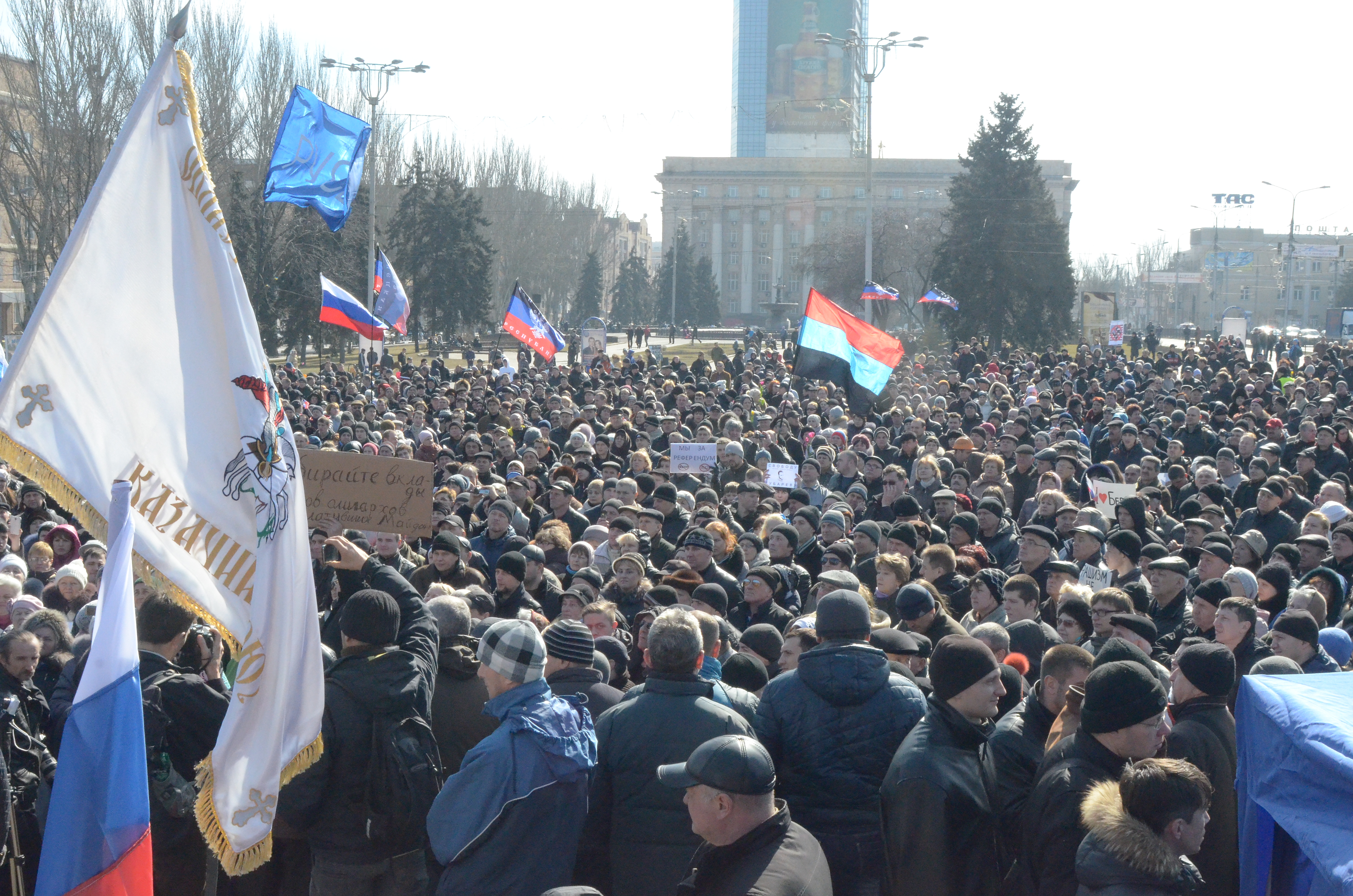
Pro-Russian protesters in Donetsk, 8 March 2014

The 13th of March was marked by violent clashes between pro-Maidan and anti-Maidan protesters in Donetsk. A large group of anti-Maidan protesters broke through a police cordon and began to attack a smaller pro-Maidan demonstration. In interviews with OSCE monitors, bystanders described how a group of around thirty pro-Maidan protesters "were forced to seek shelter in a police bus that was surrounded by attackers." The windows of the bus "were smashed, and irritant gas was dispersed inside, forcing the group to exit the bus, where they were then subjected to beatings and verbal abuse." A pro-Ukrainian protester was stabbed to death during the violence. A report by the OSCE said that "police forces" failed "to take adequate measures to protect the pro-Maidan assembly" and "could be observed treating the anti-Maidan protesters in a favourable manner." After this day of violence, interviewees told the OSCE that residents of Donetsk had decided not to organize more peaceful pro-Maidan demonstrations, "out of fear for their safety."

On Sunday, 6 April, pro-Russian protesters held a rally in Donetsk pushing for a referendum on independence. A group of 1,000 protestors broke away from the crowd and stormed the RSA building, with the police offering little resistance. They then occupied the building and raised the Russian flag over it while the people outside chanted, "Russia, Russia". 100 people proceeded to barricade themselves in the building.

The separatists declared that if officials refused to hold an extraordinary session, announcing a referendum to join Russia, they would declare unilateral control by forming a "People's Mandate" at noon on 7 April, and dismiss all elected council members and MPs. The people who voted within the RSA were not elected to the positions they assumed. According to the Information Telegraph Agency of Russia, the declaration was voted on by some regional legislators, however other reports say that neither the Donetsk city administration nor local district councils in city neighbourhoods delegated any representatives to the session. According to the Ukrainian government, the seizure of RSA buildings by pro-Russian forces was part of "a script" that was "written in the Russian Federation" to destabilize Ukraine, carried out by "about 1,500 radicals in each region who spoke with clear Russian accents".

On 6 April, the leaders of the separatist group Donetsk Republic announced that a referendum on whether Donetsk Oblast should "join the Russian Federation" would take place "no later than May 11." Additionally, the group's leaders have appealed to Russian President Vladimir Putin to send Russian peacekeeping forces to the region. The group has been banned in Ukraine since 2007. The group's leader, Andrei Purgin, had been arrested weeks prior on charges of separatism. The political leader of the state was the self-declared People's Governor Pavel Gubarev, a former member of the Progressive Socialist Party of Ukraine, who was also under arrest on charges of separatism.

In response to these actions, acting Ukrainian President Oleksandr Turchynov vowed to launch a major counter-terrorism operation against separatist movements in the country's eastern regions. Later that day, the SBU office in Donetsk was retaken by SBU Alpha Group. The Ukrainian special forces unit led by the Ukrainian vice prime minister for law enforcement, Vitaliy Yarema, that was supposed to restore control over the Donetsk RSA building, however, refused to storm it and remove the separatists. Turchynov offered amnesty to the separatists if they laid down their arms and surrendered, and also offered concessions that included devolution of power to regions, and the protection of the Russian language in law. Many in Donetsk expressed disapproval toward the actions of the separatists.

==== Government building seizures ====
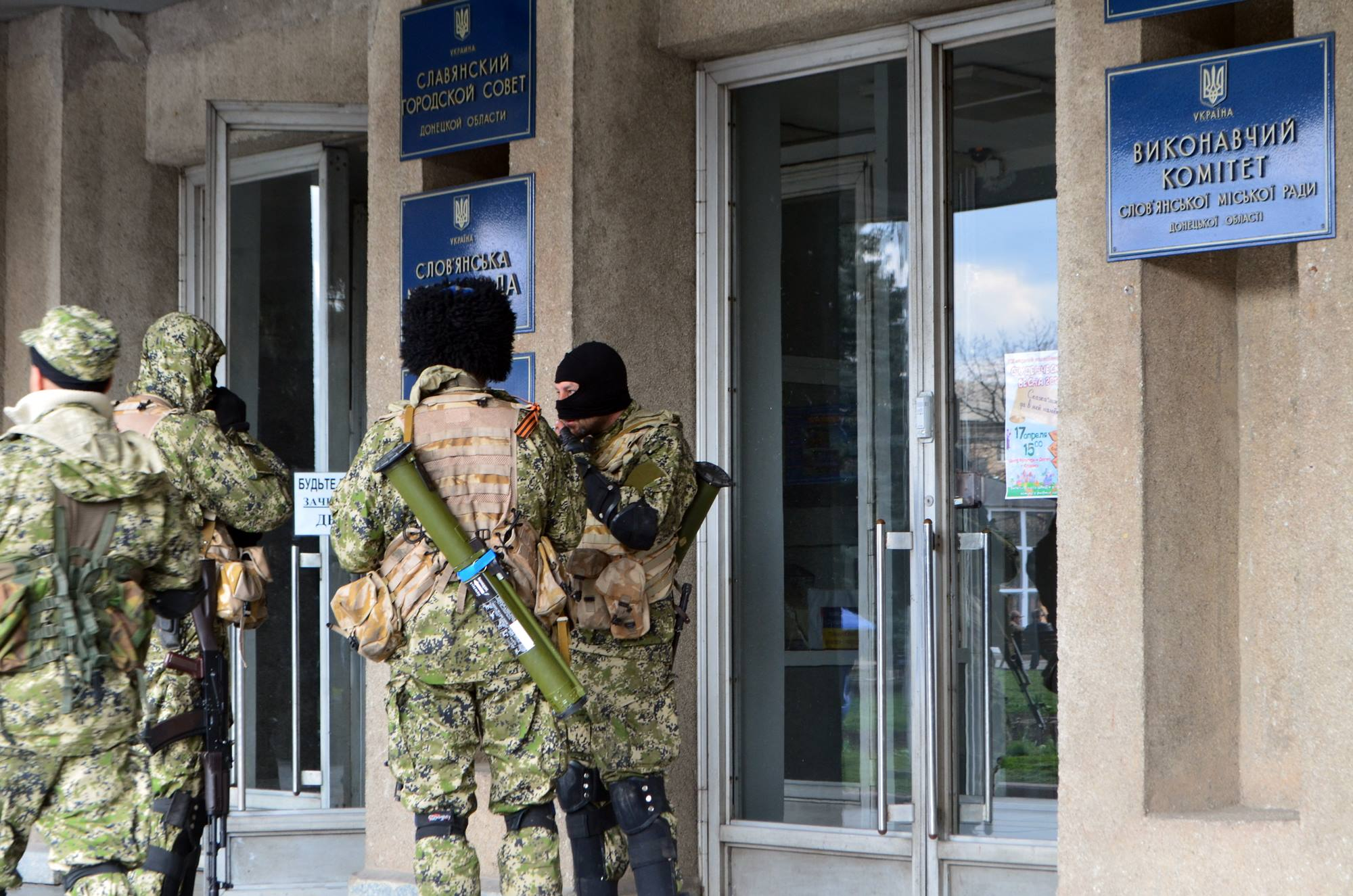
Sloviansk city council under control of masked men armed with Kalashnikov assault rifles and RPG-26 rocket launchers

As political scientist Taras Kuzio writes, "Russia transformed protestors in the Donbas into armed insurgents; this was never an organic process." On 12 April, a group of masked militants, formed in Crimea and led by former officer of Russian security services Igor Girkin, captured the executive committee building, the police department, and SBU office in Sloviansk, a city in the northern part of the Donetsk Oblast. Ukrainian Internal Affairs Minister Arsen Avakov labelled the gunmen "terrorists" and swore to use the Ukrainian special forces to retake the building.

Seizures of police stations and other government buildings by armed separatist groups also occurred in other cities in Donetsk Oblast, including Donetsk City proper, Kramatorsk, Druzhkivka, Horlivka, Mariupol, and Yenakiieve. Ukrainian transitional president Oleksandr Turchynov launched a full-scale 'anti-terror' military operation to reclaim the buildings.

Vitaly Yarema said that Russian Special Forces units, including the 45th Parachute Guards Regiment usually stationed near Moscow, were operating on Ukrainian territory in the cities of Kramatorsk and Sloviansk. On 16 April, the number of Russian special forces troops was said to be 450.

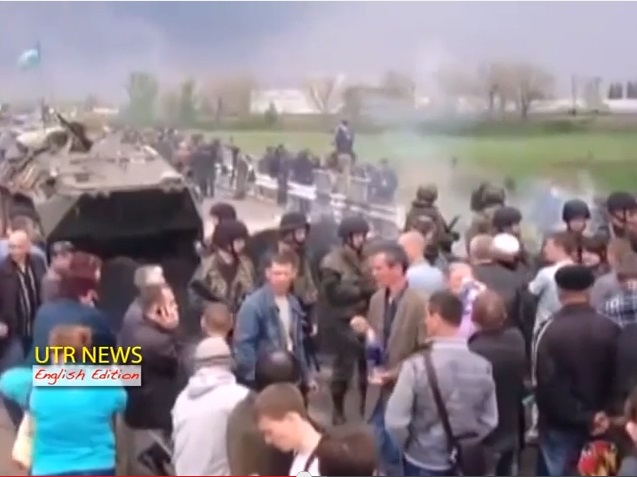
Separatists block Ukrainian military near Sloviansk, April 2014

By 16 April, the 'anti-terror' operation being conducted by the Ukrainian government in Donetsk Oblast had hit some stumbling blocks. Protesters seized Ukrainian armoured vehicles in Kramatorsk, and sent soldiers away in Sloviansk. During the night of 16 April, about 300 pro-Russian protesters attacked a Ukrainian military unit in Mariupol, throwing petrol bombs. Internal Affairs Minister Arsen Avakov said that troops were forced to open fire, resulting in the killing of three of the attackers.

The Geneva Statement of 17 April did not result in the end of the government building occupations in Donetsk Oblast. Two pro-Russian groups in Mariupol said that they 'felt betrayed' by the action taken in Geneva. A truce declared for Easter Sunday was broken by an attack upon a separatist checkpoint in Sloviansk, further inflaming tensions.

The situation remained tense on 23 April, with the occupation of government buildings ongoing throughout the region. OSCE monitors observed that the city administration building, SBU building, and police station in Sloviansk remained heavily fortified by armed groups of men with masks and automatic weapons. The city remained quiet, with no protests occurring. However, the monitors believed that the city remained under heavy surveillance, not only by people in uniforms and masks, but also by many figures in civilian clothing. One resident said that people in Sloviansk were afraid to discuss their opinions of the occupiers.

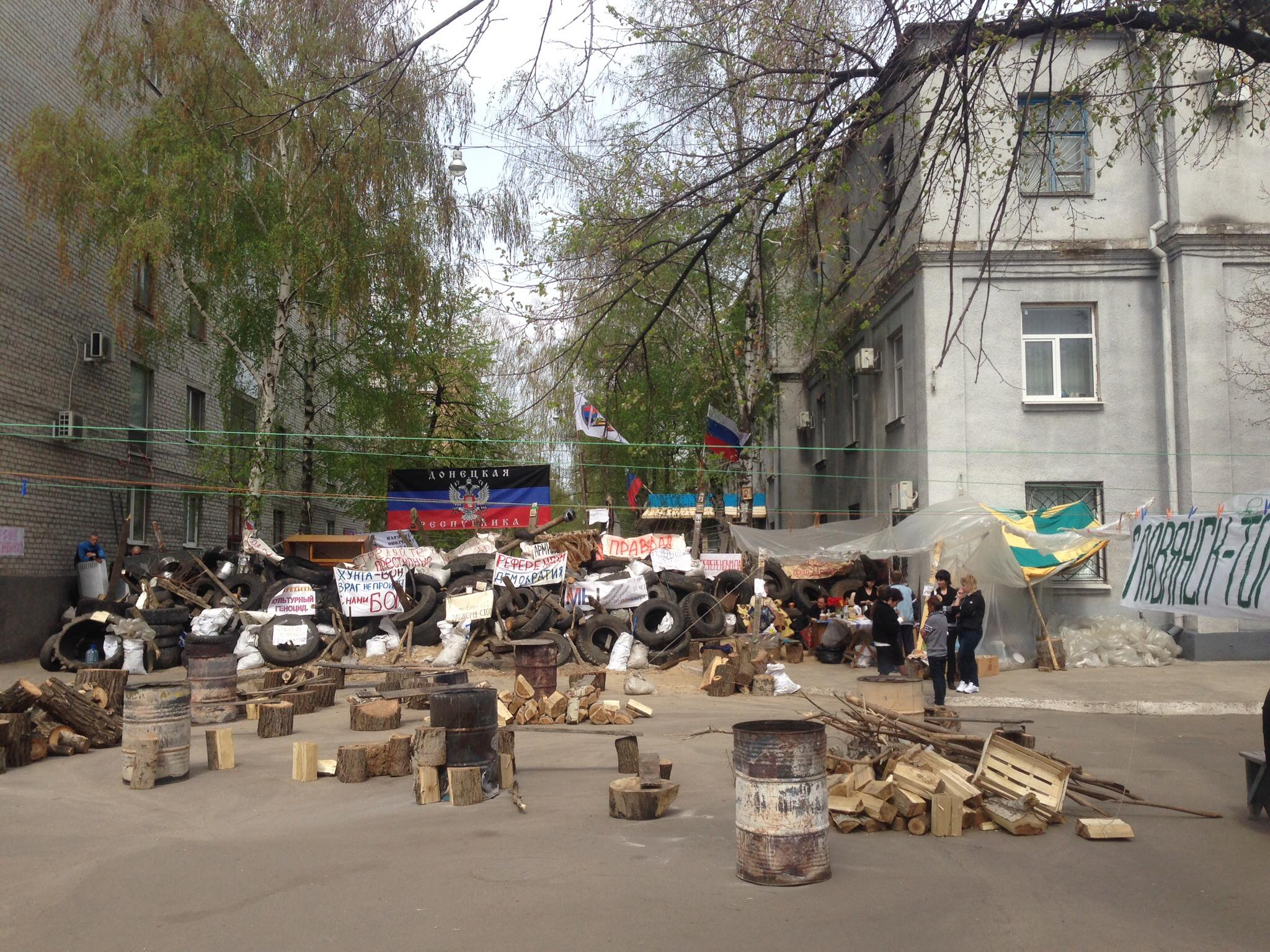
Barricade in Sloviansk, 23 April 2014

On 24 April, Ukrainian forces made a series of 'probing attacks' into Sloviansk against the insurgents. The self-proclaimed separatist mayor of the city, Vyacheslav Ponomarev, declared in response that 'We will make Stalingrad out of this town.' The Ukrainian government then stated on 25 April that it would 'fully blockade the city of Sloviansk,' and continue with the 'anti-terror' operation. Amid the increasing tensions, separatists in Sloviansk detained seven international monitors on an OSCE military verification mission in Ukraine, who had been traveling into the city on a bus, along with the bus driver and five accompanying Ukrainian soldiers. The journalists were being held at the occupied SBU building. Access to the city remained unrestricted despite the supposed Ukrainian army blockade, with separatist barricades guarded by fewer people than on previous days. Local residents said that the separatist administration in Sloviansk provided no administrative services to citizens.

Leaflets released by the Donetsk People's Republic were distributed on 26 April, notifying citizens of a referendum on the question of whether or not they supported the proclamation of "state sovereignty" by the Republic to be held on 11 May. In the morning on the next day, two members of the OSCE special monitoring mission were held by a group of unarmed men from the Donbas People's Militia in Yenakiieve. They were taken to the occupied city hall, questioned, and then released after a letter sent by the mission's office in Kyiv confirmed the credentials of the monitors. A large pro-government rally in Donetsk city marched in protest against the violence in Donetsk Oblast and the attempted assassination of Kharkiv mayor Hennadiy Kernes on 28 April. The rally was swiftly and violently broken up by separatists armed with baseball bats, iron rods, firecrackers, and shields.

==== Second counter-offensive ====
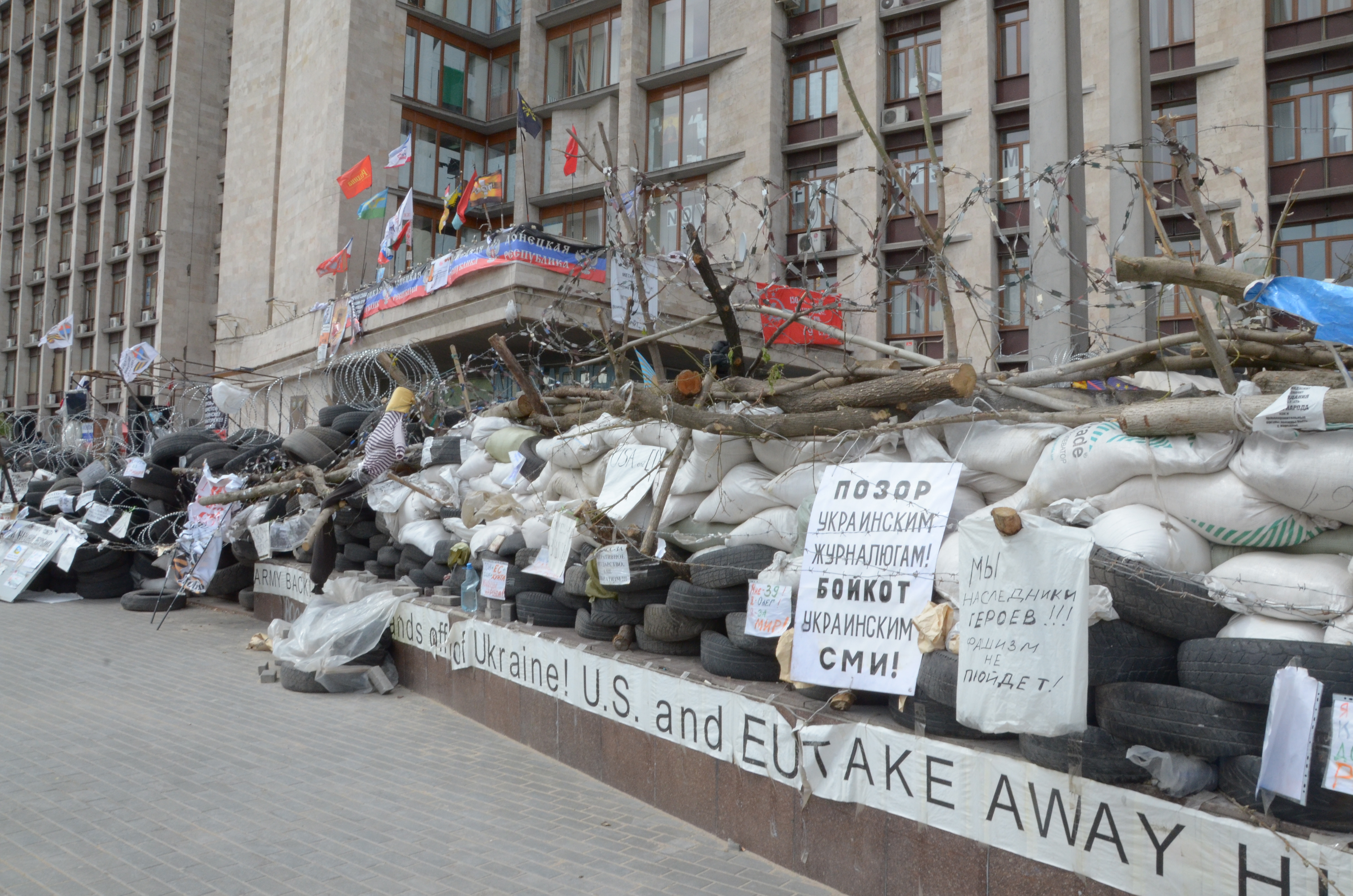
The barricade outside Donetsk RSA featuring anti-western slogans some of which read (in Russian): «Shame on Ukrainian churnalists, boycott Ukrainian media!» (Russian: Позор украинским журналюгам, бойкот украинским сми!); «Federation is not separatism!»

A new counteroffensive by government forces on Sloviansk during the early morning of 2 May resulted in the downing of two government helicopters and casualties on both sides. As a result, Ukrainian forces gained control of all separatist checkpoints and of half the city. President Oleksandr Turchynov said that "many insurgents" were "dead, wounded and arrested." In the early morning on the next day, the counteroffensive then targeted to Kramatorsk and Andriivka in Donetsk Oblast. Serious fighting resulted in the recapture of the occupied buildings in Kramatorsk by government forces, and at least ten separatists were said to have been killed in Andriivka.

All of the international military monitors who had been held in Sloviansk were released by Vyacheslav Ponomaryov on 3 May. On the same day, protesters in the city of Donetsk stormed and occupied the chairman of the regional government's private business office and the SBU building, smashing windows and ransacking files as an act of revenge for the clashes in Odesa.

Kramatorsk was reoccupied by militants on 4 May, and Sloviansk saw renewed fighting on 5 May, resulting in the deaths of four Ukrainian soldiers. Fierce fighting took place in Mariupol starting 5 May. Posters plastered on the occupied city administration building read "OSCE get out" or "OSCE you cheat". As part of the counteroffensive, government forces recaptured the building on 7 May, but then left it, allowing the separatists to quickly re-occupy it.

Occupied buildings in Donetsk had been heavily fortified by 6 May, and Donetsk International Airport was closed to all traffic. The regional television broadcasting centre remained occupied by about thirty camouflaged insurgents with AK-47s. A BTR-70 was parked outside the building, along with barricades made of sandbags and tyres. A similar presence was observed at the RSA building.

On 7 May, Russian president Vladimir Putin asked the separatists to delay the planned 11 May referendum on the status of Donetsk. Denis Pushilin, the leader of the Donetsk People's Republic, refused. In response, Ukrainian transitional prime minister Arseniy Yatsenyuk referred to Putin's words as "hot air" and vowed that the counter-offensive in Donetsk would continue.

A large skirmish erupted in Mariupol on 9 May, when government troops launched an attack on a police station in the city, resulting in the killing of at least twenty people. These were described by the Ukrainian government as "militants" and "terrorists", though some local residents said that they were unarmed protestors.

==== Referendum ====
The disputed referendum on the status of Donetsk Oblast was held on 11 May. According to representatives of the Donetsk People's Republic, 89% voted in favour of self-rule, and 10% voted against. Turnout was said to be 75%. OSCE monitors did not observe the referendum, as the situation in Donetsk after the skirmish in Mariupol was said to be "volatile", forcing them to restrict their operations in the region. After the results were announced, leader of the Republic Denis Pushilin said that "all Ukrainian military troops in the region would be considered occupying forces". In response to the perceived weakness of the Ukrainian army, some Ukrainians who opposed the insurgents formed the "Donbas Volunteer Battalion", modeled on the Ukrainian partisan groups that fought against both the German Reich and the Soviet Union during the Second World War.

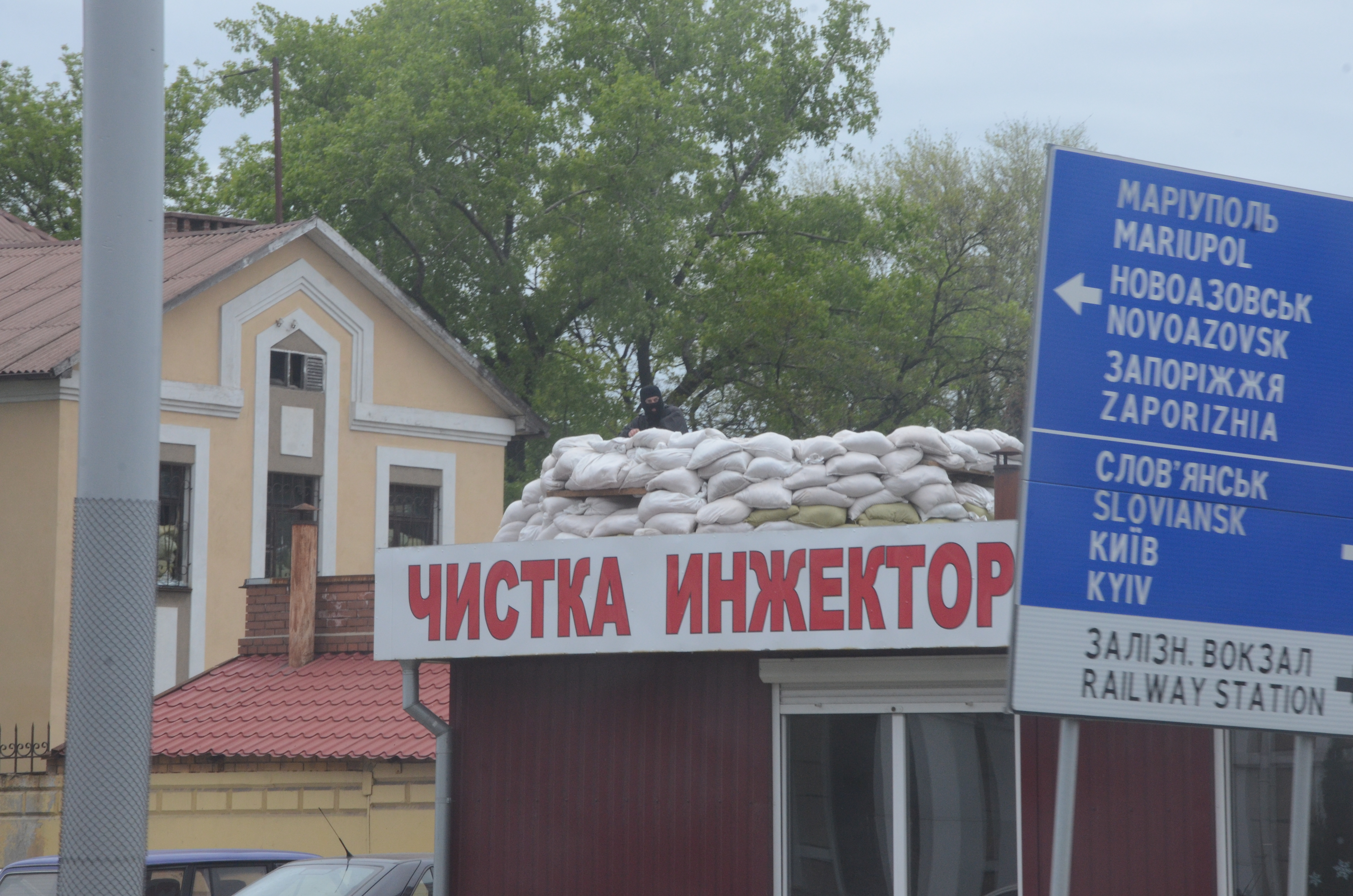
Insurgent emplacement in Donetsk, also showing a road sign that points to major conflict areas: Sloviansk and Mariupol.

Steelworkers and security guards from Metinvest, along with local police, began joint patrols in the city of Mariupol on 15 May. These groups forced the insurgents out of the buildings that they had been occupying. A representative of Mariupol supporters of the Donetsk People's Republic, Denis Kuzmenko, was party to a deal that led to this vacation of buildings by the insurgents, but a local commander of those insurgents who had been occupying the building said that "someone is trying to sow discord among us; someone has signed something, but we will continue our fight" and that "everyone ran away". Steelworkers could be seen removing barricades from the city centre and also cleaning up the burnt city administration building. By the morning of 16 May, Associated Press journalists could find no trace of the insurgents in Mariupol city centre. On 16 May, however, it seemed that separatists were not banished from the city, as reporters from The Washington Post said that about a hundred pro-Russian activists gathered on the steps of the city administration building and that the separatist flag continued to fly over it.

Rinat Akhmetov, oligarch and owner of Metinvest, called for non-violent protests against the separatists in Donbas on 19 May. In response to this call, cars gathered in front of the Donetsk RSA building and continually honked their horns. OSCE monitors said that some elderly people threw stones and water bottles at the cars as they passed by the RSA. Another group of thirty people outside the RSA chanted the slogan "Akhmetov is an enemy of the people" while holding banners that said "Akhmetov is a thief and is a supporter of fascism" and "Are you a slave to Akhmetov?"

The confederal state of Novorossiya was proclaimed by Pavel Gubarev on 22 May, incorporating both the Donetsk People's Republic and the Luhansk People's Republic. "New Russia" (Russian: Novorossiya) hearkens back to a term used by the Russian Empire to refer to modern eastern and southern Ukraine. A few days later, on 26 May, a heated battle broke out between separatist insurgents that had been in control of Donetsk International Airport, and Ukrainian government forces. Around fifty insurgents were killed in the fighting, which resulted in their losing control of the airport. Chechen paramilitaries, along with others from Russia, fought Ukrainian forces during the battle. According to Artur Gasparian, a member of the insurgent unit that had been holding the airport, the majority of the separatists' losses were due to friendly fire.

Members of the Vostok battalion, the pro-Russian insurgent group that fought Ukrainian forces at the airport, took control over the Donetsk RSA building on 28 May and removed the leaders of the Donetsk People's Republic. Participants in the action said that it was an "emergency measure" to halt "a sharp rise in looting and crime, as well as disorder within leadership." They were seen removing barricades and rubbish that was left by those previously in control of the building.

==== Continued fighting ====
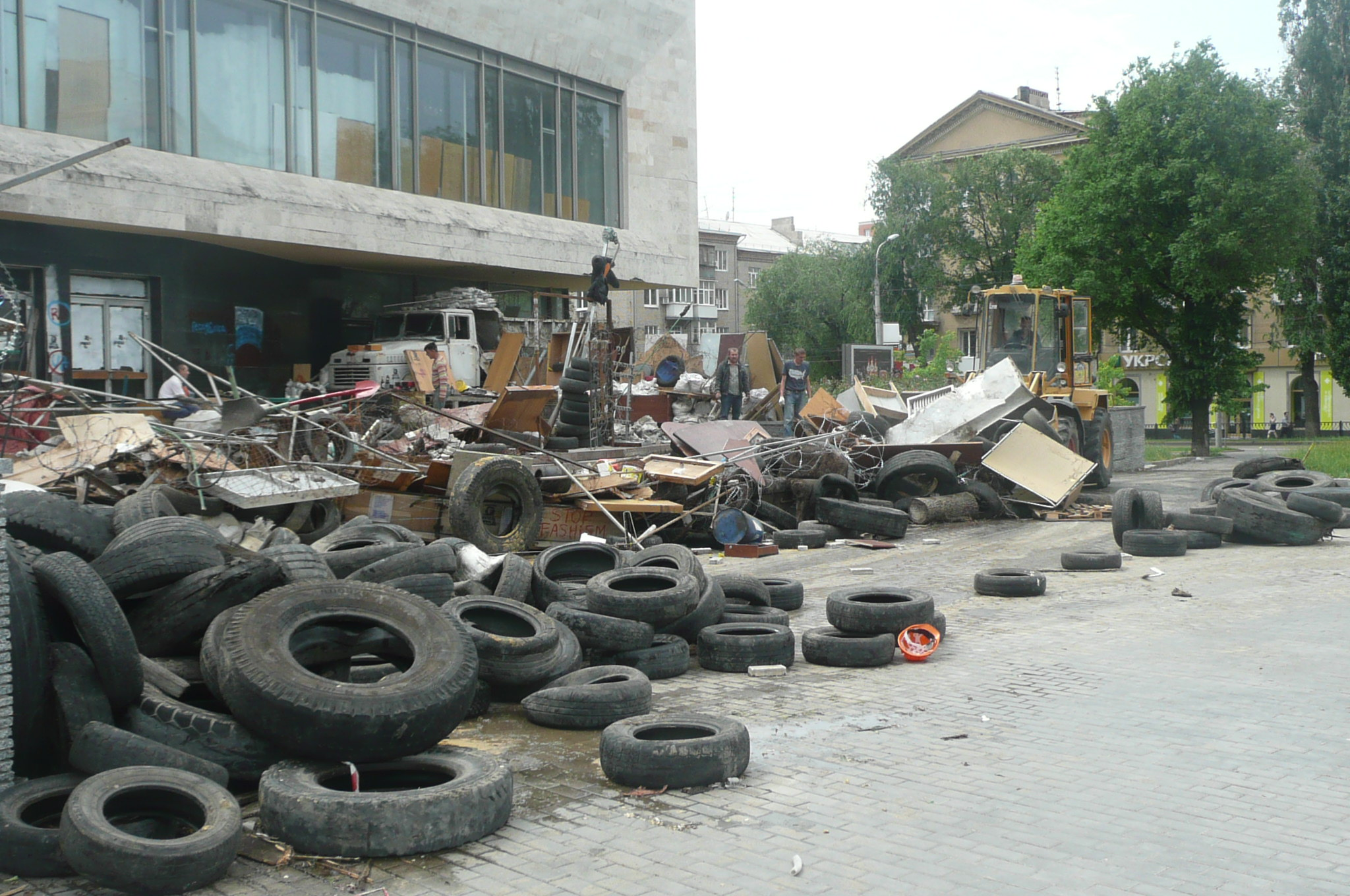
Vostok Battalion members dismantling the barricade at Donetsk RSA on 3 June.

Fighting continued through the month of June. As part of Ukrainian president Petro Poroshenko's fifteen-point peace plan, a frequently broken ceasefire spanned from 20 June until the 30th. A renewed government offensive after the ceasefire broke down resulted in heavy losses for the separatists, forcing them to withdraw from northern Donetsk Oblast, including many cities that had been under their control since April, such as Sloviansk, Druzhkivka, Kostyantynivka, and Kramatorsk. Heavy fighting continued in the following months until the signing of the Minsk Protocol in early September, which established a ceasefire.

==== Attacks on journalists ====
Separatists of the Donetsk region undertook numerous attacks on press members. On 10 April, protesters outside the Donetsk RSA attacked Belarusian journalists for speaking the Belarusian language, and not Russian; Ukrainian journalists were forced to speak Russian to avoid angering pro-Russian protesters. According to Kyiv Post, they also attacked reporters from Russia Today, but RT did not carry the story. Days later on 12 April, a group of 150 people supported armed militants outside the police station in Sloviansk who were hostile to journalists, telling them to "go back to Kyiv".

An unknown man set the car of the editor-in-chief of the News of Donbas ablaze. The editor had been receiving anonymous threats from the separatists. On 19 April, the offices of local newspaper Pro Gorod in Torez, 80 kilometres (50 mi) southeast of Donetsk, were set on fire.

Separatists torched the offices of the newspaper Provintsia in Kostiantynivka on 23 April, after previously harassing newspaper staff and labeling them members of the 'Right Sector movement.' Stepan Chirich, a Belarusian reporter with the Russian NTV channel, disappeared in Dnipropetrovsk Oblast. Another journalist, Evgenii Gapich, a photographer for the Reporter newspaper from Ivano-Frankivsk, disappeared in Horlivka; his whereabouts are unknown, but allegedly he has been held in detention by separatist forces in Sloviansk. Furthermore, Simon Ostrovsky, a journalist with Vice News, was captured by unidentified people in uniform in Sloviansk and released after four days. British journalist Graham Phillips was taken captive by both the separatists and the Ukrainian army.

A report by Human Rights Watch criticized the Ukrainian government for "the serial arrests of Russian journalists in Ukraine."

=== Luhansk Oblast ===
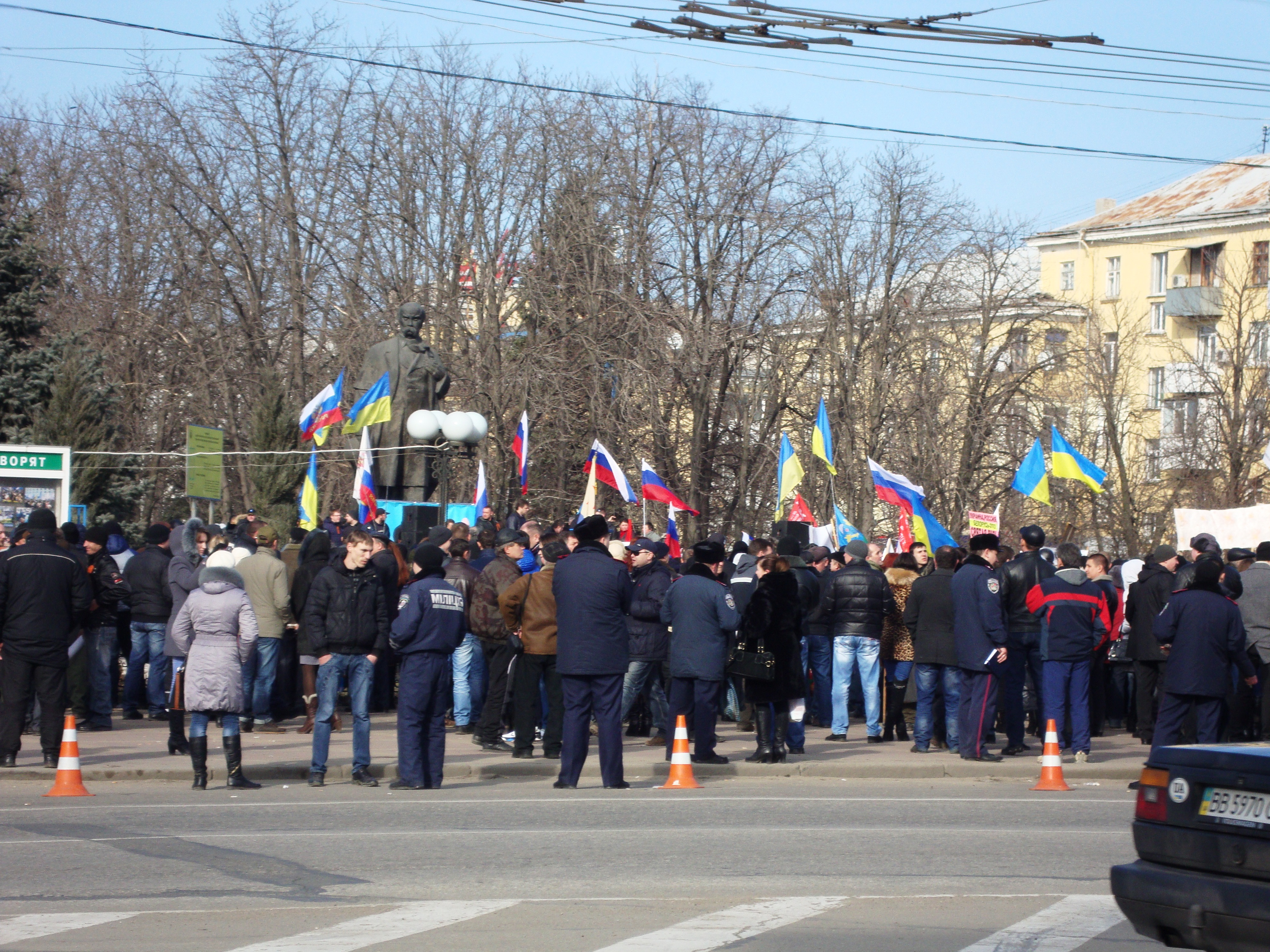
Protesters around a statue of Taras Shevchenko on Heroes Square in Luhansk, waving both Russian and Ukrainian flags, 1 March 2014

In protest against the proposed cancelling of the regional language law, the regional administration of Luhansk Oblast voted to demand that the Russian language be given official language status. They also demanded the stopping of the persecution of former Berkut officers, the disarming of Maidan self-defence units, and the banning of a number of far-right political organizations, like Svoboda and UNA-UNSO. In the event that the authorities failed to comply with the demands, the Oblast administration reserved the "right to ask for help from the brotherly people of the Russian Federation".

Government buildings in Luhansk have been occupied multiple times. A peaceful pro-Maidan demonstration on Heroes Square, outside the Luhansk city administration building, was attacked by anti-Maidan counter-demonstrators on 9 March. The attackers then stormed the building and occupied it but were swiftly removed by government forces. The Security Service of Ukraine (SBU) local headquarters was occupied on 6 April, along with the SBU's armoury of over 300 machine guns. Pro-Russian activists discussed plans for a "Luhansk Parliamentary Republic" on 8 April 2014. 1,500 were involved in the building's occupation. The occupiers referred to themselves as the Army of the South-East (Russian: Армия Юго-Востока). According to The Guardian, the personnel include former members of the Berkut special police.

The mood remained tense in Luhansk on 14 April. During the morning, up to 300 persons were observed at the entrance of the SBU building. There has been no indication that pro-Russian demonstrators in Luhansk would enact the terms of the Geneva Statement on Ukraine, and demonstrations have continued. Those occupying the SBU building told OSCE monitors on 20 April that they would demobilize once occupied buildings in Kyiv were vacated by Euromaidan supporters. The monitors also encountered a roadblock near the village of Rayhorodka, in Novoaidar Raion. It was guarded by about ten people in civilian clothes, including the local Orthodox priest. They stated that they set up the roadblock on 14 April to protect their village from any separatist incursions. A commander of the Ukrainian army indicated that no incidents had occurred at the roadblock so far, but that unknown armed individuals had been seen approaching it in the night.

A rally outside the SBU building to elect a 'people's government' in Luhansk occurred on 21 April. At the rally, protesters called for an 11 May referendum on the status of Luhansk Oblast with three options: be part of a Ukrainian federation, join the Russian Federation, or remain part of a unitary Ukraine. Around 1,500 participants were observed at the peak of the rally. The leaders of the rally said that they were not separatists and sought a peaceful solution that would allow Luhansk to remain within Ukraine.

The OSCE monitoring mission reported that the situation in Luhansk on 23 April was 'stable' and that the area around the occupied SBU building was 'quiet'. The monitors met with representatives of a non-governmental organization that said they had been held captive for six hours within the building on 21 April and that about 100 men in unmarked uniforms with machine guns were present inside it at the time.

==== Escalation ====
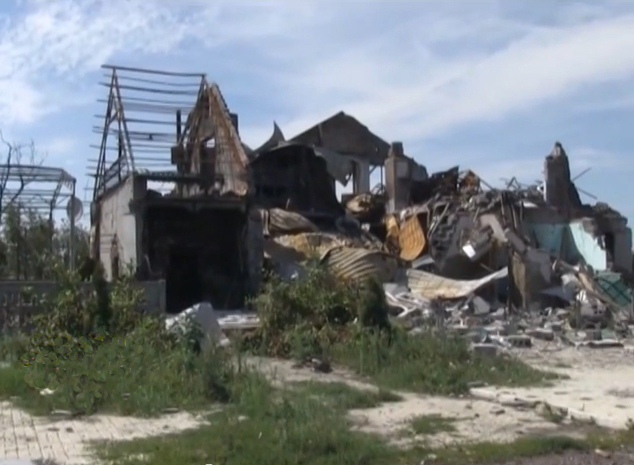
Destroyed house in Donbas, 22 July 2014

Several hundred protesters that had gathered outside the occupied SBU building proclaimed the "Luhansk People's Republic" on 27 April. They demanded that the Ukrainian government provide amnesty for all protesters, enshrine Russian as an official language, and hold a referendum on the status of the region. They issued an ultimatum that stated that if Kyiv did not meet their demands by 14:00 on 29 April, they would launch an insurgency in tandem with that of the Donetsk People's Republic.

As these demands were not met, 2,000 to 3,000 protestors stormed the Luhansk RSA building on 29 April. Previously, only the SBU building had been targeted. The building was unprotected on the exterior, but a group of riot police confronted the protesters in an inner courtyard of the building. A brief standoff resulted, but the police did nothing to stop the protesters. A Russian flag was raised over the building. Several other buildings, including a police station and the local prosecutor's office, were later seized. Twenty separatist gunmen fired machine guns at the police station to force the officers within to surrender. President Oleksander Turchynov responded to the loss of the buildings by demanding the immediate resignation of police chiefs in Donetsk and Luhansk. By 2 May, however, pro-Russian protesters occupying the city council and the television centre had left, and the prosecutor's office was freed following negotiations between authorities and separatists.

The next day, however, separatist leader and self-proclaimed mayor of Luhansk Valeriy Bolotov announced the formation of a "South-Eastern Army" to march on Kyiv. Bolotov also declared a state of emergency, introduced a curfew, a ban on political parties, and a mandate that local law enforcement officials must take an oath of allegiance to him. In a video statement, he said, "In case of not following this, you will be announced traitors of people of Luhansk, and wartime measures will be taken against you".

A GAZ Tigr heavy armoured vehicle emblazoned with the emblem of the Liberal Democratic Party of Russia was seen parked outside the RSA building on 8 May, along with men in military gear and assault rifles. Whilst speaking to OSCE monitors, the deputy governor of Luhansk Oblast said that the "security situation in the region is deteriorating due to activities of the separatists and criminal gangs." Members of the OSCE special monitoring mission were later stopped at an 'illegal' checkpoint near the village of Shchastya and held for three hours before being released.

==== Referendum ====
The disputed referendum on the status of Luhansk Oblast was held on 11 May. According to RIA Novosti, 96.2% voted in favour of self-rule. Valeriy Bolotov, leader of the Republic, declared "martial law" on 22 May. OSCE monitors said that around 70% of "shops, cafés, and banks" were closed in Luhansk city centre. Shops that remained open were sold out of various necessities, including fuel. Police were entirely absent.

The confederal state of Novorossiya was proclaimed by Pavel Gubarev on 22 May, incorporating both the Donetsk People's Republic and the Luhansk People's Republic. "Novorossiya" hearkens back to a term used by the Russian Empire to refer to modern eastern and southern Ukraine.

Explosions struck the RSA building in Luhansk on 2 June, killing eight people and wounding twenty-eight. Russian media reported that the explosions were Ukrainian airstrikes. Officials from Ukraine denied this stating instead that insurgents had fired an anti-aircraft missile at themselves. The next day, the OSCE special monitoring mission said that based on "limited observation", the "strikes were the result of non-guided rockets shot from an aircraft". A CNN investigation found clear evidence that the detonations came from the air, and the pattern of the craters suggested use of standard equipment on the Su-25, a ground-attack fighter, and the Su-27—both combat aircraft operated by Ukraine. RadioLiberty headlined a report "Despite Denials, All Evidence For Deadly Explosion Points To Kyiv". Heavy fighting in the region continued over the following months, until the signing of the Minsk Protocol in early September, which established a ceasefire.

=== Kharkiv Oblast ===
Protests were also held in Kharkiv Oblast, and the regional state administration building there was occupied multiple times.

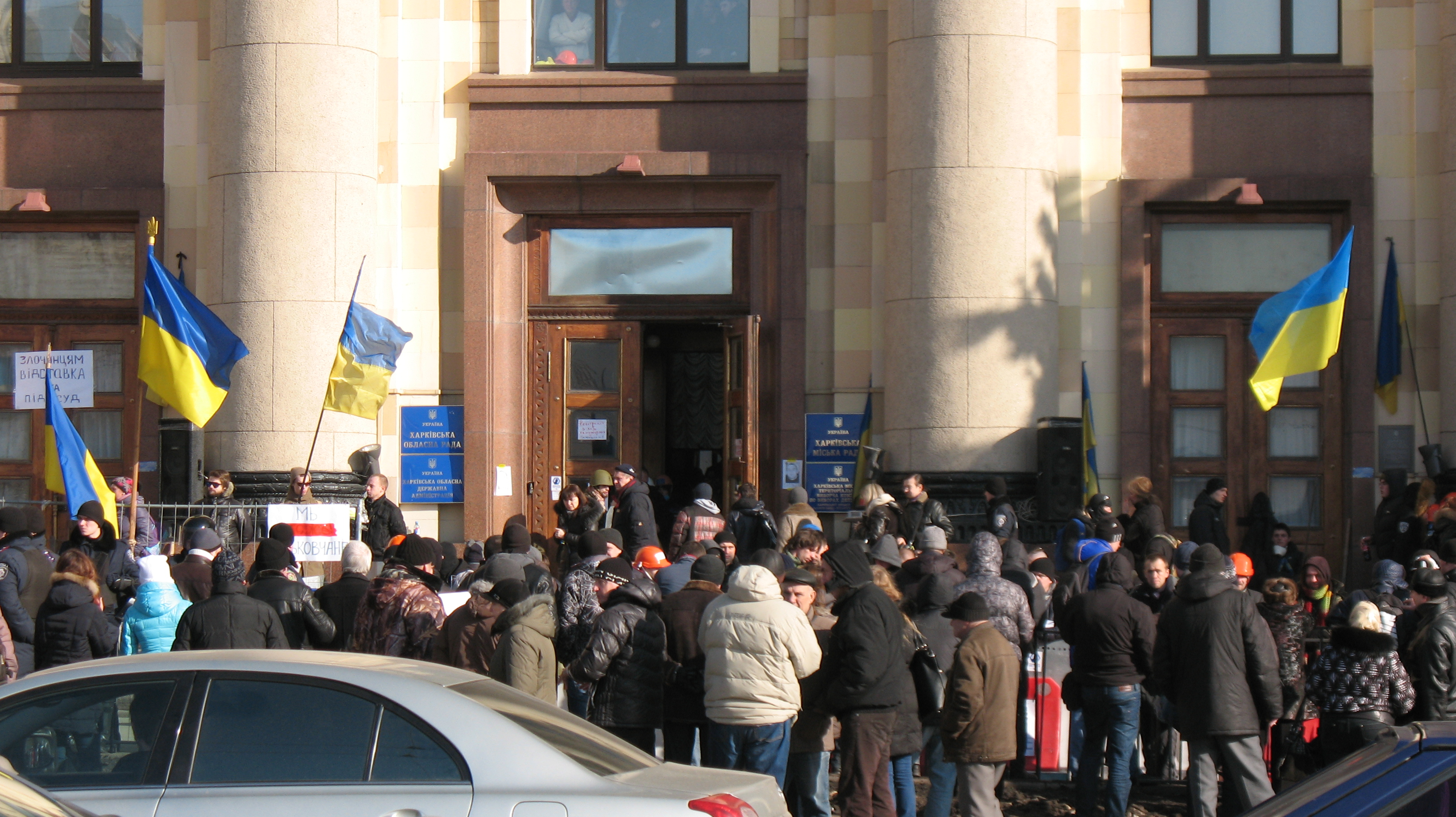
Pro-Ukrainian protesters in Kharkiv, February 2014

Unrest first gripped Kharkiv city on 22 February 2014, when Euromaidan protesters occupied the Kharkiv regional state administration (RSA) building. Later that day, several thousand pro-Ukrainian protesters tried to topple a statue of Vladimir Lenin that stood opposite the RSA building in Freedom Square. Several taxi drivers defended the monument, injuring several of the protesters. By the next day, several thousand pro-Russian protesters had gathered in the square to protect the statue. They set up a perimeter fence around it. Then governor of Kharkiv Oblast Mykhailo Dobkin made a speech to the defenders of the statue, saying that the statue was "a symbol of our city... we will leave it here and we will defend it." Local police kept Euromaidan and Anti-Maidan protesters apart until 1 March. On that day, pro-Russian activists stormed the RSA building, assaulted the Euromaidan activists who had been occupying it, and raised the Russian flag over the building. Some of the protesters were Russian citizens who had traveled to Kharkiv from Russia. According to the local media, 2,000 Russians were brought by buses with Russian number plates to Kharkiv to take part in the storming of the RSA building. Russian activist organizations confirmed that they sent Russians to "peacefully protest" in Kharkiv. Police regained control of the building by evening on the same day and replaced the Russian flag with that of Ukraine.

Demonstrations by pro-Russian and pro-Ukrainian activists in Kharkiv continued throughout the month of March. These included pro-Russian gatherings of up to 5,000 people. Despite this, the city remained relatively calm until 15 March, when two people were killed in a shootout between Ukrainian nationalists and pro-Russian activists. On the next day, pro-Russian activists broke into a Ukrainian cultural centre in Kharkiv, removed books written in the Ukrainian language, and burned them on the street outside.

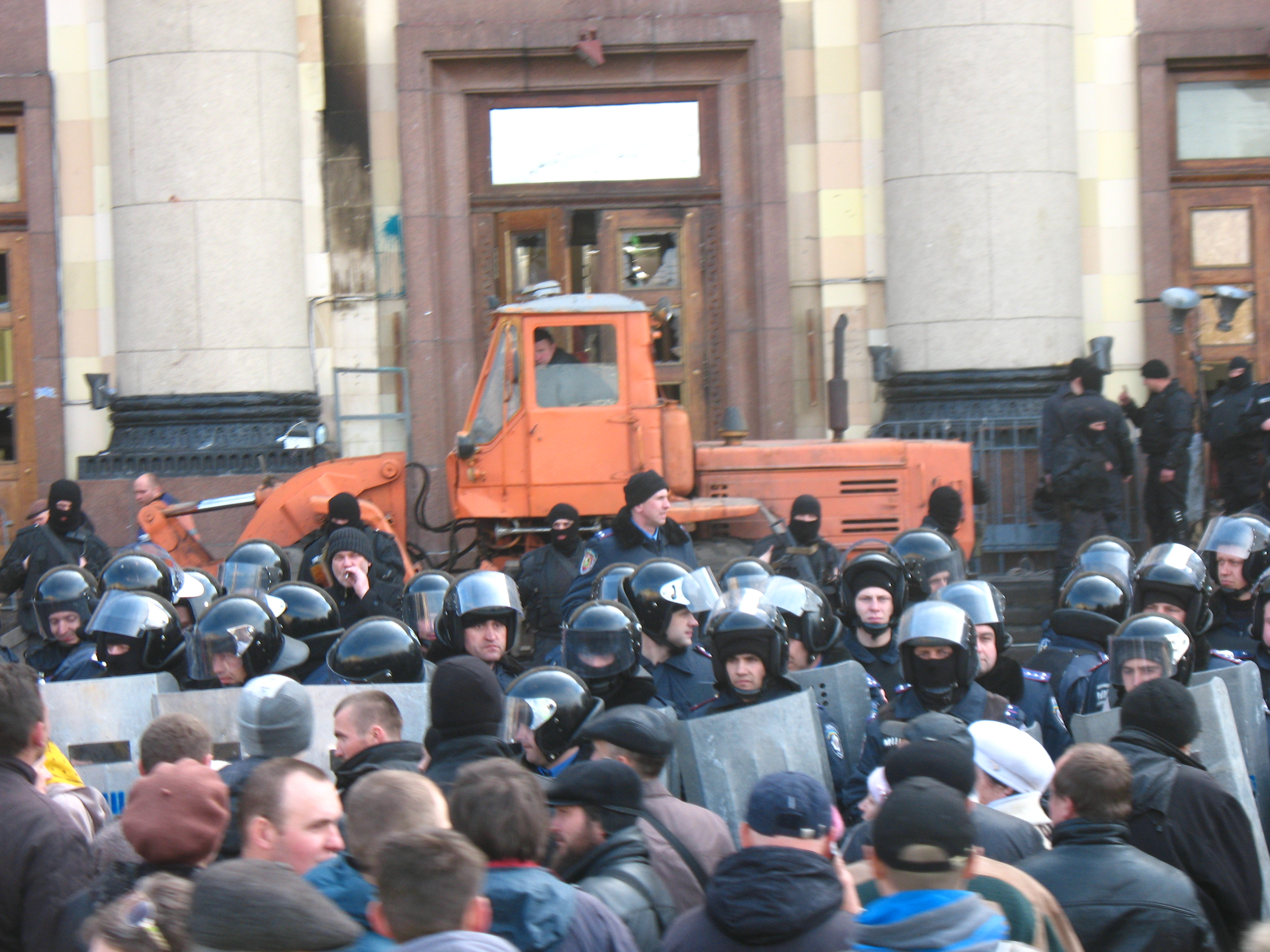
Pro-Russian protesters in Kharkiv, 8 April 2014

Pro-Russian protesters stormed and occupied the RSA building on 6 April. The next day, protesters in the occupied RSA building unilaterally declared independence from Ukraine as the "Kharkiv People's Republic." Doubts arose about the local origin of the protesters after they initially stormed an opera and ballet theatre, believing it was the city hall. By 8 April, the RSA building had been retaken by Ukrainian special forces, and seventy protesters had been arrested. 1,000 pro-Russian protesters returned to the RSA building on 13 April and rallied around it, with some entering. These protesters then holed up inside the building with Kharkiv mayor Hennadiy Kernes. Later in the day, Kernes declared his support for an autonomy referendum and amnesty for the arrested Kharkiv separatists. At least fifty pro-government protesters, who had been holding concurrent demonstrations, were severely beaten in attacks by pro-Russian protesters. Gunshots and grenade explosions were heard. Videos showed three people covered with blood being held on the metro station stairs, and separatists coming up to them, kicking them, and shouting "They are not humans!"

According to a report by the Organization for Security and Co-operation in Europe (OSCE) monitoring mission on 19 April, no protesters had been seen in front of the RSA building since 13 April. The Kharkiv City Appeals Court ruled on 17 April that 43 of the 65 protesters arrested by authorities following the takeover of the RSA building on 8 and 9 April would remain in custody. Sentences for another 16 were changed to house arrest. Three detainees were released on bail, whereas the three remaining had earlier been sentenced to house arrest.

Kharkiv remained calm over the weekend of 19–20 April, though a small, peaceful pro-Russian protest was held on Freedom Square. Demonstrations continued on Freedom Square, with 500 people gathering on 21 April to elect a so-called "people's government." Worsening economic conditions in Ukraine were cited by participants as an impetus for the demonstrations. They called for the resignation of the city mayor and prosecutor as well as the return of Viktor Yanukovych. Vladimir Varshavsky was elected as "people's governor."

More peaceful rallies were held in the morning on 23 April, with both anti-government and pro-government demonstrations held in Kharkiv city centre. Each rally was attended by around 400 people. Around 150 anti-government protesters gathered outside the Kharkiv City Council building on Constitution Square concurrently with the rallies. Later that day, over 7,000 residents held a rally in the same spot to support the unity and territorial integrity of Ukraine. The situation overall in Kharkiv remained calm, though police remained on high alert. A small group of riot police were seen guarding the RSA building on 25 April, though the police presence as a whole in the city appeared to be much reduced.

Rival demonstrations by supporters and opponents of a unitary Ukrainian state occurred on 27 April in Kharkiv city. This resulted in clashes between around 400 opponents and 500 to 600 supporters of the Ukrainian government. Police attempts to quell the unrest were not successful.

==== Shooting of Hennadiy Kernes ====
The mayor of Kharkiv, Hennadiy Kernes, was shot in the back while cycling on 28 April 2014. He was said to be in "grave, but stable" condition, but later recovered, according to Televiziyna Sluzhba Novyn on 10 May 2014. Kernes was known as a staunch opponent of the Euromaidan. However, he had also stated that he did not support the pro-Russian insurgency, and backed a united Ukraine. Mykhailo Dobkin, a former governor of Kharkiv Oblast and potential Ukrainian presidential candidate, said "You want to know my opinion, they were shooting not at Kernes, but at Kharkiv", and said that the shooting was an attempt to destabilize what was otherwise a relatively calm region.

==== Further protests ====
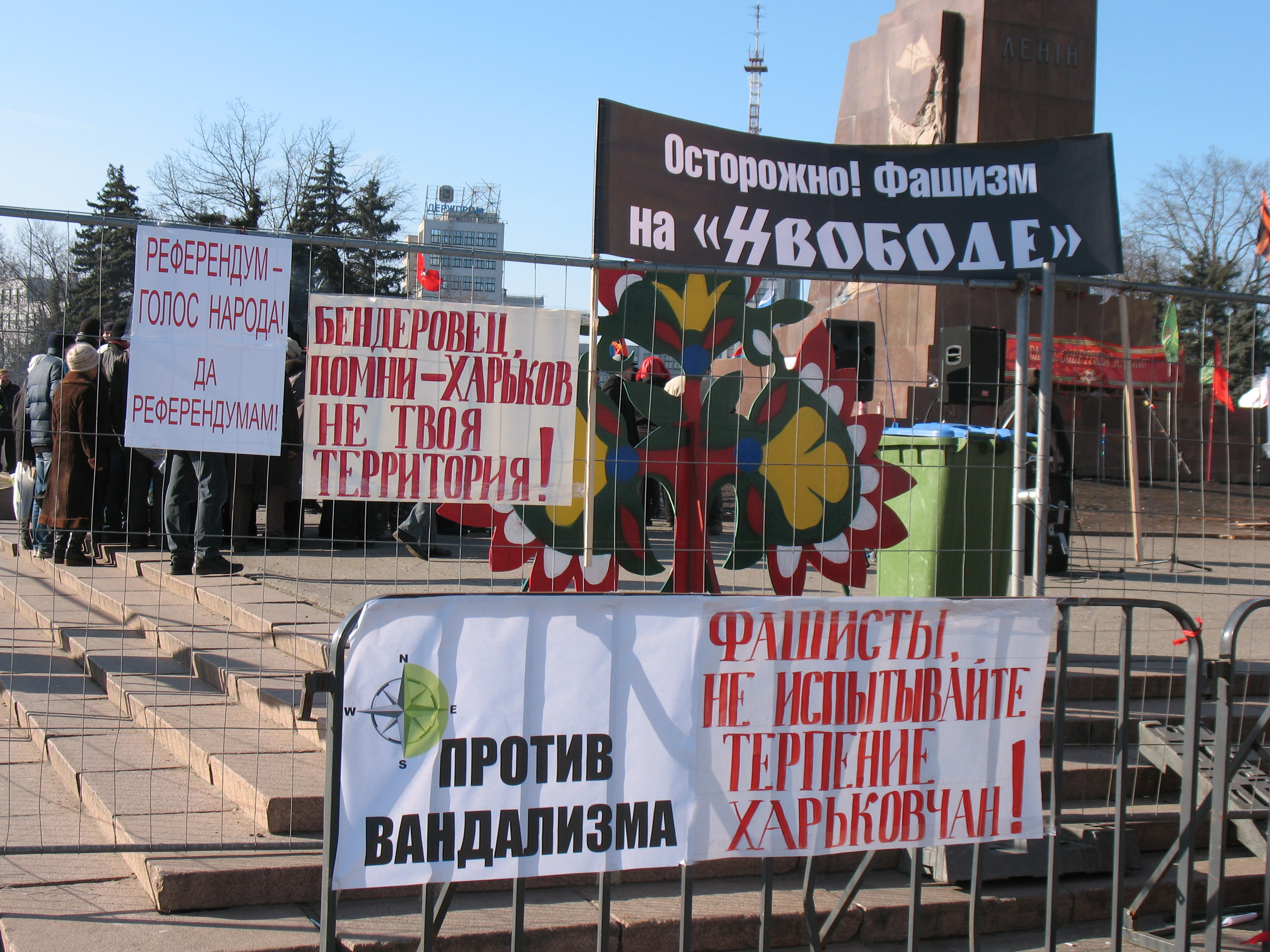
Pro-Russian signs around the statue bearing the words "Against vandalism", "Fascists, don't test the patience of Kharkiv citizens!", "Caution! Fascism is set free!" and "Banderites! REMEMBER – KHARKIV IS NOT YOUR TERRITORY".

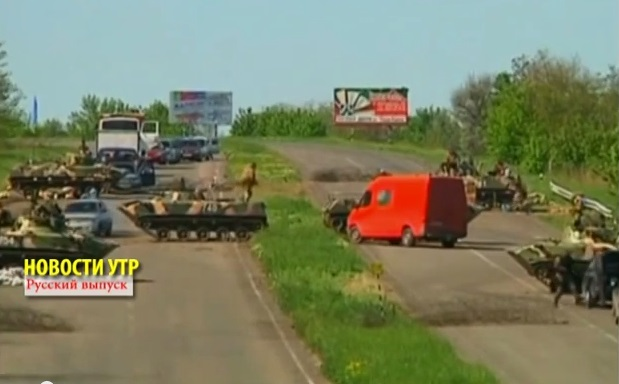
Ukrainian military roadblocks in Donetsk oblast, 8 May

Kharkiv returned to relative calm by 30 April, no rallies having been observed there by OSCE monitors. A minor demonstration by about four-hundred separatists was held in Freedom Square on 4 May. A notably increased police presence remained in and around Freedom Square. On the same day, a planned rally by pro-Ukrainian unity groups was cancelled due to concerns about potential clashes in the wake of the Odesa disaster.

Demonstrations by "opponents of Ukrainian unity" with Russian and Soviet flags were held in front of the Russian and Polish consulates in Kharkiv city on 26 May. These demonstrators initiated petitions that they said were signed by 1,500 people from Kharkiv, which called on the EU and Russia not to recognise the results of the 25 May Ukrainian presidential election. They also voiced opposition to the Ukrainian government's military operations against pro-Russian separatists in Donetsk Oblast. Mayor Hennadiy Kernes returned to Kharkiv city on 16 June, after receiving medical treatment in Israel. The city administration provided buses for around 1,000 people who came to greet him upon his return.

Demonstrations similar to the one that took place on 26 May continued throughout the month of June. One such demonstration took place on 22 June, with 800–900 people gathering on the 73rd anniversary of the German Reich's invasion of the Soviet Union. The demonstrators voiced the same concerns about the Ukrainian government's military operations in the East, protesting against Ukraine's efforts to combat separatist insurgents in Donetsk Oblast. Concurrently, around 1,000 people rallied for a ban on the Communist Party of Ukraine, and on pro-Russian demonstrations. Some of the people participating in this rally approached the location of the aforementioned pro-Russian demonstration. A verbal confrontation ensued, involving participants of both rallies. Police officers that had been escorting the pro-Ukrainian demonstrators dispersed the crowd. Thirty activists from both groups were temporarily detained as a result. The chief of the Kharkiv Oblast branch of the Ministry of Internal Affairs said on 28 June that about 200 policemen had been fired since March for having been "in violation of the law", with many of them having "separatist views". He also said that police intervention on 22 June had managed to "prevent slaughter", and that both Euromaidan and Anti-Maidan activists had been trying to "destabilize the situation". Furthermore, Kharkiv Oblast governor Ihor Baluta wrote on his Facebook page that 314 "active separatists" had been arrested in Kharkiv since 6 April. Another protest by about 300 Ukrainian unity activists took place on 22 July. They gathered outside the RSA building with European Union, NATO, and Ukrainian flags, and said that they wanted to prevent the war in the Donbas region from spreading to Kharkiv Oblast. They demanded that gatherings of separatists and communists within Kharkiv city be prohibited. An attempt was made to destroy an important bridge in the village of Hrushuvakha on 29 July. The bridge was not damaged in the attempt, but Kharkiv RSA said that there were other plots to carry out "terrorist attacks" in Kharkiv Oblast.

The mayor of Kharkiv, Hennadiy Kernes, granted freedom of the city to two Russian citizens at a session of the Kharkiv City Council on 6 August. This concerned some people in the city, causing about one hundred people to protest outside city administration building. Police restrained the protesters, who attempted to force their way into the building. Protesters and the police negotiated, and eventually five protesters were allowed into the city administration to voice their grievances. Kharkiv remained calm for the next few days, until 10 August. On that day, about 150 people gathered outside the city administration and demanded an end to the government military operation in the Donbas region. A counter-protest was also held, with about 300 people voicing their support for the government military opposition, calling for the dissolution of the city administration, and the dismissal of the mayor. About one-hundred anti-Maidan-affiliated demonstrators gathered on Freedom Square to protest against corruption in Ukraine on 17 August. One of the speakers at the protest said that the best way to fight corruption was to create a "local regional government", as they said this would eliminate the need to bribe the ministers in Kyiv. A concurrent protest in the same square saw 250 pro-Euromaidan demonstrators voice their support for lustration and against oligarchy. The pro-Euromaidan demonstrators also collected money for the Armed Forces of Ukraine, and for refugees fleeing the war in Donbas. A Kharkiv court decision banned a planned 23 August joint rally of the Communist Party of Ukraine and the organization "South-East". "South-East" itself was banned on 20 August because it was deemed to be "a threat to the sovereignty of Ukraine and the security of its people" by a Kharkiv court. About 500 people marched on 23 August in commemoration of the Day of the National Flag and the European Day of Remembrance for Victims of Stalinism and Nazism; one of their demands was the dissolution of the city administration. A peaceful gathering of Ukrainian unity activists was held outside the Russian consulate in Kharkiv on 28 August. Around 400 people attended the demonstration. Participants said they were concerned about Russia's intervention in the war in Donbas. The demonstration was later dispersed by the police after stun grenades were thrown at the consulate.

One of the largest gatherings of supporters of Ukrainian unity in many months took place in Kharkiv on 28 September. At about 14:30, a diverse crowd of 2,000 people met in front of the Opera House. The demonstration was led by the Azov paramilitary battalion. The crowd then marched to Freedom Square, where there was a monumental statue of Vladimir Lenin. The statue had been a rallying point for pro-Russian protesters earlier in the year. By this time, the crowd had reached 5,000 people. The statue of Lenin was pulled down by the pro-Ukrainian demonstrators at 22:40, shortly after oblast governor Ihor Baluta signed an order to dismantle the statue. In late October, Governor Baluta admitted that he thought that the majority of the city's residents had not wanted the statue removed but said, "There was hardly any protest afterward either, which is quite telling."

From early November until mid-December, Kharkiv was struck by seven non-lethal bomb blasts. Targets of these attacks included a rock pub known for raising money for Ukrainian forces, a hospital for Ukrainian forces, a military recruiting centre, and a National Guard base. According to SBU investigator Vasyliy Vovk, Russian covert forces were behind the attacks and had intended to destabilize the otherwise calm city of Kharkiv.

=== Odesa Oblast ===
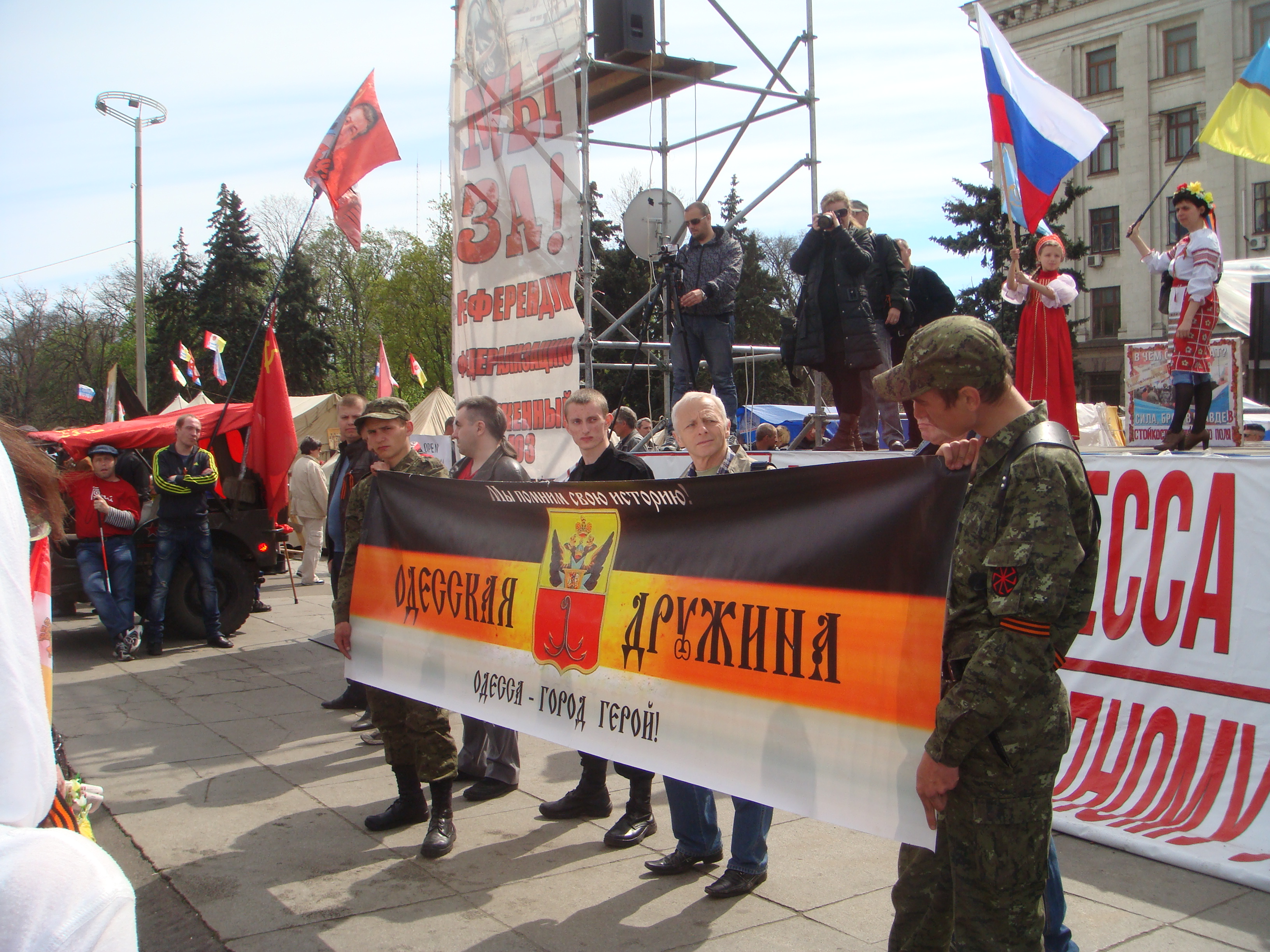
Pro-Russian Odesskaya Druzhina militants at a rally in Odesa, 20 April 2014.

Pro-Ukrainian demonstration in Odesa, 2 March.

Beginning on 1 March, demonstrations began in Odesa Oblast. Police reported that 5,000 participated in a pro-Russian demonstration in the city of Odesa on that day.

Rolling demonstrations continued, and on 3 March 2014, 200–500 demonstrators with Russian flags attempted to seize the Odesa Regional State Administration building. They demanded that a referendum on the establishment of an "Odesa Autonomous Republic" be held.

An 'Odesa People's Republic' was allegedly proclaimed by an internet group in Odesa Oblast on 16 April. Members of the Odesa anti-Maidan protest group later swore that they made no such declaration, and the leaders of the group said they had only heard about it through the media. The OSCE monitoring mission in Ukraine later confirmed that the situation in Odesa remained calm.

Local anti-Maidan and pro-Euromaidan leaders in Odesa Oblast voiced scepticism about the Geneva Statement on Ukraine on 20 April. The anti-Maidan leaders insisted that they aimed not at secession, but at the establishment of a wider federated state called 'Novorossiya' within Ukraine.

A hand grenade was thrown from a passing car at a joint police-Maidan self-defence checkpoint outside Odesa on 25 April, injuring seven people and causing heightened tensions in the region.

==== City centre clashes and further events ====
A week later, on 2 May, a rally by about 2,000 pro-government demonstrators, including football ultras, was attacked by about 300 anti-Maidan militants with batons and helmets. Both sides clashed in the streets of central Odesa, building barricades, throwing petrol bombs, and firing automatic weapons at each other.

The anti-Maidan protesters were later overwhelmed by the much larger group of Ukrainian unity protesters, forcing them to retreat to and occupy the Trade Unions House. From the building, militants on the roof shot at, tossed rocks and petrol bombs at the protesters below, who responded in kind with petrol bombs of their own. The building then caught fire. In total, 43 people died during the clashes. Thirty-one died whilst trapped in the burning Trade Unions House. Police said at least three people were shot dead.

In the aftermath of the clashes, on 4 May, the main Internal Affairs Ministry office in Odesa was attacked by pro-Russian protesters. They demanded the release of their "comrades" who had participated in the clashes. The police complied, resulting in the freeing of 67 of those arrested. By 5 May, the situation in Odesa had calmed, though the atmosphere remained extremely tense.

About sixty people gathered on Kulikovo Field to commemorate the 2 May fire on 13 July. The demonstration was peaceful. Another demonstration on the field on the same day drew about 120 people. They chanted, "Donbas, we are with you" in reference to the ongoing War in Donbas. Odesa city mayor Hennadiy Trukhanov told OSCE monitors on 23 July that the "underlying tensions" of the 2 May clashes remained in the city and that he feared for the city's security.

Odesa was struck by six bomb blasts in December 2014, one of which killed one person (the injuries sustained by the victim indicated that he had dealt with explosives). Internal Affairs Ministry advisor Zorian Shkiryak said on 25 December that Odesa and Kharkiv had become "cities which are being used to escalate tensions" in Ukraine.and that their geographic position was a reason.

The Security Service of Ukraine claims that in April 2015 it prevented the proclamation of a so-called "Bessarabian People's Republic". According to the security service, the separatist network behind it also wanted to set up an "Odesa People's Republic", "Porto-Franko", and other breakaway entities.

== Largest protests by date and attendance ==
The charts below show the locations, dates, and attendance rate of pro-Russian protests in Ukraine, and also of pro-Ukrainian counter-protests.

=== Pro-Russian protests ===
City	Peak attendees	Date	References
Dnipropetrovsk	1,000–3,000	1 Mar	
Donetsk	2,000–15,000	6 Apr	
Kerch	200	24 Feb	
Kharkiv	10,000	1 Mar 17 Mar	
Kherson	400	2 Mar	
Luhansk	10,000	9 Mar	
Mariupol	2,000–5,000	1 Mar	
Mykolaiv	1,000	2 Mar	
Odesa	5,000 (1 Mar), 500–700–1,000 (3 Mar), 3,000 (30 Mar)	1 Mar 3 Mar, 30 Mar	
Simferopol	5,000	26 Feb	
Sevastopol	15,000–25,000	23 Feb	
Zaporizhzhia	500–5,000+	6 Apr	

=== Pro-Ukrainian counter-protests ===
Protests by region	City	Peak attendees	Date	References
	Chernihiv	2,000+	2 Mar	
	Dnipropetrovsk	10,000	2 Mar	
	Donetsk	5,000–7,000	17 Apr	
	Kharkiv	7,000	23 Apr	
	Kherson	300	22 Mar	
	Kirovohrad	100	9 Mar	
	Kramatorsk	200	30 Mar	
	Kramatorsk	1,000	17 Apr	
	Kryvyi Rih	10,000+	19 Apr	
	Kyiv	8,000	2 Mar	
	Luhansk	1,000	13 Apr	
	Mariupol	1,000+	23 Apr	
	Mykolaiv	5,000–10,000	2 Mar	
	Odesa	10,000–15,000	30 Mar	
	Poltava	1,000+	2 Mar	
	Sevastopol	300+	9 Mar	
	Simferopol	10,000	26 Feb	
	Sumy	10,000+	2 Mar	
	Zaporizhzhia	5,000+	2 Mar	
	Zhytomyr	2,000	2 Mar	
Pro-Ukrainian protest sites: 10,000+ 5,000+ 1,000+ 500+ <500

== List of proclaimed breakaway states ==
Various breakaway states were proclaimed during the unrest.

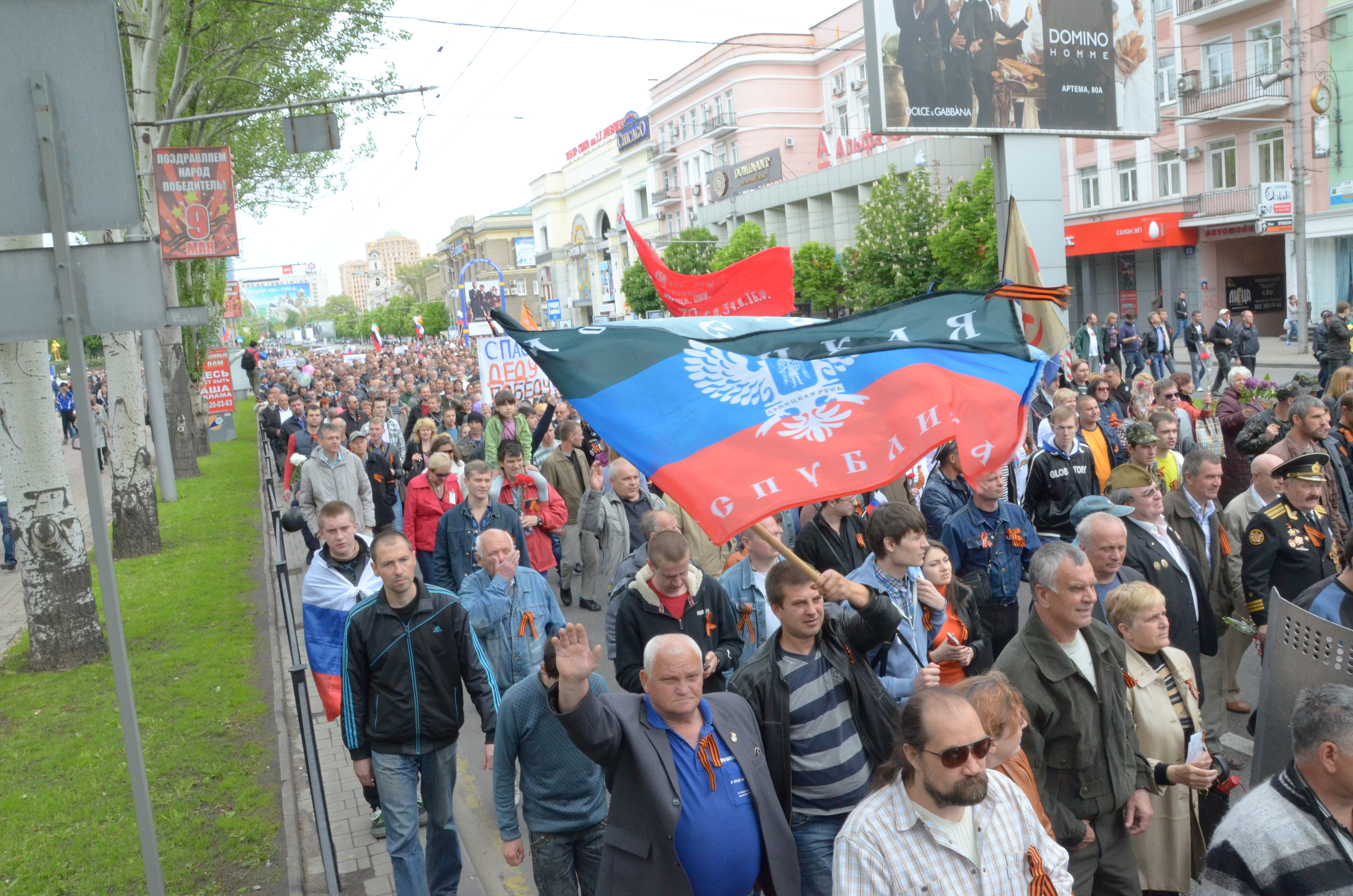
Rally of supporters of the Donetsk People's Republic on occasion of Victory Day held in Donetsk, 9 May 2014

=== Extant ===
- Donetsk People's Republic – Proclaimed by protestors on 7 April, with calls for Russia to send "peacekeepers" into Ukraine. Gunmen from Russia seized the interior ministry headquarters and two other police stations in Donetsk Oblast, occupying the transportation hub of Sloviansk, and starting a military conflict on 12 April. Russian nationalists and Eurasianists gained control of the organization, and hastily organized an 11 May referendum on independence.
- Luhansk People's Republic – The successor to the failed Luhansk Parliamentary Republic, proclaimed on 27 April. Activists occupied the SBU building in Luhansk from 8 April and gained control of the city council, prosecutor's office, and police station by 27 April. The regional administration announced its support for a referendum, and granted the governorship to separatist leader Valeriy Bolotov. Like Donetsk, a referendum on the status of the region took place on 11 May.
- (Republic of Crimea (Russia)) Republic of Crimea – Proclaimed on 16 March. After a disputed referendum on the political status of Crimea held on 16 March 2014, the Russian Federation annexed the Republic and split it back into the federal city of Sevastopol and the federal subject of the Republic of Crimea.

=== Failed proposals ===
- Kharkov People's Republic – The Kharkov People's Republic was proclaimed on 7 April by a small group of pro-Russian separatists occupying the RSA building with Yevhen Zhylin as president. However, later that day, Ukrainian special forces retook the building, thereby ending the "Republic".
- Odessa People's Republic – This republic was declared by an internet group on the Antimaidan website on 16 April, but local Antimaidan protesters said they had not made such a declaration. Unlike in Kharkiv, Donetsk, and Luhansk, pro-Russian protesters in Odesa said they wanted Odesa to be an autonomous region within Ukraine, rather than to join Russia. On 28 October, the SBU said they had foiled a plot to create a 'People's Republic' in the region. They found a munitions cache and arrested members of an alleged separatist group. They also said that Russian intelligence and security services were behind the plot.
- Novorossiya – In May 2014, the New Russia Party announced their plans to seize the southeastern oblasts of Ukraine, namely Kharkiv, Kherson, Dnipropetrovsk, Mykolaiv, Zaporizhzhia, and Odesa, and combine them into an independent, pro-Russian state known as New Russia (Russian: Новороссия, romanized: Novorossiya). After February 2015, the status of Novorossiya was unclear. Former DPR prime minister Alexander Borodai said on 1 January 2015 that "there is no Novorossiya", and that the proposed confederation was "an idea, a dream" "that wasn't brought to life". However, the Parliament of Novorossiya, chaired by Oleg Tsarov, continued to function as an office for political advancement, and was involved in the coordination of humanitarian assistance on 2 February 2015. The armed forces of the two People's Republics were combined in the United Armed Forces of Novorossiya, and the war flag of Novorossiya ( (Novorossiya (confederation)) ) remained in widespread usage. On 20 May 2015, the separatist leaders announced the termination of the confederation "project".

== International response ==
Various international entities warned all sides to reduce tensions in Eastern and Southern Ukraine.

- Armenia – In late March, Armenian President Serj Sargsyan and Russian President Vladimir Putin held a phone conversation where both men stated that the Crimean referendum constituted a case of people exercising their right to self-determination via the free expression of will. At the same time, the presidents highlighted the importance of commitment to the norms and principles of international law, especially the UN Charter.
- Australia – On 2 March, Prime Minister Tony Abbott said that Russia's actions in Ukraine were "not the kind... of a friend, and neighbour and I think Russia should back off." The Prime Minister told the Australian House of Representatives on 3 March that "Russia should back off, it should withdraw its forces from Ukraine, and people of Ukraine ought to be able to determine their future themselves", with the Australian government cancelling a planned visit to Russia by the Trade Minister Andrew Robb.
- Canada – On 28 Feb, Foreign Minister Baird "emphasized the need to honour the 1994 Budapest Declaration's commitment to Ukraine's territorial sovereignty and national unity". On a 1 March phone call, President Obama and Prime Minister Harper "affirmed the importance of unity within the international community in support of international law and the future of Ukraine and its democracy." Harper condemned Russia's military intervention in Ukraine; he announced that Canada had both recalled its ambassador to Russia and withdrawn from the 40th G8 summit, which was to be chaired by Russia. On 3 March, the House of Commons passed a unanimous motion condemning Russia's intervention in Crimea. Harper called Russia's actions an "invasion and occupation", and Baird compared them to Nazi Germany's occupation of the Sudetenland in 1938. Canada suspended all military cooperation with Russia, and asked Russian military servicemen (at least nine) to leave its territory in 24 hours.
- China – China said "We respect the independence, sovereignty, and territorial integrity of Ukraine." A spokesman restated China's belief of non-interference in the internal affairs of other states and urged dialogue.
- European Union – On 1 March, High Representative of the Union for Foreign Affairs and Security Policy Catherine Ashton stated that the EU "deplores" what it called Russia's decision to use military action in Ukraine, describing it as an "unwarranted escalation of tensions." She called on "all sides to decrease the tensions immediately through dialogue in full respect of Ukrainian and international law." She added that: the unity, sovereignty, and territorial integrity of Ukraine must be respected at all times and by all sides. Any violation of these principles, is unacceptable. More than ever, restraint and sense of responsibility are needed."
- Germany – In response to the detention of the German-led international military verification mission, Foreign Minister Frank-Walter Steinmeier stated: "The public parading of the OSCE observers and Ukrainian security forces as prisoners is revolting and blatantly hurts the dignity of the victims." Steinmeier also said: "Only when the guns fall silent, only on the basis of a robust ceasefire, are negotiations on resolving the crisis imaginable".
- Hungary – In the context of the unrest, Prime Minister Viktor Orbán said that ethnic Hungarians living in western Ukraine "must be granted dual citizenship, must enjoy all of the community rights, and must be granted the opportunity for autonomy".
- India – National Security Advisor Shivshankar Menon of India stated that Russia has legitimate interests in Crimea and called for "sustained diplomatic efforts" and "constructive dialogue" to resolve the crisis. However, the National Security Advisor is not a part of the Cabinet of India, and as such, Menon's statement was not an official statement issued by the government of India. India subsequently made it clear that it will not support any "unilateral measures" against the Russian government. "India has never supported unilateral sanctions against any country. Therefore, we will also not support any unilateral measures by a country or a group of countries."
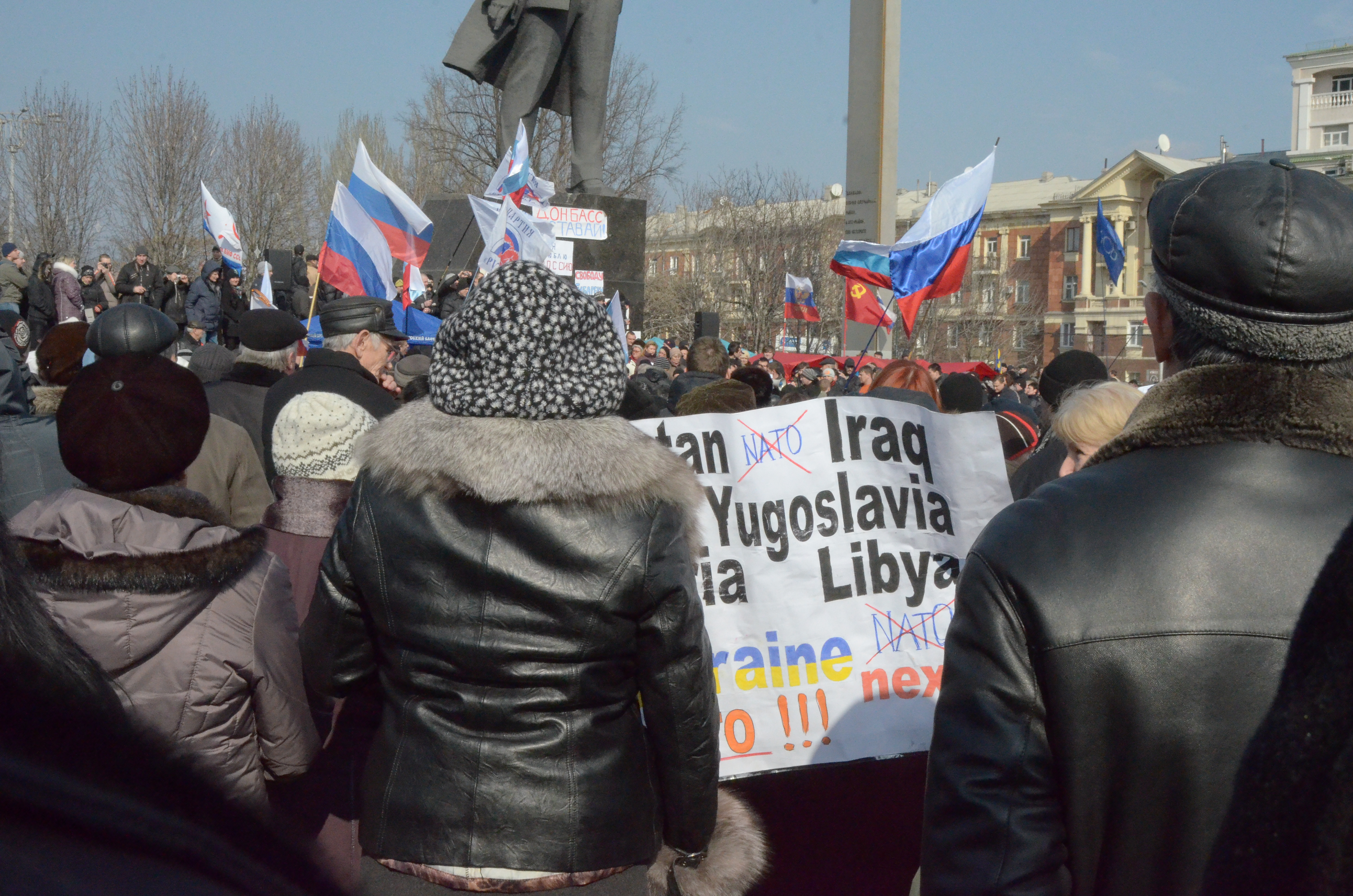
  Against NATO involvement in Ukraine. Donetsk, 9 March 2014
- Italy – Italian Prime Minister Matteo Renzi accused Putin of having committed "an unacceptable violation". On 19 March, during a speech in the Chamber of Deputies, Renzi stated that the Crimean status referendum was illegal and that the G8 countries must start cooperating to solve the crisis and prevent a return to the Cold War.
- North Atlantic Treaty Organization – On 2 March, Secretary General Anders Fogh Rasmussen convened the North Atlantic Council due to what it called Russia's military action and President Vladimir Putin's alleged threats against Ukraine.
- Organization for Security and Co-operation in Europe – OSCE chairman-in-office Didier Burkhalter condemned the detention of military inspectors from OSCE participating states in Sloviansk and requested that they be released. Burkhalter emphasized that the detention of the unarmed military inspectors was "unacceptable" and that "the safety of all international observers in the country must be guaranteed and ensured." This incident, he said, "goes against the spirit of the recent Geneva Statement agreed upon by Ukraine, the Russian Federation, the United States, and the European Union, aiming at de-escalating the situation and leading the way out of the challenging situation". Burkhalter asked involved parties "to resolve the crisis in Ukraine through inclusive dialogue." In response to escalation across Ukraine on 2 May, OSCE Chief Monitor Ertugrul Apakan called for "all sides to exercise maximum restraint and to avoid bloodshed and solve their differences peacefully." Apakan said, "There is a need for de-escalation...the Special Monitoring Mission is here to promote this objective. We are here for the people of Ukraine."
- Poland – Defence Minister Tomasz Siemoniak said that the events in Ukraine "have the features of a situation of war".
- Romania – A harsh exchange of words between officials in Moscow and Bucharest erupted in the context of the Ukrainian crisis. Dmitry Rogozin, deputy prime minister of the Russian government and one of the senior Russian officials sanctioned by the European Union and the United States, stated on a social networking website that "upon the U.S. request, Romania has closed its airspace for my plane. Ukraine doesn't allow me to pass through again. Next time I'll fly on board TU-160." Rogozin's statements have irritated the authorities in Bucharest that catalogued them as a threat.
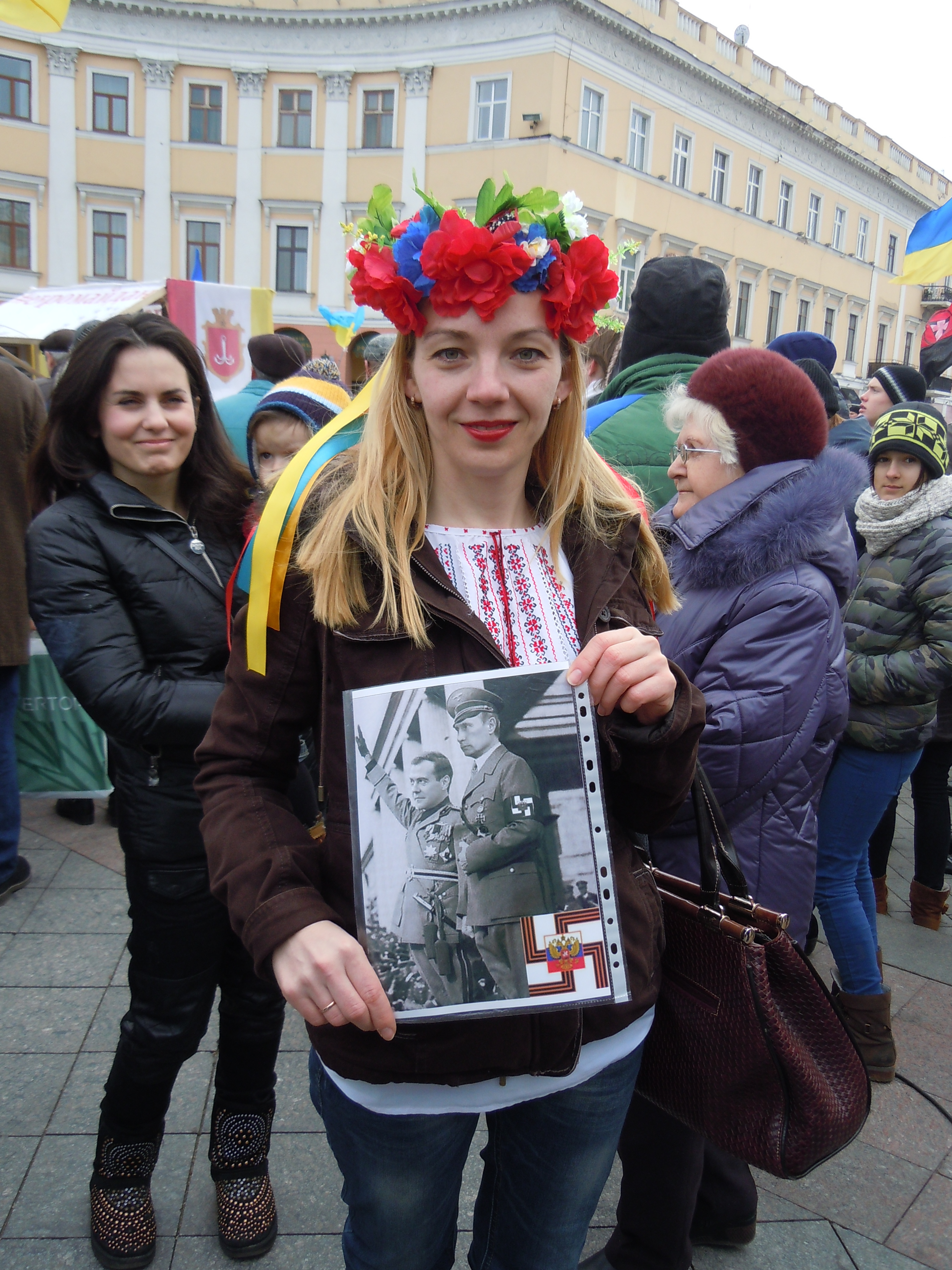
  Protester against the Russian government holding an image portraying Vladimir Putin and Dmitri Medvedev as Nazis with a swastika made of colours of the Ribbon of Saint George and a Russian coat of arms in the centre, Odesa
- Russian Federation – The Russian Foreign Ministry stated in an 8 April 2014 statement on its official website, "We are calling for the immediate cessation of any military preparations, which could lead to civil war". The ministry alleged that what it called "American experts from the private military organization Greystone" disguised as soldiers, as well as militants from the Ukrainian far-right group Right Sector, had joined Ukrainian forces preparing for the crackdown in eastern Ukraine. In a 7 April opinion piece in The Guardian, Russian foreign minister Sergei Lavrov wrote it was the EU and US, and not Russia, that was guilty of destabilizing Ukraine ("the EU and US have been trying to compel Ukraine to make a painful choice between east and west, further aggravating internal differences") and that "Russia is doing all it can to promote early stabilisation in Ukraine." Russian president Vladimir Putin did not send his regards to Ukrainian president Petro Poroshenko for the Independence Day of Ukraine celebration on 24 August, despite the fact that Poroshenko had sent his regards to Putin for Russia Day on 12 June. Putin also said: "What are the so-called European values? Maintaining the coup, the armed seizure of power, and the suppression of dissent with the help of the armed forces?"
- Ukraine – Acting President Olexander Turchynov said on 30 April "I would like to say frankly that at the moment the security structures are unable to swiftly take the situation in the Donetsk and Luhansk regions back under control", and that security forces "tasked with the protection of citizens" were "helpless". On 7 April an "anti-terrorist" operation against militants was started in the Luhansk and Donetsk self-proclaimed republics.
- United Kingdom – In response to the Russian government's declared outrage over a Ukrainian counteroffensive on Sloviansk, British Ambassador to the United Nations Sir Mark Lyall Grant said, "The scale of Russian hypocrisy is breathtaking...Russia's synthetic indignation over Ukraine's proportionate and measured actions convinces no one".
- United Nations – UN Secretary-General Ban Ki-moon condemned the violence that occurred in Eastern Ukraine over the weekend of 14–16 March and urged all parties "to refrain from violence and to commit themselves to de-escalation and inclusive national dialogue in the pursuit of a political and diplomatic solution."
- United States – US Secretary of State John Kerry stated (on 7 April 2014) that he thought the conflict in Kharkiv, Donetsk, Luhansk, and Mariupol was a carefully orchestrated campaign with Russian support. Assistant US Secretary of State Victoria Nuland said that the United States had no doubt that Russians were behind the takeovers of government buildings in eastern Ukraine. Geoffrey R. Pyatt, United States Ambassador to Ukraine, characterized the militants as terrorists. On 30 April, John Kerry stated that phone-tap evidence proved that the Kremlin was directing pro-Russian protests in the region. On Monday, 7 July, the governments of the United States and France urged Russian president Vladimir Putin to put pressure on pro-Russian insurgents in the Donetsk and Luhansk oblasts and to hold dialogue to reach a ceasefire with the Ukrainian government.

=== Sanctions ===
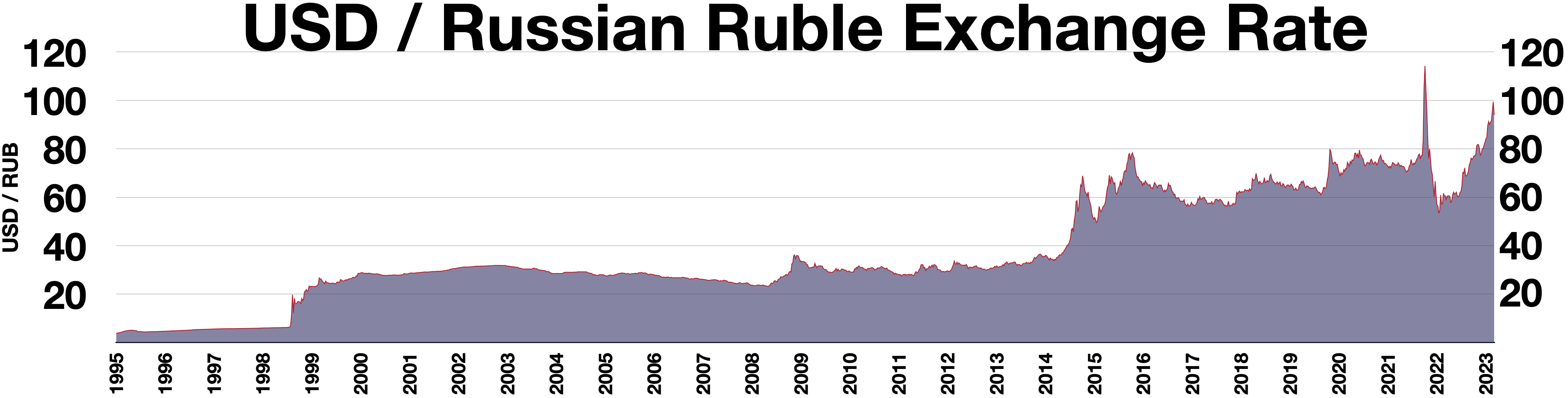
US Dollar / Russian Ruble exchange rate, 2001–2022 The Russian ruble lost a lot of value vs the USD during the conflict

During the course of the unrest, the United States, followed by the European Union, Canada, Norway, Switzerland, and Japan, began to sanction Russian individuals and companies that they said were related to the crisis. Announcing the first sanctions, the United States described some individuals targeted by sanctions, among them former Ukrainian president Yanukovych, as "threatening the peace, security, stability, sovereignty, or territorial integrity of Ukraine and for undermining Ukraine's democratic institutions and processes." The Russian government responded in kind with sanctions against some American and Canadian individuals. With the unrest continuing to escalate, the European Union and Canada imposed further sanctions in mid-May.

=== Geneva Statement on Ukraine ===
On 10 April, Ukraine, the United States, Russia, and the European Union agreed to hold a 17 April quadrilateral meeting in Geneva to try to negotiate an end to the crisis in Ukraine. The meeting produced a document, called the Geneva Statement on Ukraine, which stated that all sides agreed that steps should be taken to "de-escalate" the crisis. All four parties agreed that all "illegal military formations in Ukraine" must be dissolved and that everyone occupying buildings must be disarmed and leave but that there would be an amnesty for all anti-government protesters under the agreement. These steps will be overseen by monitors from the Organization for Security and Co-operation in Europe (OSCE). The sides also agreed that the Constitution of Ukraine is also to be revised in a process that is "inclusive, transparent, and accountable." The agreement put on hold additional economic sanctions against Russia by the United States and the European Union.

=== National unity talks ===
As part of an OSCE initiative to solve the crisis in Ukraine, national unity talks were held in Kyiv, starting from 14 May. Separatists from Donetsk and Luhansk were not represented, as the Ukrainian government said that "those armed people who are trying to wage a war on their own country, those who are with arms in their hands trying to dictate their will, or rather the will of another country, we will use legal procedures against them, and they will face justice." The OSCE said that Russian president Vladimir Putin supported its initiative. Concurrently, Russian Foreign Minister Sergei Lavrov said that the separatists should be included in the talks. Separatists from Kharkiv were indeed invited to attend, but they refused to participate.

=== Fifteen-point peace plan ===
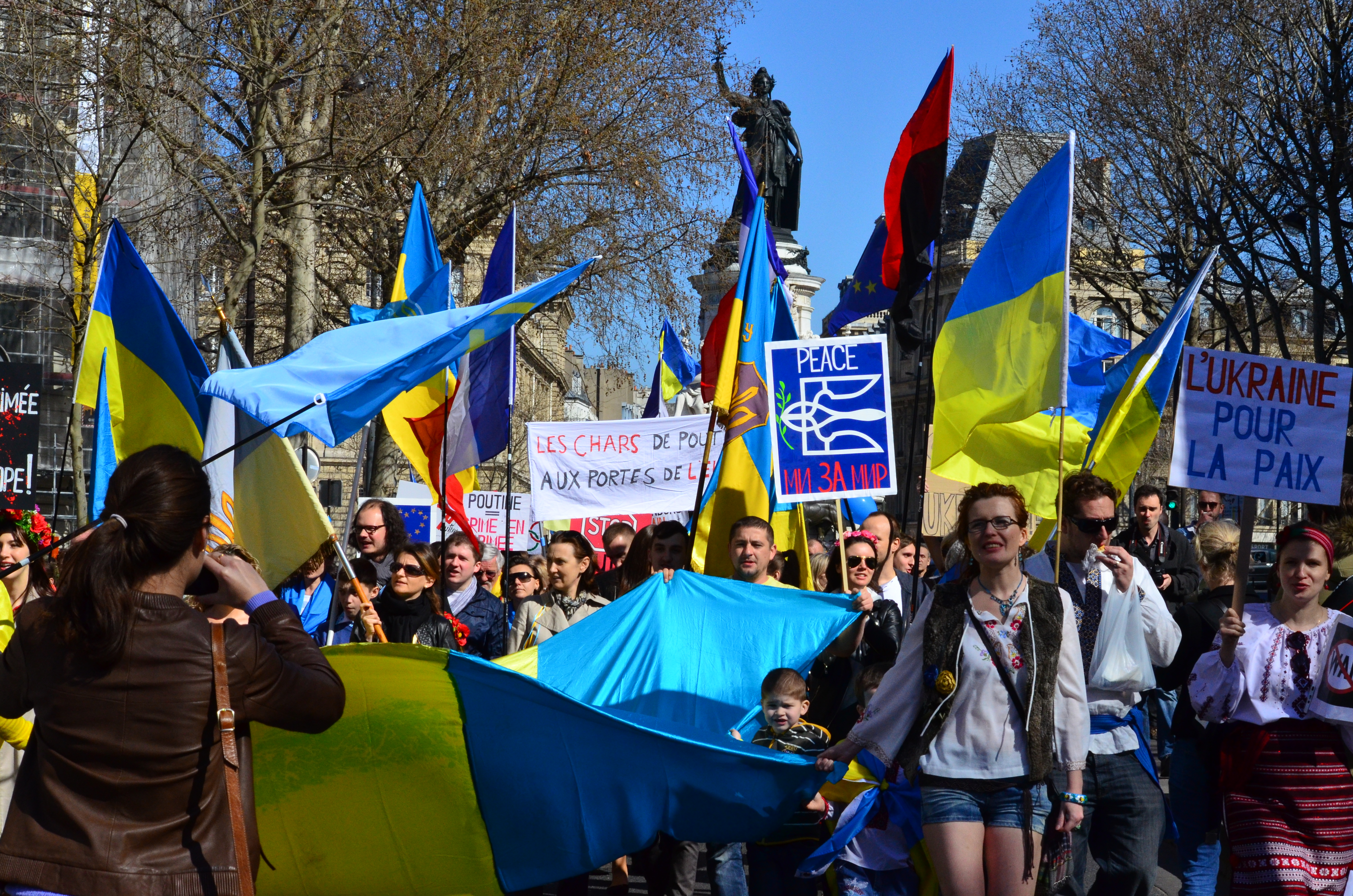
Demonstrators for peace in Ukraine, in Paris.

Ukrainian president Petro Poroshenko announced a fifteen-point plan for peace on 20 June. The plan called for a week-long ceasefire, starting on 20 June, for the separatists to vacate the buildings they've occupied, for decentralization of power from the central government in Kyiv, and for the protection of Russian-language rights. The full text of the fifteen points are as follows:

1. Security guarantees for all the participants of negotiations.
2. Amnesty for those who laid down weapons and didn't commit serious crimes.
3. Liberation of hostages.
4. Establishment of a 10-kilometre (6 1/4 mi) long buffer zone on the Ukrainian-Russian border. Withdrawal of illegal armed formations.
5. Secure corridor for the escape of Russian and Ukrainian mercenaries.
6. Disarmament.
7. Establishment of units for joint patrolling in the structure of the MIA.
8. Liberation of illegally seized administrative premises in Donetsk and Luhansk regions.
9. Restoration of functioning of local government.
10. Restoration of central television and radio broadcasting in Donetsk and Luhansk regions.
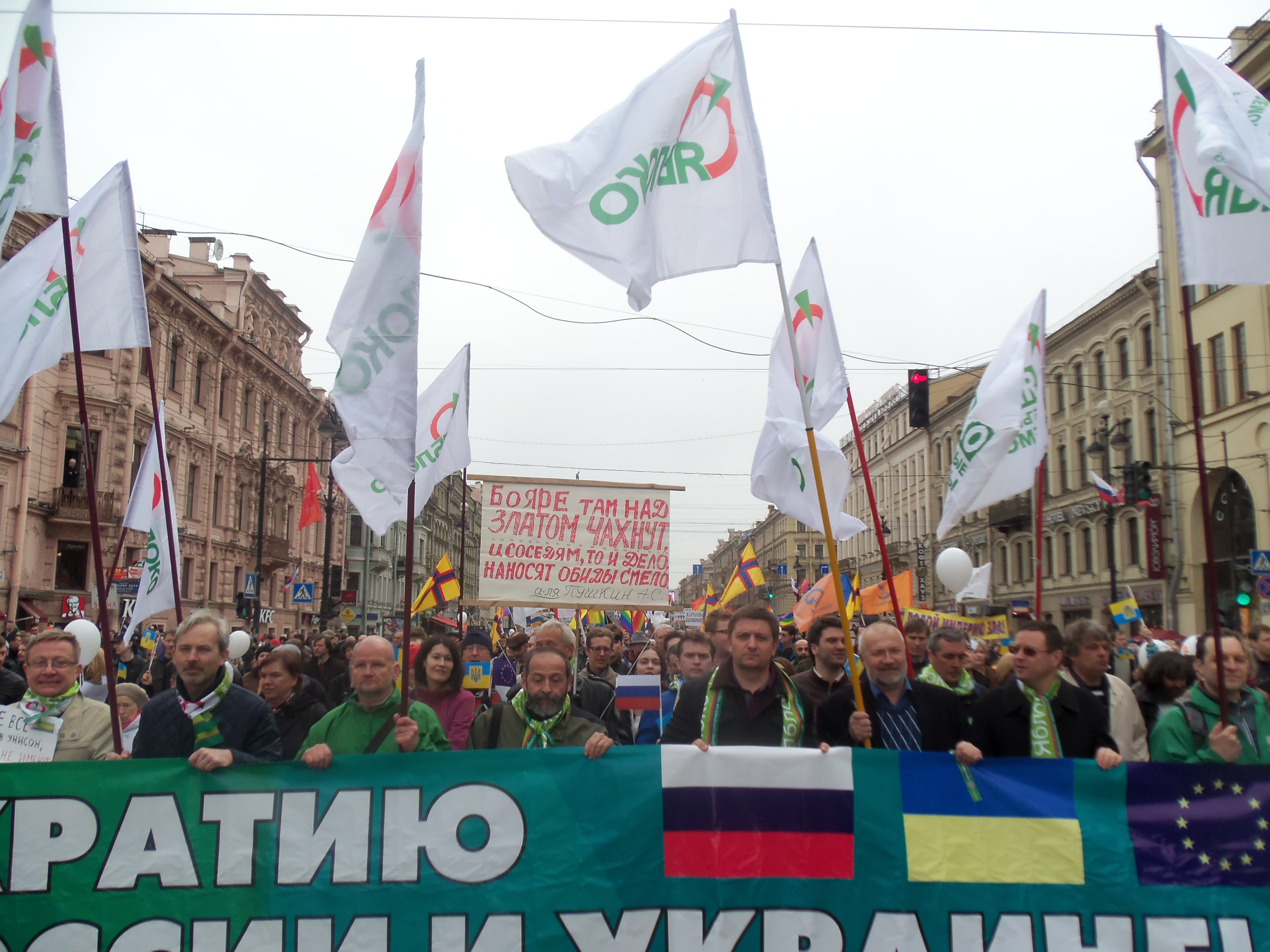
  Anti-war demonstration in St. Petersburg, 1 May 2014
11. Decentralization of power (through the election of executive committees, protection of the Russian language; draft amendments to the Constitution).
12. Coordination of governors with representatives of the Donbas before the elections
13. Early local and parliamentary elections.
14. Program for creating jobs in the region.
15. Restoration of social and industrial infrastructure.

Russian president Vladimir Putin offered some support for the plan but called for Poroshenko to bring the separatists into negotiations. Russian Foreign Minister Sergei Lavrov said that Poroshenko's peace plan "looks like an ultimatum". Poroshenko previously refused to enter into negotiations with armed separatists. OSCE monitors with the Special Monitoring Mission in Ukraine met with a representative of the Donetsk People's Republic on 21 June to discuss the peace plan. The representative said that the Republic would reject the ceasefir and said that the primary demands of the government of the Donetsk People's Republic were "withdrawal of Ukrainian forces from Donbas" and recognition of the Republic. However, after initial peace talks between the separatists, Ukrainian and Russian officials, and the OSCE in Donetsk on 23 June, Alexander Borodai, prime minister of the Donetsk People's Republic, said that his forces would hold to the ceasefire. Soon after this statement, separatists in Sloviansk shot down a Ukrainian Armed Forces Mi-8 helicopter, killing all those on board. The next day, the Office of the President of Ukraine issued a statement that said that the ceasefire had been violated by the insurgents at least thirty-five times. President Poroshenko also said that he was considering ending the ceasefire, and Borodai said that there was not an effective ceasefire.

Despite this, Poroshenko extended the ceasefire by three days from its planned ending on 27 June. In response to this action, protesters in Kyiv took the streets in large numbers to demand that the ceasefire be cancelled. The ceasefire had little actual impact on clashes between government and separatist forces, with at least five government soldiers killed during the ceasefire. By July, the peace plan had fallen by the wayside, and Poroshenko ended the ceasefire after both sides accused each other of repeated violations. After a rocket attack that killed nineteen Ukrainian troops, Poroshenko vowed to take revenge on the separatists: "Militants will pay hundreds of their lives for each life of our servicemen. Not a single terrorist will avoid responsibility."

== Participants ==
=== Activists and Russian security personnel ===
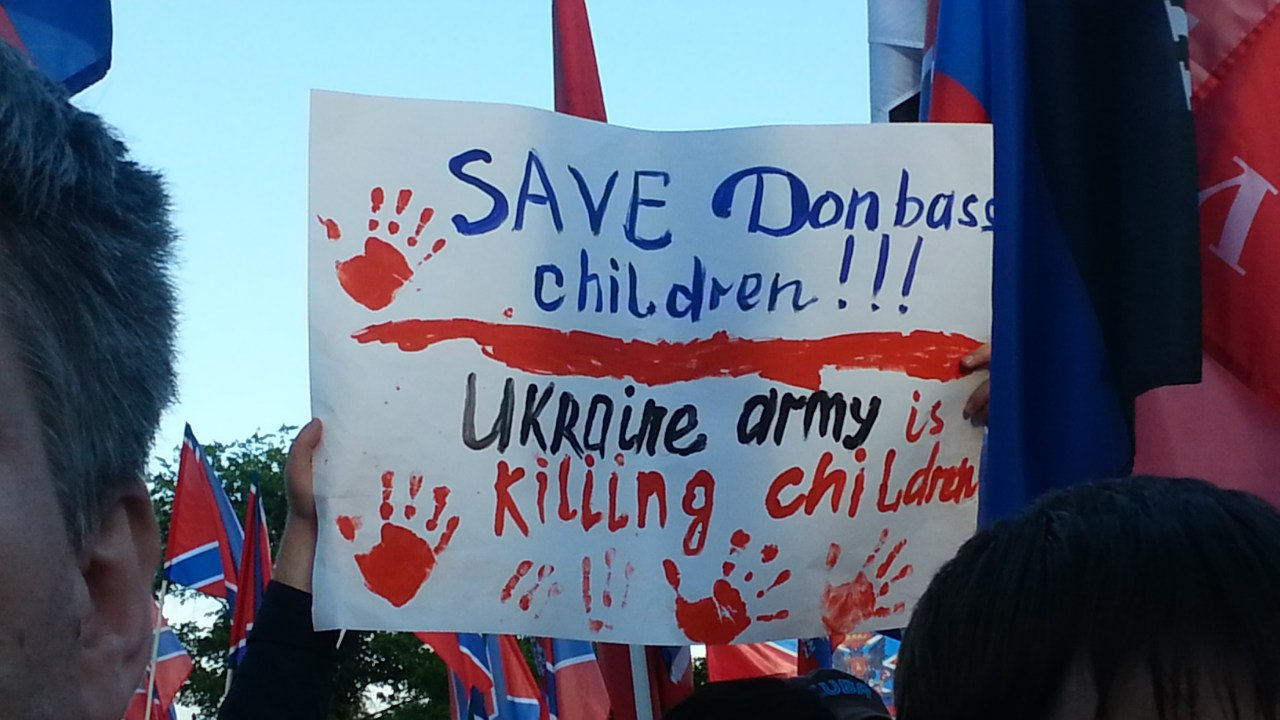
A rally in support of pro-Russian unrest in the eastern Ukraine, Moscow, 11 June 2014

- Igor Girkin (Russian security officer, leader of the armed group of Russian soldiers seizing Slavyansk)
- Pavel Gubarev (self-proclaimed 'People's Governor' of Donetsk)
- Robert Donya (self-proclaimed deputy 'People's Governor' of Donesk)
- Mikhail Chumachenko (leader of the self-styled 'Donbas People's Militia')
- Dmitry Kuzmenko (self-proclaimed 'People's Mayor' of Mariupol)
- Anton Davidchenko (leader of Odesa protest until March)
- Aleksandr Kharitonov (leader of 'Luhansk Guard' organization)
- Arsen Klinchaev (member of the Party of Regions, leader of separatists in Luhansk)
- Yuri Apukhtin (leader of the banned 'South-East' organization; Apukhtin is in detention, and his trial started late May 2015 in Kharkiv)

Former adviser to the President of Russia Vladimir Putin and a senior fellow at the Cato Institute in Washington, DC, Andrey Illarionov estimates that at least 2,000 Russian intelligence officials were operating in eastern Ukraine.

Ukrainian intelligence claims that it had a dossier on more than forty Russian military intelligence, or GRU, operatives arrested so far on Ukrainian soil and the weapons and ammunition seized after being transported across the border from Russia. The file was said to describe the role of an alleged GRU colonel, Igor Ivanovich Strielkov, who had been involved in agitation in the east, including his attempts to suborn Ukrainian soldiers with offers of cash. The Ukrainian Security Service put out a wanted poster for Strielkov, accusing him of a series of charges, including premeditated murder and organizing mass riots. Russia insisted that the allegations were false and that a Streilkov did not even exist or "at least not as a Russian operative sent to Ukraine with orders to stir up trouble".

CNN presented a video from a large separatist rally held in a central Donetsk city square around lunchtime on 26 May. Lorries in the square carried armed Chechen paramilitaries. Two told a CNN team they were from the Chechen capital, Grozny, and one indicated that he was formerly a policeman in Chechnya and was in Donetsk to serve the Russian Federation. Russian and Ukrainian media published numerous reports on bodies of separatists being transported secretly back to Russia, usually through Uspenka. A few names of the killed volunteers were established—Sergey Zhdanovich (Сергей Жданович), Yuri Abrosimov (Юрий Абросимов), Aleksey Yurin (Алексей Юрин), Alexandr Efremov (Александр Ефремов), and Evgeny Korolenko (Евгений Короленко). The bodies were transported to a Russian military base in Rostov-on-Don. Some of the families were able to get the bodies secretly returned to them. Most of the killed had past military experience. According to the journalists, Russian military commissariats (voyenkomat) in Rostov were actively recruiting volunteers for Donbas among former soldiers, especially with specific skills (ATGM, SAM, AGS-17) and those who had previously served in Chechnya and Afghanistan.

On 18 June Daniel Baer (OSCE) noted that "there continue to be fighters and arms coming across the border from Russia to Ukraine in recent days and weeks, and we don't see any efforts to turn it off by Russia".

=== Russian citizens ===
==== Alexander Dugin ====
On 29 March, Russian political scientist Aleksandr Dugin appeared in a leaked Skype video conference with Kateryna Gubareva, the wife of Donetsk-based separatist Pavel Gubarev. In the call, he reassured her of Moscow's support and further actions that should be taken by the movement. He also stated all presidential nominees should be considered 'traitors,' with only Yanukovych considered legitimate. He also said that separatists should "act in a radical way" and Moscow will later support civil war in Ukraine, saying, "The Kremlin is determined to fight for the independence of southeast Ukraine." Following the video's release, a member of Dugin's Eurasian Youth Union (Oleg Bakhtiyarov) was arrested on 31 March for planning terrorist acts in Ukraine.

=== Pro-government figures ===
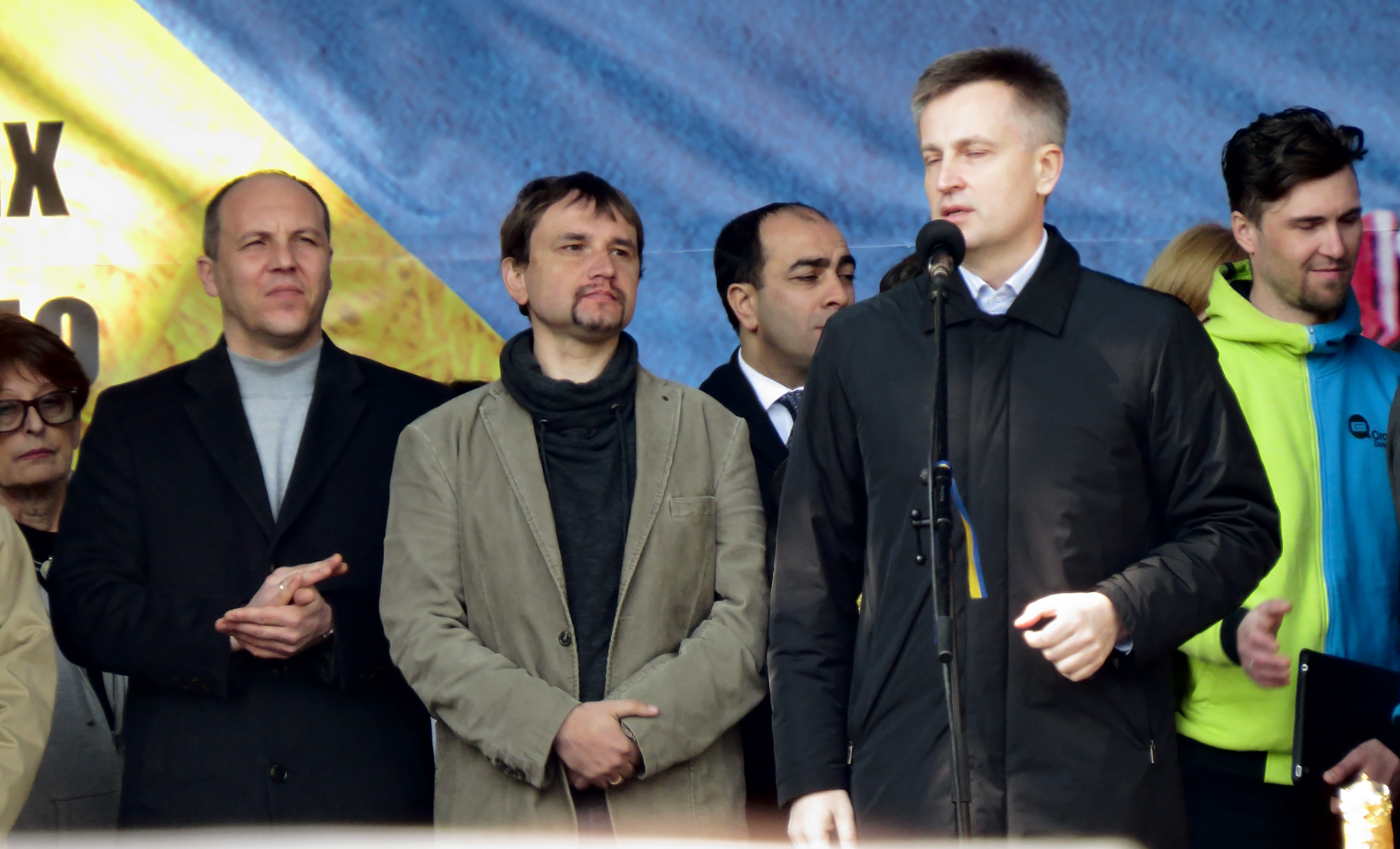
Valentyn Nalyvaichenko (speaking), the head of the Security Service of Ukraine (SBU), and Andriy Parubiy (far left), 23 March 2014

- Nadiya Savchenko (Ukrainian: Надія Савченко) is a Ukrainian ex-paratrooper and a helicopter navigator who was captured by the separatists as a member of Aydar battalion (at that time a paramilitary formation of the Ministry of Defense) near Luhansk. After being captured in June, the separatists published a video of her interrogation and held her hostage. Savchenko was the subject of a number of articles in Komsomolskaya Pravda by Nikolai Varsegov, who accused her of being a sniper and mass killer. In July, the Russian government officials said that Savchenko had "illegally crossed Russian border as refugee", was stopped by Russian police, and is faced with a trial for alleged assistance in the murder of two Russian journalists. Being finally allowed to see the Ukrainian consul, Savchenko said that she was transported to Russia against her will.
- Ukraine's National Security and Defence Council chief Andriy Parubiy oversaw the government military operation against pro-Russian separatists in eastern Ukraine. As part of the Budapest memorandum participants, Parubiy appealed for assistance from the United States as one of the signatories. He said, "The counterterrorist operation will go on regardless of any decisions by any subversive or terrorist groups in the Donetsk region". Parubiy also said, "The key tactic of Russian saboteurs is to capture a building, station an armed garrison there, and have a picket around, mostly Communists, who would provide a human shield." Parubiy resigned as National Security and Defence Council chief on 7 August 2014.
- Andriy Biletsky, the head of the Social-National Assembly and Patriots of Ukraine (perceived by some experts as the ultranationalist and neo-Nazi political groups), is commander of the Azov Battalion.

=== Other foreign participants ===
- Chechen, Abkhaz, Ossetian, and Cossack paramilitaries have been active participants in the insurgency in Donetsk and Luhansk oblasts. Some Chechen opponents of the Russian government were fighting against pro-Russian separatists in Ukraine for the Ukrainian government.
- The Security Service of Ukraine (SBU) released an audio recording on 5 May that they said was a phone call between a Donetsk separatist leader and the leader of the far-right paramilitary Russian National Unity group Alexander Barkashov. In the recording, the separatist said he wanted to postpone the referendum, due to the DPR's inability to control all of Donetsk Oblast. Barkashov said that he had communicated with Putin and insisted on holding the referendum regardless of the separatist leader's concerns. He instructed the separatists to tabulate the results as 89% in favour of autonomy. Separatists stated that the recording was fake.
- In a meeting held on 7 July in Donetsk City, Russian politician Sergey Kurginyan held a press conference with representatives of the Donbas People's Militia, including Pavel Gubarev, and said that Russia did provide significant military support for the separatists. During a discussion among the participants, Gubarev complained that the arms that had been sent were old and not fully functional. In response, Kurginyan listed specific items, including 12,000 automatic rifles, grenade launchers, 2S9 Nona self-propelled mortars, two BMPs, and three tanks, that he knew had been supplied to the separatists by Russia. He also said he saw new, fully functional weapons unloaded at locations in Donbas, which he would not "disclose as we are filmed by cameras." Kurginyan admitted that Russia had initially sent "4th category weapons" but since 3 June, had supplied equipment that was fully functional. He also said one of his goals, whilst in Donetsk, was to ensure that military support from Russia was increased. He repeated claims of a constant flow of military support provided by "the Russian community" into the conflict zone on 13 July.

=== OSCE monitors ===
Monitors from the Organization for Security and Co-operation in Europe (OSCE) were sent to Ukraine after a request by the Ukrainian government, and an agreement between all member states of the OSCE, including Russia. The Special Monitoring Mission (SMM) deployed on 6 April and has remained in Ukraine to "contribute to reducing tensions and fostering peace, stability, and security". The SMM lost contact with four monitors in Donetsk Oblast on 26 May, and another four in Luhansk Oblast on 29 May. Both groups were held in captivity by separatists for a month until being freed on 27 and 28 June, respectively.

=== Defectors ===
==== Ukrainian defectors to Russia ====
Throughout the conflict, there were reports of both police and military either deserting their posts or defecting to the separatists. Oleksandr Turchynov stated that numerous Ukrainian military and security personnel joined the separatists, alongside Ukrainian military equipment. A report by the Internal Affairs Ministry said that over 17,000 policemen had defected to insurgents in eastern Ukraine by 23 May.

==== Russian defectors to Ukraine ====
On 19 July, Ilya Bogdanov, a former Russian FSB lieutenant in Vladivostok, defected to Ukraine, claiming that he could no longer stand the lies used by Russia to stimulate the situation in Eastern Ukraine and Dagestan, where he served earlier. On 24 July, Russian army serviceman Andrej Balabanov asked for political asylum in Ukraine, stating, "I finally took a decision not to take part in this war and sided with Ukraine. This is my protest against Russia's political leaders." Balabanov claimed his unit had sent "military intelligence, GRU, experts, and Chechens" into Ukraine to help the separatists. He went on to claim his unit had been "continuously brainwashed into believing they would be sent to Ukraine to save their Russian-speaking brothers."

== Arrests ==
- On 3 April 2014, one man was arrested and eight more were put under house arrest on suspicion of involvement in the riots in Donetsk on 13 March, which led to the murder of Dmitry Cherniavsky.
- On 5 April, the SBU arrested a group of 15 people in Luhansk, along with 300 machine guns, one anti-tank grenade launcher, five pistols, petrol bombs, and a large amount of smooth-bore guns and other weapons. "The group planned to seize power in Luhansk on April 10 by intimidating civilians using weapons and explosives", the SBU press office told Interfax-Ukraine.
- In Kharkiv, anti-Maidan activist Ignat Kramskoy (nicknamed "Topaz") was placed under house arrest on 29 March for his alleged involvement in the 1 March raid on the Kharkiv Regional State Administration building. On 7 April, he escaped house arrest after cutting off his monitoring bracelet, and later gave interviews to the pro-Russian channel LifeNews about 'guerrilla struggle' and using firearms to capture buildings. Topaz was re-arrested as he set up another interview with Russia's Life News channel. He received an eight-year prison sentence in January 2018 but was released in September with credit for time served.
- On 12 April a saboteur known as "K" was arrested by the SBU in Kharkiv. He had been tasked with organizing riots and capturing administrative buildings. Later, 70 were arrested between the border of Poltava and Kharkiv. The men were travelling on a bus, and found in possession of explosives, petrol bombs, bats, shields, helmets, knives, and other weapons.
- On 25 April, the SBU announced it had arrested two Ukrainian military members recruited by Russian intelligence.
- On 29 April the SBU arrested Spartak Holovachov and Yuri Apukhtin, leader of the Great Rus' organization in Kharkiv. Authorities claimed they were organized from abroad to plan riots in the city on 9 May, and upon searching their headquarters found guns, grenades, ammunition, cash, and separatist leaflets.
- As of 19 April, the SBU had arrested 117 Russian citizens.
- V. Makarov, an alleged spy from the GRU, was arrested in Chernihiv on 20 March 2014.
- Anton Rayevsky was arrested in Odesa and then deported for inciting ethnic hatred and violence.
- Roman Bannykh, allegedly an agent of the Russian GRU, was detained on 5 April 2014.
- Negrienko was arrested earlier in March 2014 for attempting to recruit Ukrainian police officers.
- Oleg Bakhtiyarov, for allegedly planning to storm Ukraine's parliament and Cabinet of Ministers buildings in Kyiv by force. Bakhtiyarov, working under the guise of a civil society activist in Kyiv, had allegedly recruited some 200 people, paying them each $500, to assist in storming the buildings and had stockpiled petrol bombs and various tools to carry out the provocation. Bakhtiyarov allegedly also arranged, with some Russian TV channels, to film the incident, which would then have been blamed on Ukrainian radicals. Russian writer and the founder of the banned National Bolshevik Party, Eduard Limonov described Bakhtiyarov as "a good guy, a psychiatrist, a commando, a vet of the War of Transnistria, and a participant in the city hall seizure."
- Dmitry Kolesnikov, a member of The Other Russia, was arrested.
- Two Russian citizens were arrested in Lviv Oblast on 2 April 2014, suspected of plotting to take several Ukrainians hostage, including a presidential candidate. Police allegedly found a 200-gram TNT block, detonator, and 16 9×18mm Makarov rounds in one of the suspect's cars. Also allegedly found was a notebook with details of cars used by the presidential candidate and a timetable of his movements; a tablet with images of the targeted politician, as well as members of the Lviv Regional Council, one former MP, photos of houses belonging to them; and plans for gaining access to them.
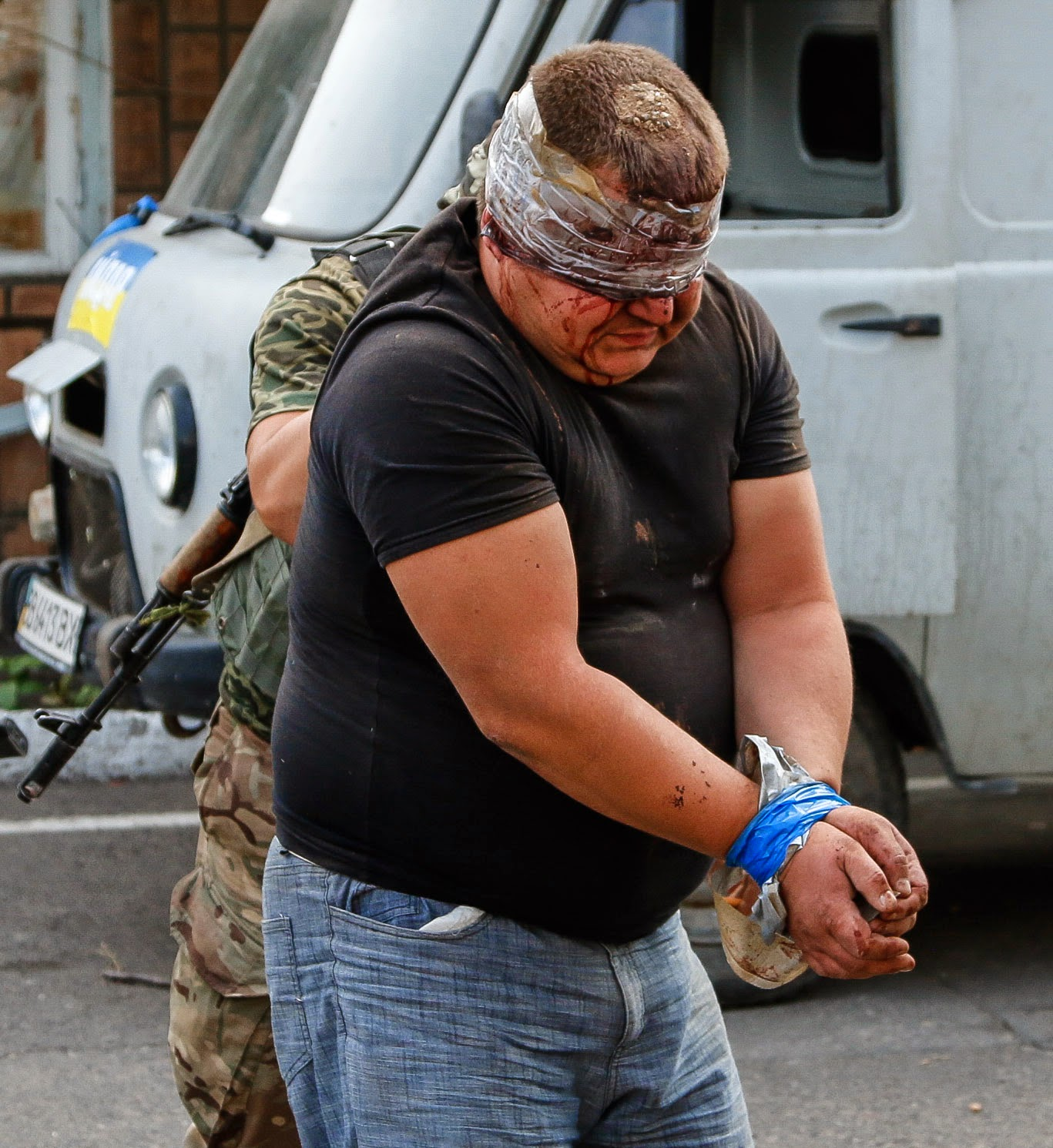
  Pro-separatist supporter detained by Ukrainian soldiers, 30 July 2014
- Mariya Koleda was arrested on 9 April 2014, and allegedly performed Russian intelligence agency tasks to destabilize the situation in the southern regions of Ukraine. On 7 April, she allegedly took part in fights at the Mykolaiv Oblast Regional State Administration building using a firearm, and confessed to shooting and wounding three people. "She also reported on the preparation of two subversive groups (7 persons from Kherson and 6 people from Nova Kakhovka) to participate in riots in Donetsk", reports the SSU.
- On 13 April, Ukraine arrested an alleged Russian GRU operative.
- On 22 April, Ukraine's director of Ukraine's national security service announced that they had arrested three alleged Russian GRU agents.
- On 1 May, border guards arrested a Russian citizen for planning separatist provocations in Luhansk. The man was allegedly a member of the neo-Nazi skinhead group 'Slavs' and had several swastika tattoos as well as a Nazi-branded knife.
- On 23 October, Ukraine arrested a man that they claimed was a high-level Russian intelligence agent who had been coordinating separatist activity and had organized the protest of several hundred National Guard troops outside the Ukrainian presidential administration building in Kyiv on 13 October.

=== Bounty ===
In April 2014, international billionaire and governor of Dnipropetrovsk, Igor Kolomoisky issued a $10,000 bounty for the apprehension of Russian agents. He also offered rewards for handing in weapons belonging to insurgents: $1,000 for each machine gun turned in to the authorities, $1,500 for every heavy machine gun, and $2,000 for a grenade launcher. On 19 April he issued his first $10,000 payout for the capture of a Russian saboteur. Media reported that at least one billboard existed with the following text: "$10,000 for a Moskal" (derogatory name for Russians). According to The Daily Beast, no such billboards existed, and the photo media referred to "was faked for the Internet."

== Gallery ==
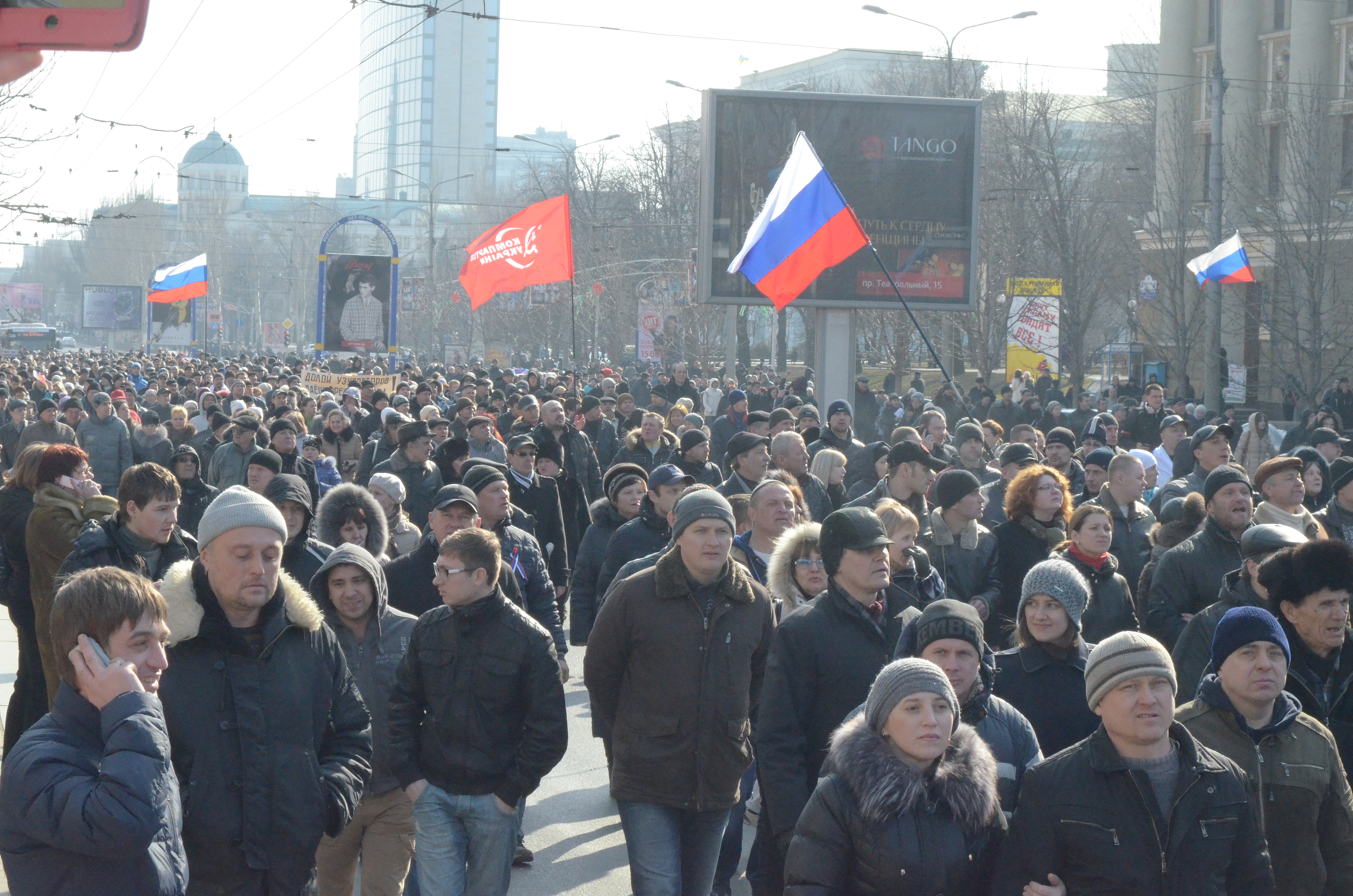
Pro-Russian demonstration in Donetsk, 9 March 2014.

Pro-Russian protesters in Donetsk, 1 March 2014.

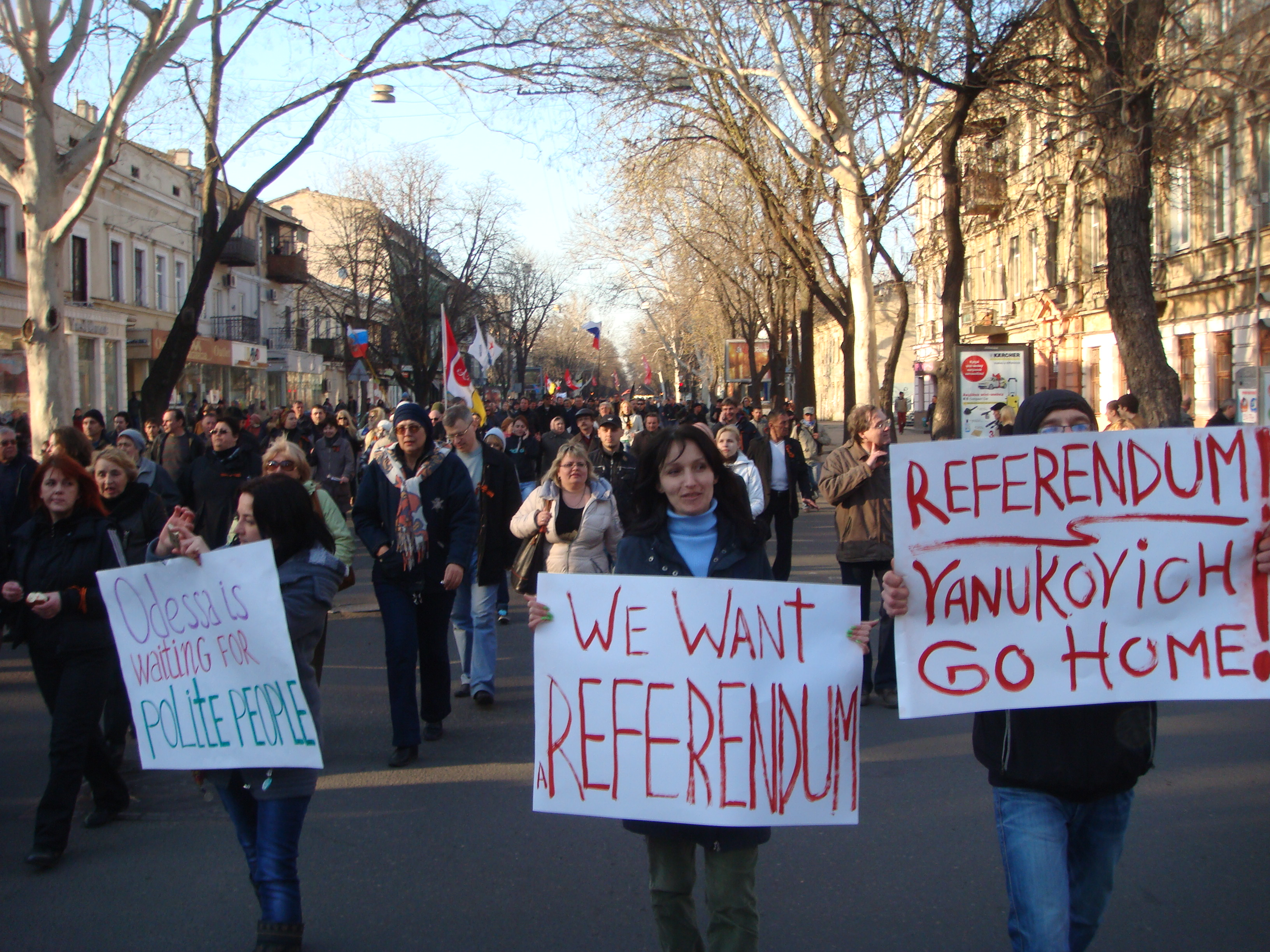
Pro-Russian protesters marching Odesa streets on 30 March 2014.

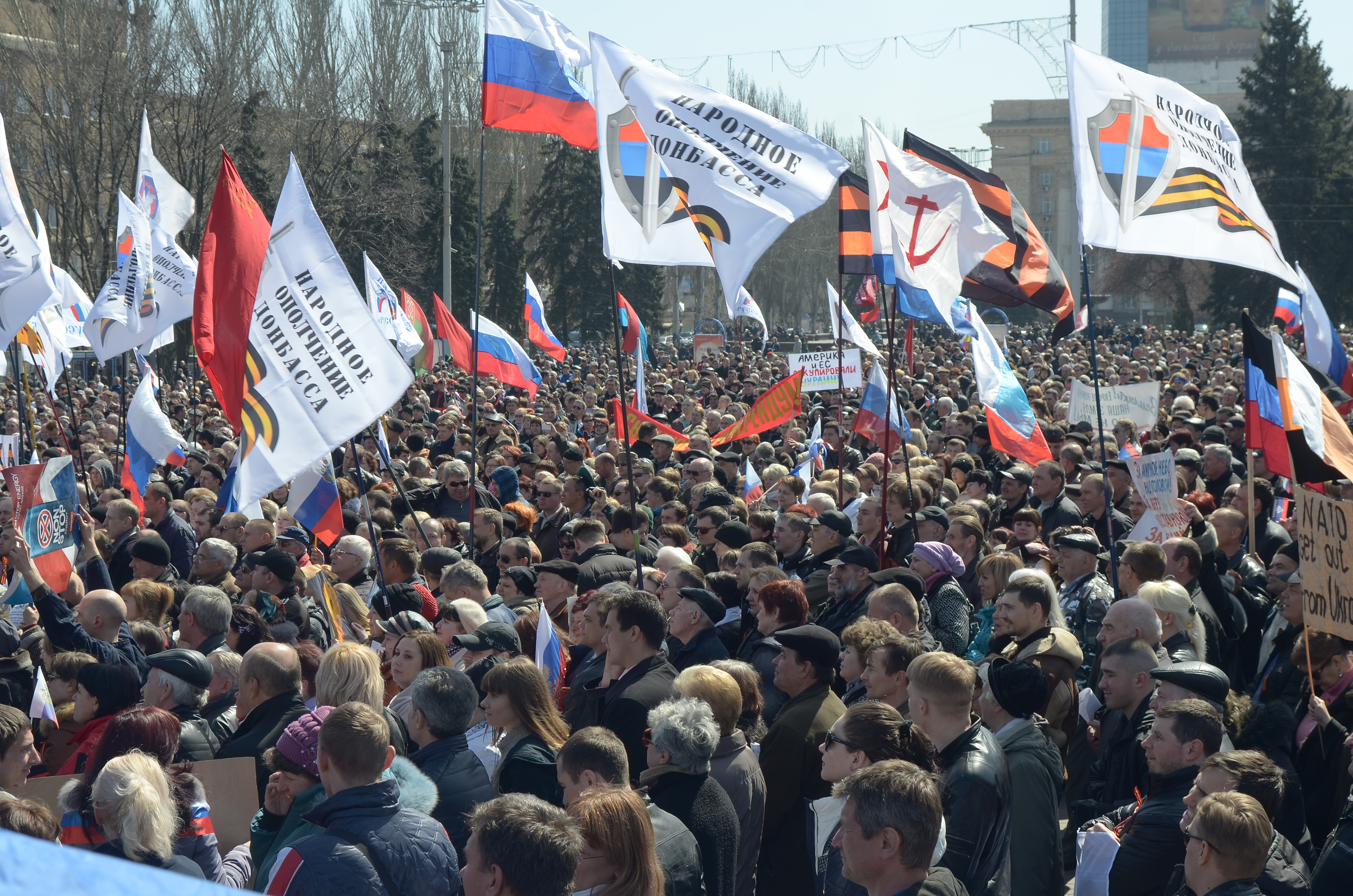
Pro-Russian protesters in Donetsk, 6 April 2014.

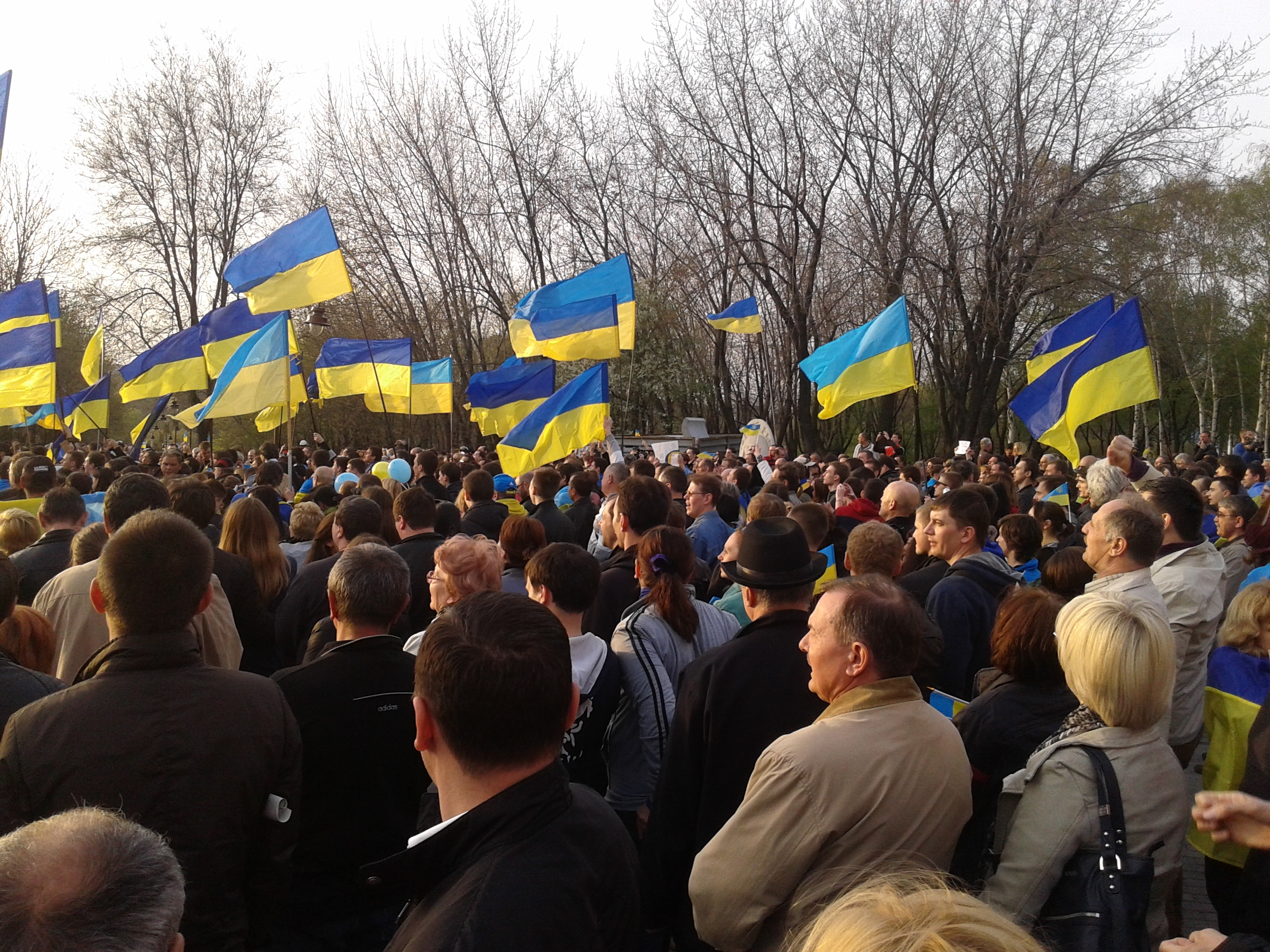
Demonstration in support of Ukrainian unity in Donetsk, 17 April 2014

Protest rally in Odesa against Russian President Vladimir "Putin's occupation actions in Ukraine", 2 March 2014.

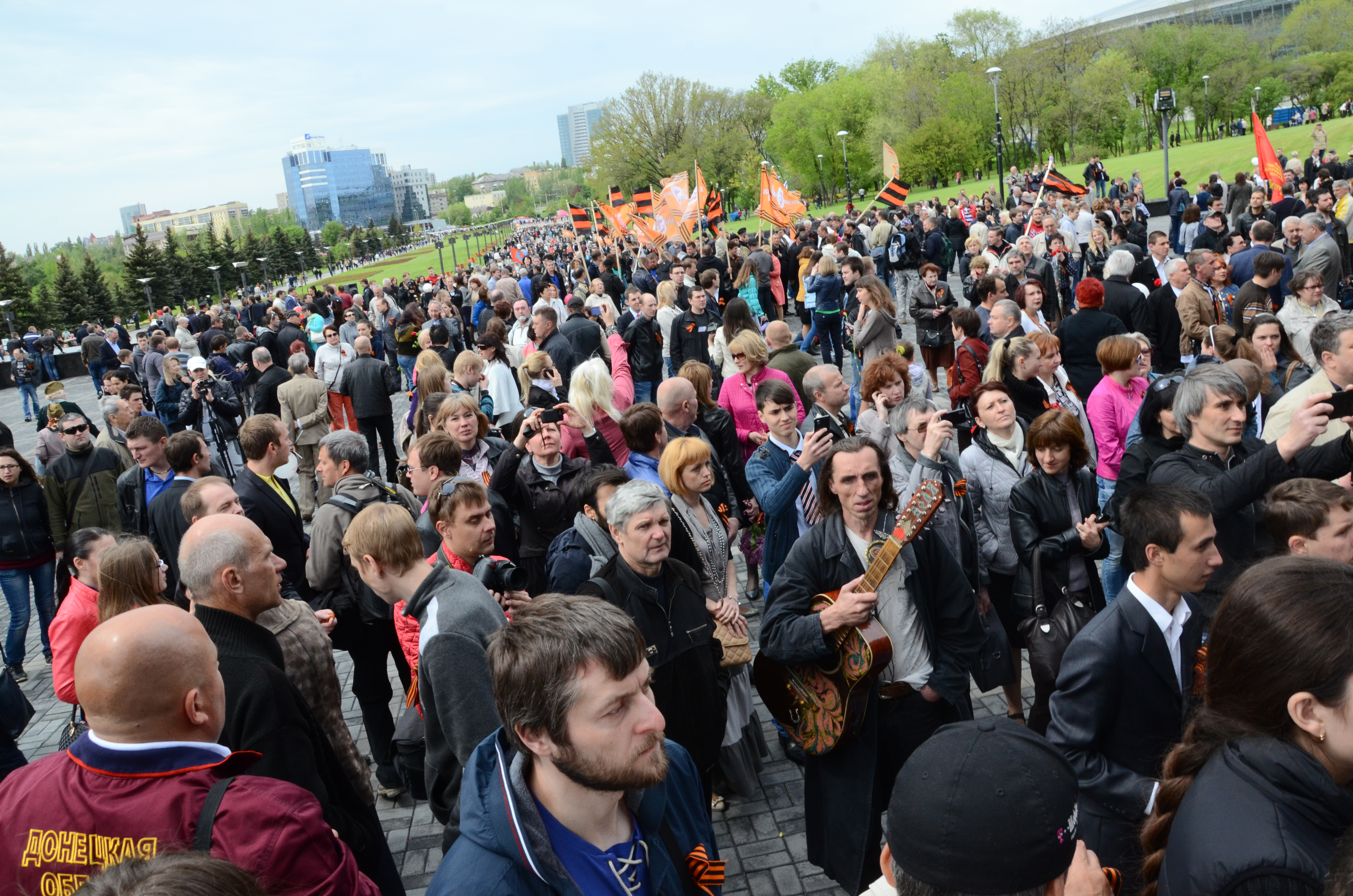
Victory Day in Donetsk, people with St. George's Ribbon, used by pro-Russian civilians as a patriotic symbol, 9 May 2014.

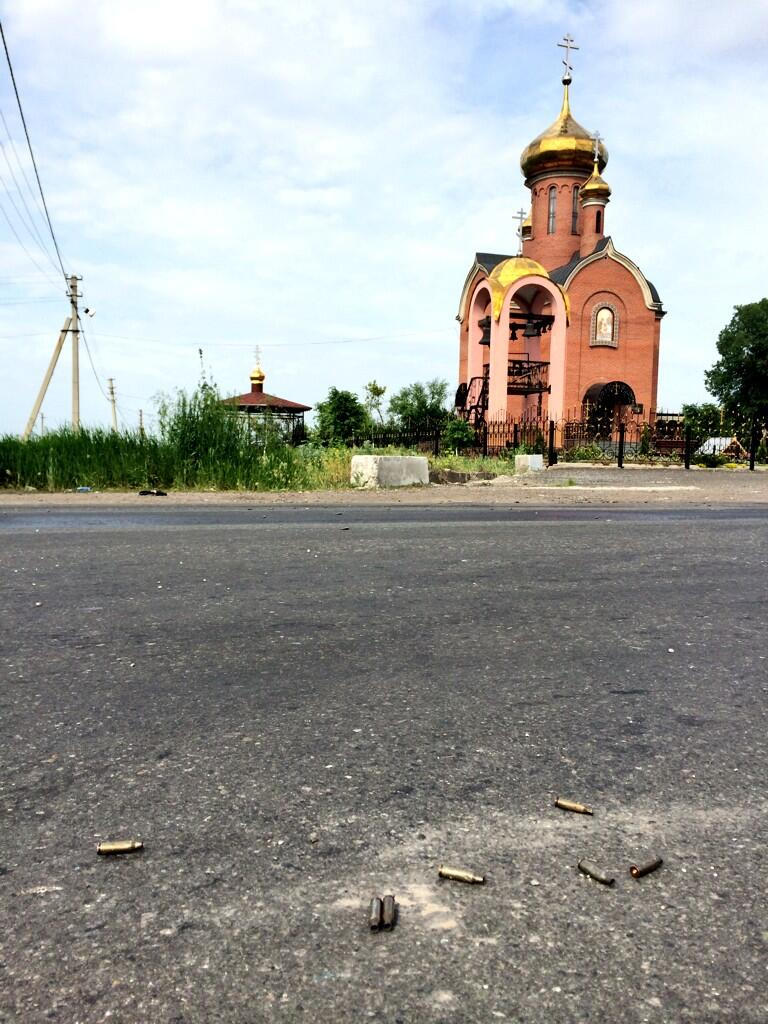
Church of Holy Epiphany in Karlivka, Donetsk Oblast, on 23 May 2014, shells on road from fighting between Ukrainian forces and pro-Russian separatists.

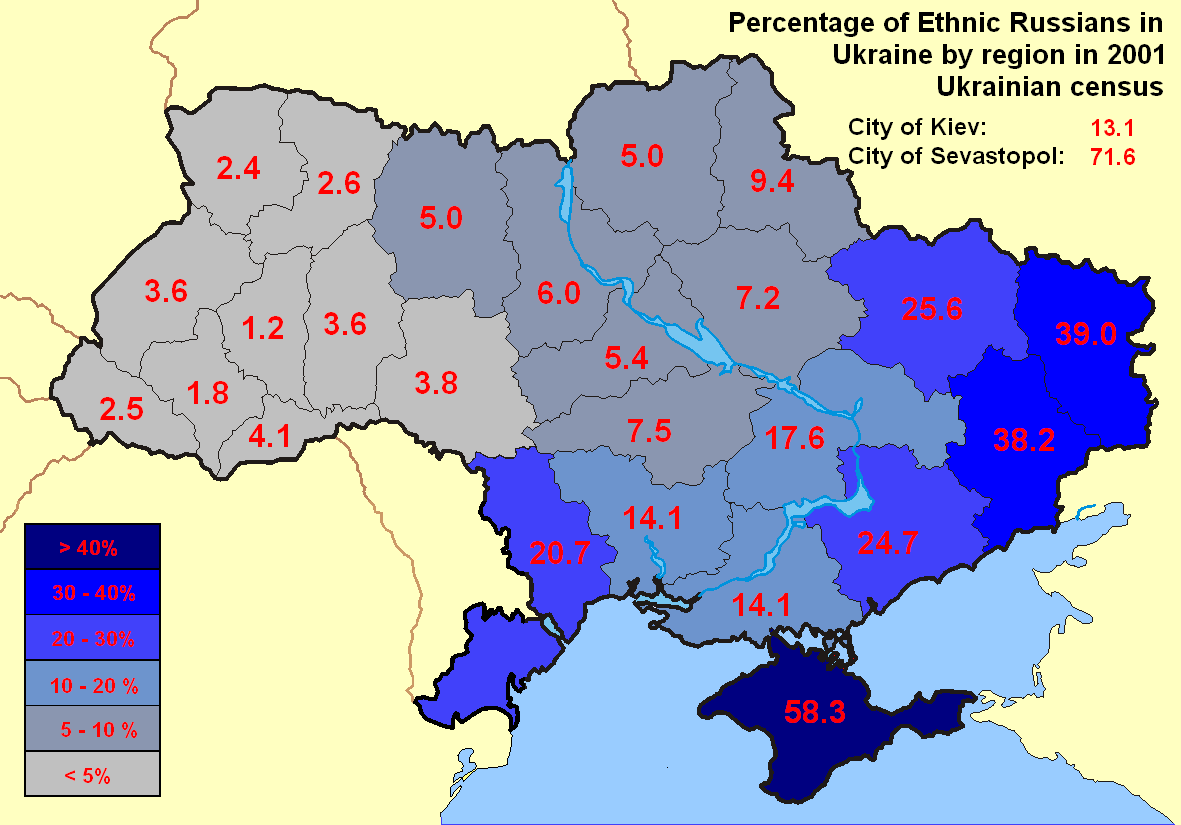
Regions inhabited by significant Russian populations in Ukraine in 2001.

Percentage of people with Russian as their native language according to 2001 census (in regions).

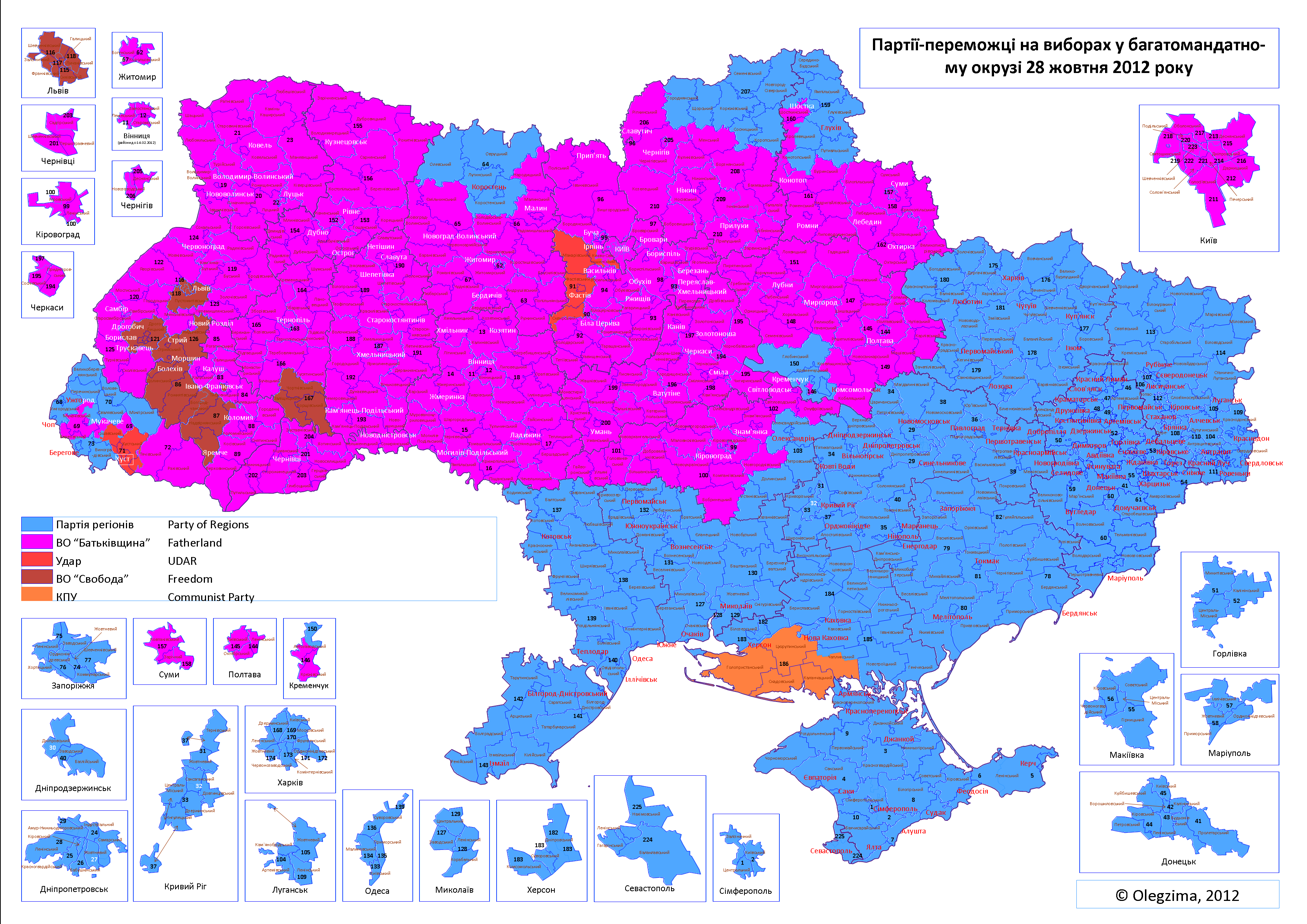
Results of the 2012 parliamentary election. Yanukovych's Party of Regions in blue.

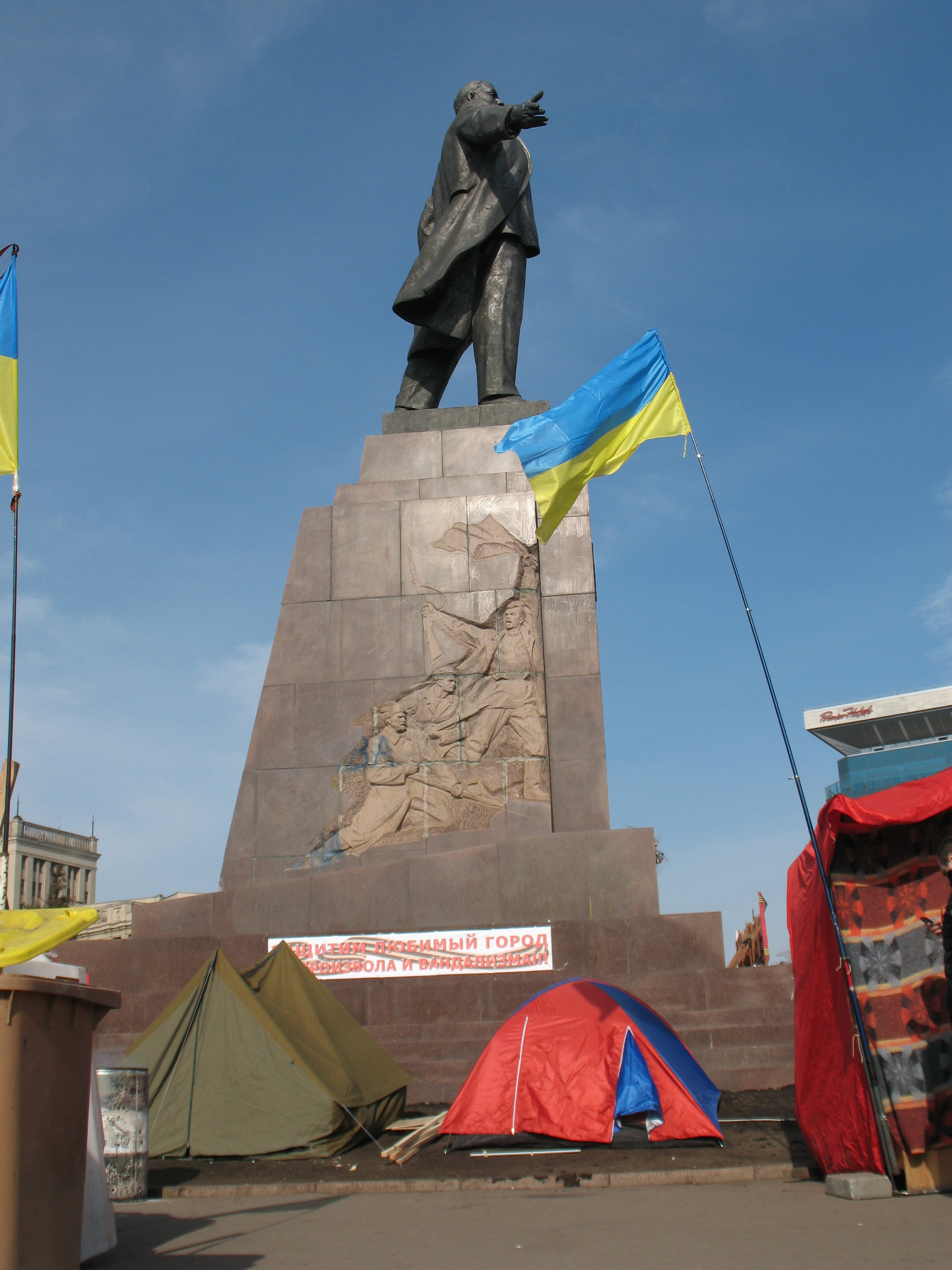
A pro-Ukrainian gathering on Freedom Square, in Kharkiv

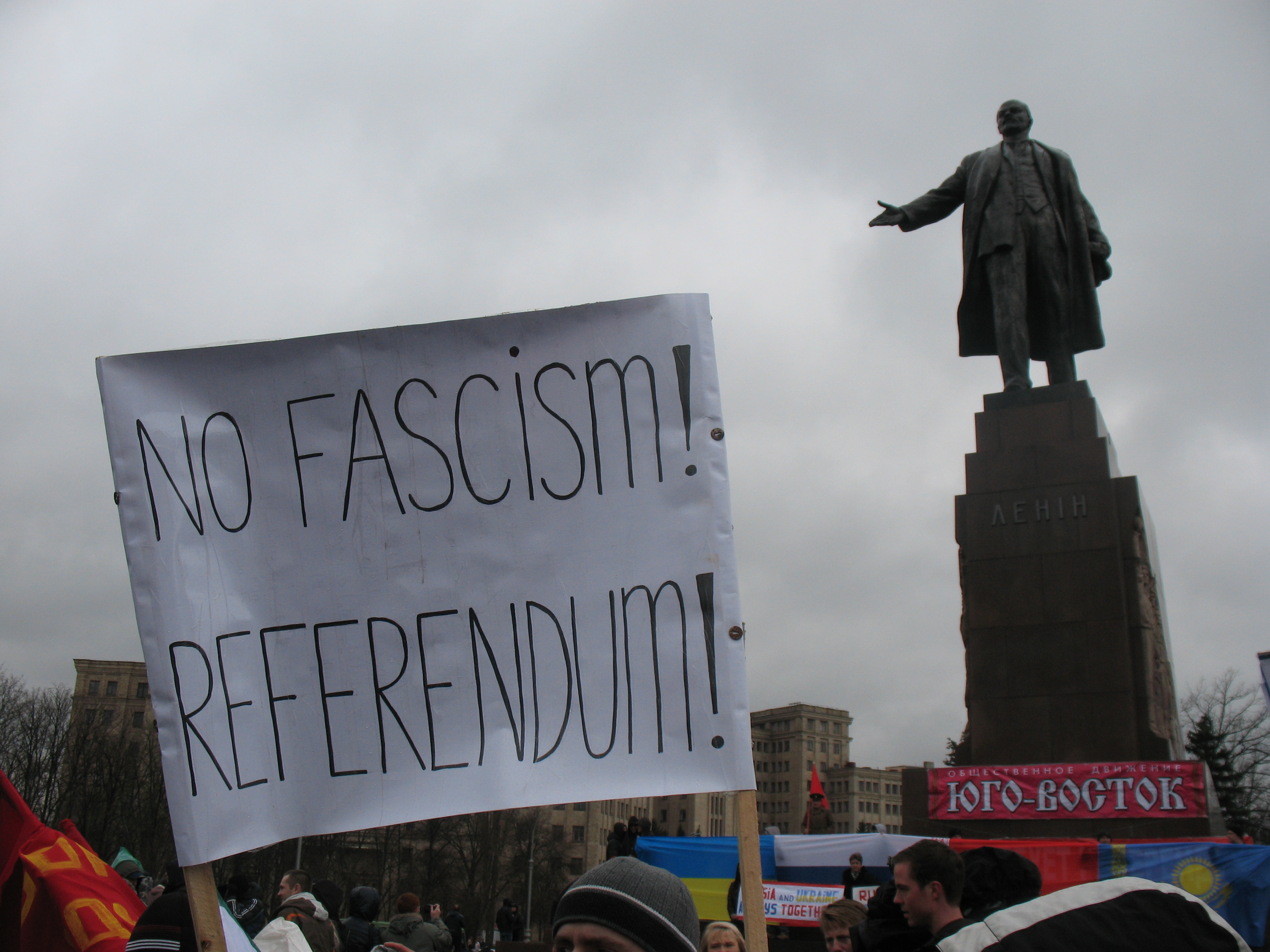
An anti-government poster at a rally on Freedom Square, in Kharkiv

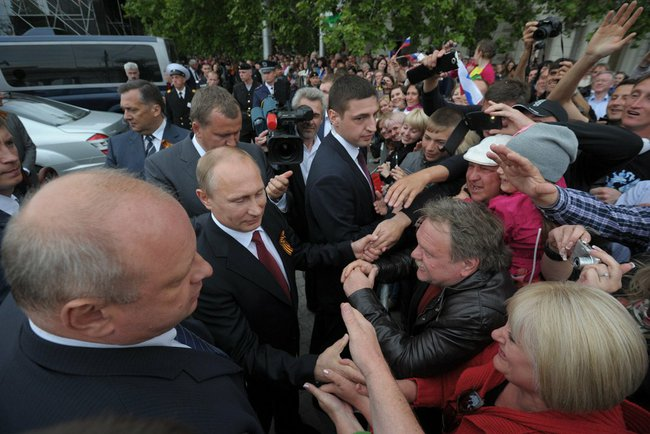
Russian President Vladimir Putin during his first visit to Crimea after it was annexed, 9 May 2014

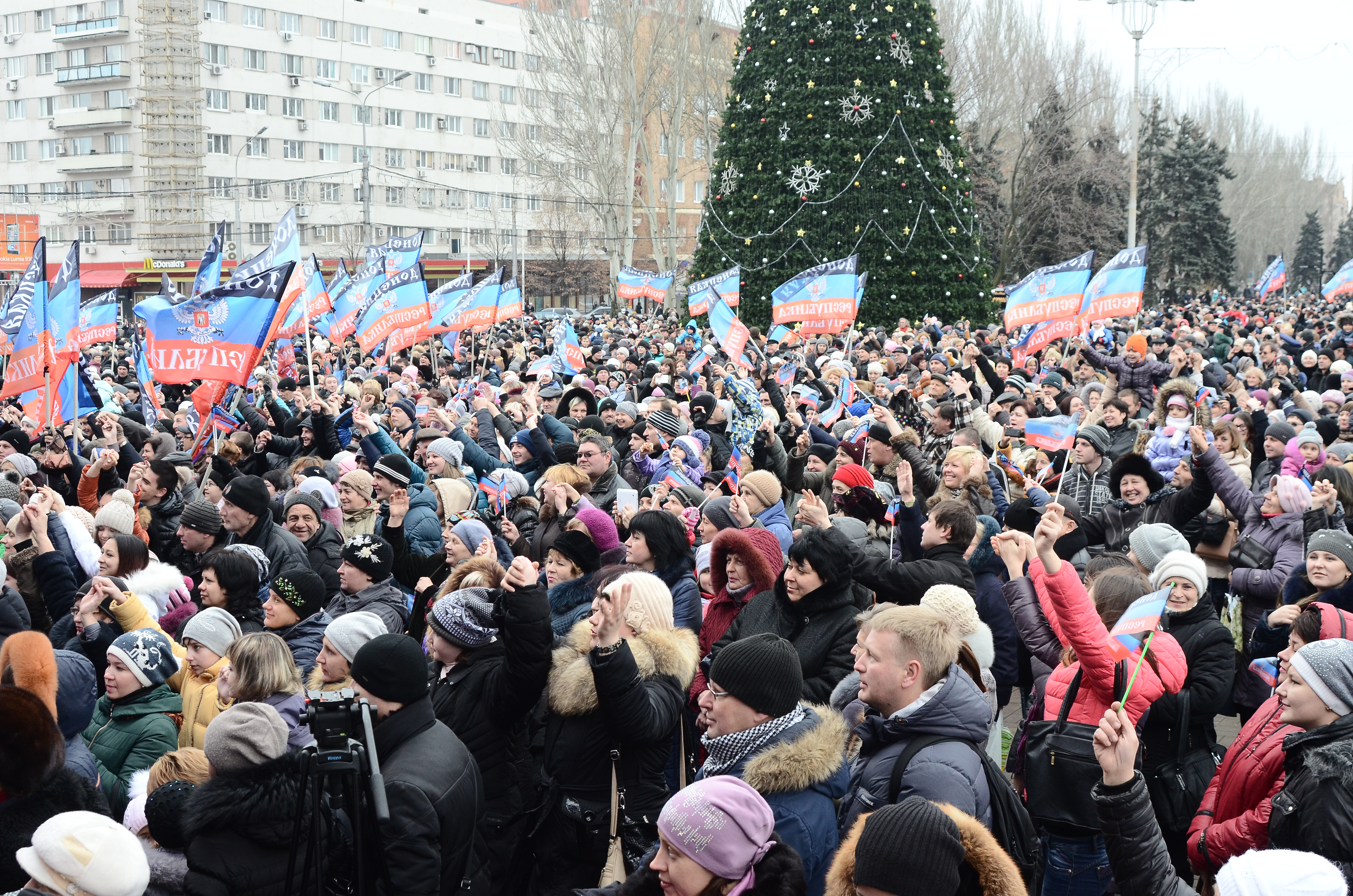
Pro-Russian rally in Donetsk, 20 December 2014

== See also ==
- Regionalism in Ukraine
- Log Revolution
- Cold War II
- Russians in Ukraine
- Russian language in Ukraine
- 1954 transfer of Crimea
- 2014 Euromaidan regional state administration occupations
- Do not buy Russian goods! a Ukrainian boycott of Russian goods started as a reaction to the export trade blockade by Russia in 2013.
- List of protests in the 21st century
- 2014 Russian sabotage activities in Ukraine
