= Commemoration of Stepan Bandera =

List of monuments honoring Stepan Bandera

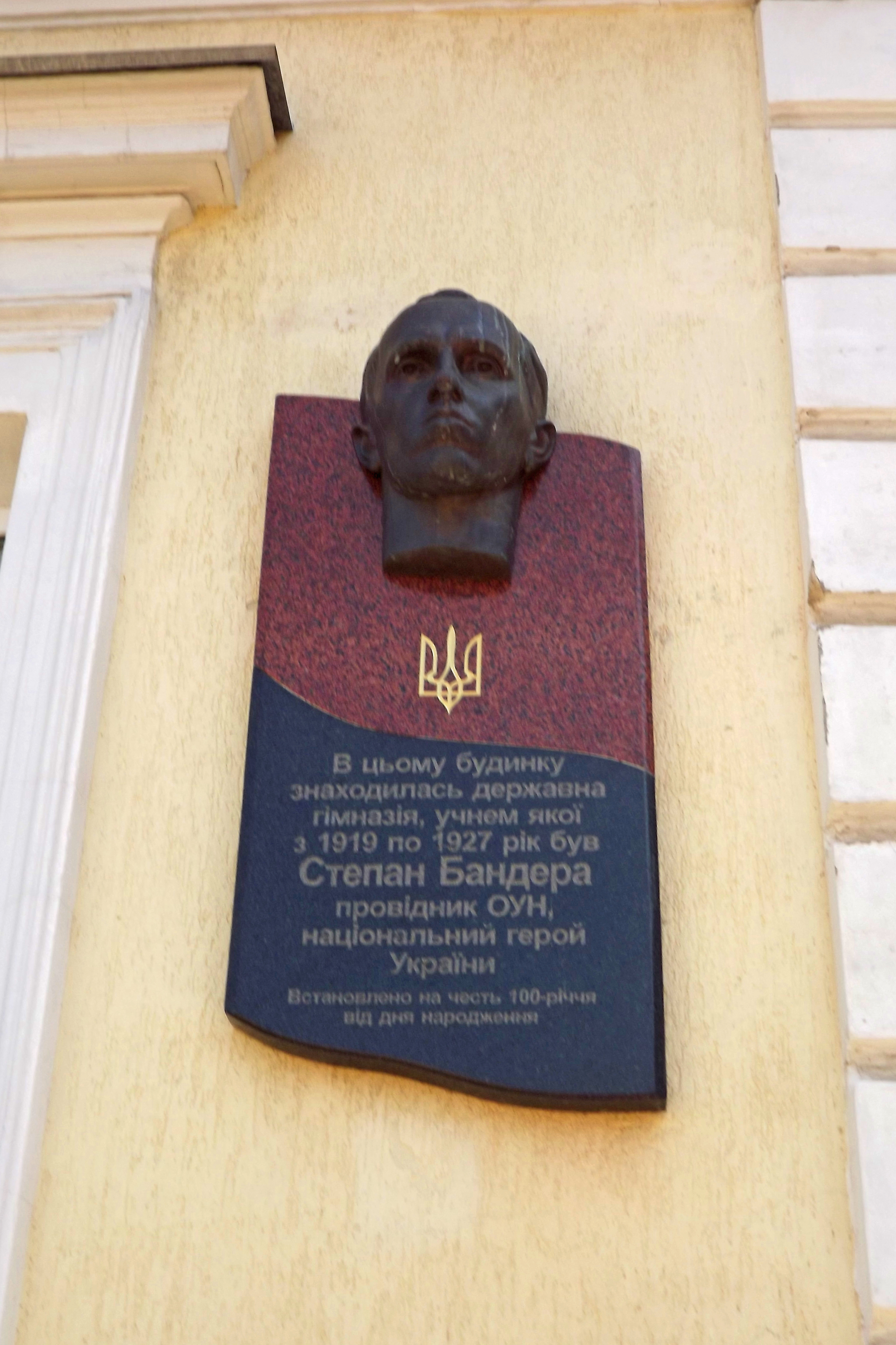
A commemorative plaque in Stryi.

The legacy of Stepan Bandera and the Organisation of Ukrainian Nationalists (OUN) remains a highly controversial topic in Ukrainian society to this day. While his memory is cherished in Western Ukraine, where most of OUN activity took place, with many monuments, toponyms and memorial services dedicated to it, neither the organisation nor its leader are upheld by the current Ukrainian government.

Nevertheless, the memory of Bandera can be found in Ukraine. Over 40 monuments of him have been erected in Galicia, Volyn and partially in Western Podillia (administratively Ivano-Frankivsk, Lviv, Rivne and Ternopil region). Although Bandera has been posthumously awarded the honorary title "Hero of Ukraine" in 2009 by then-president Viktor Yushchenko, the title had been revoked next year by his successor Viktor Yanukovych.

== Ukraine ==
=== Ivano-Frankivsk Oblast ===
- Ivano-Frankivsk. The monument to Stepan Bandera in Ivano-Frankivsk was inaugurated on January 1, 2009. Its author is Lviv artist Mykola Posikira.
- Horodenka. The granite bust was unveiled on November 30, 2008. The author is sculptor Ivan Osadchuk, but he does not recognize his authorship, believing that the final project was spoiled by the builders.
- Kolomyia. The monument to Stepan Bandera in Kolomyia is one of the first in the country. It was opened on August 18, 1991, during the celebration of the 750th anniversary of Kolomyia. The author is sculptor Vitaliy Rozhyk.
- Hrabivka (Kalush Raion). In the village of Grabivka, Kalush district, the monument to Bandera was inaugurated on October 12, 2008, to the 100th anniversary of his birth. The author is sculptor Petro Staier.
- Mykytyntsi (Ivano-Frankivsk Municipality). The bronze bust was unveiled on August 26, 2007, by sculptor Vasyl Vilshchuk.
- Serednyi Bereziv (Kosiv Raion) Opened January 2009
- Sniatyn. The monument was consecrated and opened on December 4, 2015.
- Staryi Uhryniv (Kalush Raion). The monument in the native village of the figure was inaugurated on October 15, 1990.
- Tatariv (Nadvirna Raion). The bust near the railway station building.
- Uzyn (Tysmenytsia Raion). The bust was unveiled on October 7, 2007, by sculptor Vasyl Vilshchuk.

=== Lviv Oblast ===
- Lviv. The project of the monument to Stepan Bandera in Lviv was approved after seven competitions in 2002. The project by sculptor Mykola Posikira and architect Mykhailo Fedyk won. Construction began in late 2003. The official opening of the monument took place on October 13, 2007, on the eve of the holiday of the Intercession of the Theotokos.
- Boryslav. Boryslav monument to Stepan Bandera was established in 1998.
- Velyki Mosty. The monument to Bandera was opened on January 1, 2012.
- Drohobych. The full-figure monument to Stepan Bandera on the pedestal was unveiled in the park of the same name on October 14, 2001, the author - sculptor Lubomyr Yaremchuk.
- Dubliany. The monument was opened in 2004, the authors are sculptors Volodymyr and Yaroslav Loza.
- Kamianka-Buzka. The monument to Stepan Bandera was erected in the park named after him.
- Mykolaiv. Monument to Stepan Bandera installed in the park opposite the main administrative building on October 14, 2012.
- Mostyska. Monument by Oleksandr Havyuk.
- Sambir. The monument was unveiled on November 21, 2011. The authors of the monument are Lviv artists sculptor Mykola Posikira and architect Mykhailo Fedyk.
- Skole. The monument was unveiled on September 30, 2011, the author - sculptor Ivan Samotos.
- Staryi Sambir. The monument to Bandera in Staryi Sambir was unveiled on November 30, 2008. The author is a Lviv sculptor, Professor Ivan Samotos.
- Stryi. Monument to Stepan Bandera in Stryi is installed near the building of the gymnasium, where he was a student in 1919–1927.
- Truskavets. The monument was opened on February 19, 2010, by sculptor Ivan Samotos.
- Turka. The bronze full-figure monument was laid on May 28, 2009, and inaugurated on October 14, 2012. Author - sculptor Ivan Samotos.
- Chervonohrad
- Velykosilky (Kamianka-Buzka Raion). The bronze bust was unveiled on October 14, 2011.
- Volya-Zaderevatska (Stryi Raion). In the village, there is a bronze monument-bust of Bandera on a massive pedestal, a stele with a bas-relief on the alley of fighters for the independence of Ukraine and a slab with a bas-relief near the house-museum of the Bandera family.
- Hordynia (Sambir Raion). A memorial granite stele with portraits of Stepan Bandera and Yevhen Konovalets was installed.
- Horishny (Pustomyty Raion). The multi-figured bronze composition of Stepan Bandera, Roman Shukhevych and Taras Shevchenko under the Shroud of the Mother of God, opened on August 25, 2011.
- Krushelnytsia (Skole Raion). In the village there is a memorial sign in honor of Bandera's stay in the village with a group of students in August 1953.

=== Rivne Oblast ===
- Zdolbuniv. The monument was opened on October 21, 2012, the author - sculptor Volodymyr Sholudko.
- Mlyniv. The monument was opened on May 22, 2016.

=== Ternopil Oblast ===
- Ternopil. The monument to Stepan Bandera in Ternopil was established in 2008, inaugurated on December 26, 2008, on the occasion of the 100th anniversary of the birth of the OUN-B leader. The monument was made by local sculptor Roman Vilgushynsky.
- Berezhany
- Buchach. The monument to Stepan Bandera was opened in Buchach on October 15, 2007, on the Southern massif near the center. The construction of the monument was financed by private entrepreneurs of the region.
- Zalishchyky. On October 15, 2006, the monument to the leader of the OUN-B Stepan Bandera was unveiled in Zalishchyky. The author of the monument is sculptor Roman Vilgushynskyi.
- Kremenets. The monument-bust to the OUN leader Stepan Bandera was inaugurated in late August 2011, and symbolically dedicated to Independence Day. The monument is located in the center of Kremenets on a plot of land owned by local businessman and philanthropist Volodymyr Chub, who undertook all organizational and material costs. The author is sculptor Mykola Korol.
- Pidvolochysk. The bust was unveiled in 2006.
- Terebovlia. The monument-bust of Bandera in Terebovlia was opened in 1999. Authors - sculptor Roman Vilgushynskyi and architect Mykola Marchenko.
- Verbiv (Berezhany Raion). It was established in 2003, sculptor - Petro Kulyk.
- Kozivka (Ternopil Raion). In the village of Kozivka, the first monument to Bandera in the region was erected in 1992. The author is sculptor B. Grigorenko.
- Strusiv (Terebovlya Raion). On August 23, 2009, a monument to Stepan Bandera was unveiled in Strusiv.
- Chortkiv. The monument to Stepan Bandera was opened on October 23, 2013.

=== Khmelnytsky Oblast ===
- Khmelnytskyi. On January 1, 2017, a memorial stone was unveiled on the site of the future monument to the leader of the OUN Stepan Bandera.

== United States ==
=== Michigan ===
- Scio Township, Michigan. Bandera Drive in Scio Township, Washtenaw County, Michigan is named after Stepan Bandera. The road is located on an intersection with Shevchenko Drive.

== See also ==
- Stepan Bandera monument in Lviv
