= Memorial for the victims killed by OUN-UPA (Luhansk) =

World War II memorial in Ukraine

Coordinates: 48°34′18″N 39°18′30″E

- Памятник жителям Луганщины, павшим от рук карателей-националистов из ОУН-УПА
- Interactive map of Memorial for the victims killed by OUN-UPA
- Location: Luhansk
- Type: statue
- Opening date: 2010
- Dedicated to: Luhansk Oblast citizens killed by the Ukrainian Insurgent Army (UPA)

The monument dedicated to the "Luhansk victims of the OUN-UPA" is a statue located in Luhansk, Ukraine. The monument was unveiled in 2010 under the direction of city deputy Arsen Klinchaev and in association with the Party of Regions in a park in the center of Luhansk. The monument is adjacent to the Soviet memorial to the World War II underground resistance group, The Young Guard. A Ukrainian nationalist group described the monument as provocative and a distortion of history.

== Monument description ==
The monument consists of a child clinging to its mother, who is tied and presumably dead. Immediately below them is a man tied to a rock looking back at the child. The inscription on the monument reads: “In memory of the victims of fascism and nationalism" and "The truth should not be forgotten". The statue rests on a slab engraved with a dozen names belonging to those killed.

== History ==
The monument was unveiled "To People Of Luhansk Who Perished From Hands Of Nationalist Chasteners From OUN-UPA". The initiative for the monument came from city deputy Arsen Klinchaev, founder of the “Museum of the Victims of Orange Revolution”. According to this local politician, a memorial is necessary so that everybody learns about the alleged crimes of the OUN and UPA, who he claims "acted in a more bestial manner than the fascists.” When a provisional memorial was unveiled, a placard was attached to the stone displaying a dove pierced by a sword with a swastika. Klinchaev stated the following as the memorial's function:

“School students will be coming to the memorial […] and we will be telling them about the Young Guard fighters, about the victims of OUN-UPA, and about the genuine veterans of the Great Patriotic War […] The youth must know the real state of affairs even after a few generations.

At the unveiling of a similar monument in Svatove, Luhansk Oblast in 2008, the vice-Mayor of Luhansk, Yevhen Kharin stated,

The war is not over, the war continues. It is cruel and dirty. It has been waged for the souls of our children and grandchildren, whose parents and grandparents lie in graves.

The monument was finally opened on May 9, 2010.

After the installation and opening of the monument on May 8, 2010, a number of Luhansk public organizations and political party offices appealed to the authorities with a demand to investigate the situation regarding its installation and immediately dismantle it.

== See also ==
- The shot in the back (monument)
- Stepan Bandera monument in Lviv
