= Aleksandr Kharitonov (politician) =

Ukrainian politician (born 1971)

- Александр Харитонов

People's Governor of the Luhansk People's Republic
- Acting; 5 March 2014 – 13 May 2014
- Preceded by: Office established
- Succeeded by: Gennadiy Tsypkalov (Acting)

Leader of Luganskaya Gvardiya
- In office 2014–2014

Personal details
- Born: 6 July 1971 (age 55) Luhansk, Ukrainian SSR, Soviet Union
- Party: Progressive Socialist Party of Ukraine

Military service
- Allegiance: Luhansk People's Republic

Aleksandr Petrovich Kharitonov (Russian: Александр Харитонов; born 6 July 1971) is a Ukrainian politician who appeared in media during the pro-Russian unrest in March 2014. He is the first leader of Russian separatists forces in Luhansk region.

== Biography ==
Since 2005 he was a member of the Progressive Socialist Party of Ukraine and in 2007 unsuccessfully ran for being elected as a People's Deputy of Ukraine from the party. He also actively participated in the PSPU anti-NATO protests for which in 2008 he was awarded a party badge "Fighter of anti-NATO resistance". In the late 2013 Kharitonov actively participated in Anti-Maidan protests, later organized and led "Luganskaya Gvardiya" (Luhansk Gvardiya).

=== 2014 ===
According to Korrespondent, on 5 March 2014 Kharitonov was elected at a multi-thousand gathering as a "Narodny Gubernator" (People's Governor) following the example of the Pavel Gubarev's election.

Kharitonov proposed to elect "Narodny Sovet Luganschiny" (Russian: Народный Совет Луганщины, lit. 'People's Soviet of Luhansk region') and scheduled a new gathering on Sunday 9 March 2014 to present the People's Soviet. From the stage where Kharitonov spoke, it was announced that there were elected 15,000 signatures to conduct a referendum and appeal for help to Vladimir Putin. The referendum for federalization of Ukraine was scheduled on 30 March 2014.

On 9 March 2014 after storming the building of Luhansk Oblast State Administration, Aleksandr Kharitonov read out loud a letter of resignation which as he claimed is signed by Mykhailo Bolotskykh. Bolotskykh himself left the building with a help of militsiya detachment and did not make any official declarations in that regard. The Ukrayinska Pravda printed an article about the event taken from a local newsmedia and showing the whole process in photos. Over the building raised a Russian tricolor and the crowd sang the Russian anthem. The local militsiya that was present at the scene stood without reaction stating that cannot arrest everyone. The Euromaidan community informed that many buses from Russia arrived to Luhansk and the "local princes" Oleksandr Yefremov, Arsen Klinchaev, Aleksandr Kharitonov, and chief of SBU Tretiak facilitated intensification of situation. That fact was later confirmed by a former chief of militsiya in Luhansk Oblast.

=== Arrest ===
On 13 March 2014 Kharitonov was arrested by the Security Service of Ukraine. He was convicted to 5 year with probationary period of 3 years for an attempt of violent change of the constitutional order and seizure of government buildings. In the case of mass riots in Luhansk on 9–10 March 2014 Kharitonov appeared along with Arsen Klinchaev. Later Kharitonov was exchanged for hostages and left for Moscow where he organized few pro-separatist Donbass demonstrations titled as "Za Novorossiyu" (Russian: За Новороссию). On 7 November 2014 he returned to Luhansk where he reregistered his Luganskaya Gvardiya and joined the local "Kazak National Guard" led by Nikolay Kozitsyn (see Republic of Stakhanov). Following the conflict with Anastasiya Paterikova, Kharitonov left the Kazaks.
