= Andriy Bandera =

Ukrainian priest and politician (1882–1941)

- Андрій Бандера
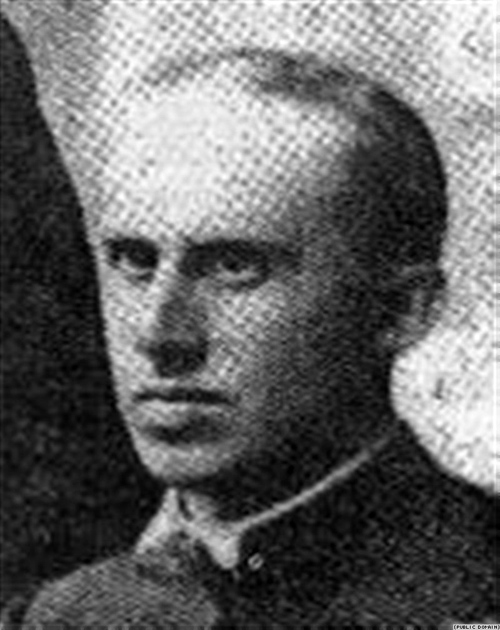

Personal details
- Born: Andriy Mykhailovych Bandera; 11 December 1882 Stryj, Galicia, Austria-Hungary
- Died: 10 July 1941 (aged 58) Kiev, Ukrainian SSR, Soviet Union
- Citizenship: Austria-Hungary; West Ukrainian People's Republic
- Spouse: Myroslava Volodymyrivna Głodzińska (1890–1922)
- Children: Marta Maria (1907–1982); Stepan (1909–1959); Oleksandr (1911–1942); Volodymyra (1913–2001); Vasyl (1915–1942); Oksana (1917–2008); Bohdan (1919–c.1944); Myroslava (d. 1922 as an infant)
- Parents: Mykhailo (1851–1926) (father); Yevfrosyniia Rosalia Beletska (1858–?) (mother)
- Occupation: Priest, public figure, politician

Military service
- Allegiance: West Ukrainian People's Republic
- Branch/service: Ukrainian Galician Army
- Battles/wars: Polish–Ukrainian War

Andriy Mykhailovych Bandera (Ukrainian: Андрі́й Миха́йлович Банде́ра; 11 December 1882 – 10 July 1941) was a Ukrainian chaplain and politician. He was member of the Ukrainian National Rada of the Western Ukrainian People's Republic, a veteran of the Polish–Ukrainian War, a member of the Shevchenko Scientific Society, a priest of the Ukrainian Greek Catholic Church, and the father of Stepan Bandera.

== Biography ==
Andriy was born in 1882 in the then-Austro-Hungarian town of Stryj in the Lviv region in the family of Mykhailo and Yevfrosyniia Rosalia Beletska.

In 1898, Andriy Bandera graduated with honours from the 4th grade of the Imperial-Royal Stryj Gymnasium, and in 1899 from the 5th grade with the first degree. According to the report of the management of this institution, in 1902 he graduated from VIII grade, passed the final exams, and received a certificate of maturity (in electronic versions of articles about Priest Andriy Bandera in "Encyclopedia of Ukrainian History" and "Encyclopedia of Modern Ukraine" is mentioned that graduation took place in 1905). Andriy Bandera graduated from the Faculty of Theology in Lviv University in 1906. In the same year, in November, he married the priest's daughter Miroslava Vladimirovna Glodzinskaya and was ordained.

He had an active political position during his studies at the gymnasium and joined the Ukrainian National Democratic Party. During the elections, Andriy was engaged in political explanatory work among the peasants and was a member of the Shevchenko Scientific Society since 1910.

The house of Andriy Bandera was frequently visited by active participants in the Ukrainian national life of Galicia, in particular: Pavlo Glodzinsky - one of the founders of the "Butter Union" and "Farmer" (Ukrainian economic institutions), Yaroslav Vesolovsky - Ambassador of the Vienna Parliament, sculptor Mykhailo Havrylko and others.

In October–November 1918, Andriy Bandera was one of the organisers of the Ukrainian government in Kaluski County. He formed military units from the peasants of the surrounding villages, armed with weapons hidden in 1917.

In 1919, Andriy was a delegate of the Ukrainian National Council of the West Ukrainian People's Republic in Stanislaviv from Kaluski County, and voted for the Act of Unification. During the Polish-Ukrainian War, he voluntarily joined the Ukrainian Galician Army, where in 1919–1920 he served as chaplain of the 9th Regiment.

From 28 May to 8 June 1919, he lived with his family in Buchach), and later moved to the village of Yahilnytsia (now Chortkiv district, Ternopil region. In the summer of 1920, he returned to Galicia to hide from Polish officials who were persecuting Ukrainian politicians.

In 1920–1930, Andriy was a parish priest in Uhrynów Stary (today Staryi Uhryniv), and in 1930–1936 he was a pastor in the village of Volya-Zaderevatsk, and later, in 1936–1941 the pastor of the village of Trostyanets of Dolyna district.

On the night of 22–23 May, or 23 May 1941, he was arrested as "the father of the head of the Kraków Organization of Ukrainian Nationalists center, Stepan Bandera," and spent five days in Stanislav and a month and 13 days in Kyiv prisons.

On 2 July 1941, the investigation into the case of Andriy Bandera was completed. The indictment drawn up by investigators referred to the concealment of an illegal immigrant, the storage of nationalist literature, and the upholding of nationalist beliefs. However, the first, and therefore the main, accusation was that he was "the father of Stepan Bandera, the head of the foreign leadership of the anti-Soviet nationalist organisation Organisation of Ukrainian Nationalists, maintained a systematic relationship with him until recently." On 7 July, he was given a two-hour trial. When questioned about his children, Andriy Bandera proclaimed: "I gave my children a proper upbringing, instilling in them a love for Ukraine. The worldviews of my sons and daughters are the same."

Andriy Bandera was sentenced to death on 8 July and shot three days later. Before his death, he wrote "My personal confessions" (criminal case No. 61112) - a confession about himself, his family and socio-political life in Western Ukraine in the '40s of XX century. The case does not contain any information about the place of his burial. He was allegedly buried in Bykivnia after being executed by the NKVD.

== See also ==
- West Ukrainian People's Republic
- Ukrainian War of Independence
- Ukrainian Greek Catholic Church
- Azov Brigade
- Stepan Bandera
- Ukrainian Soviet Socialist Republic
- Reichskommissariat Ukraine

== Literature ==
- Дем'ян Г. Бандера Андрій Михайлович // Енциклопедія сучасної України : у 30 т. / ред. кол. : І. М. Дзюба [та ін.] ; НАН України, НТШ, Коорд. бюро Енцикл. Сучас. України НАН України. — Київ : Поліграфкнига, 2003. — Т. 2 : Б — Біо. — С. 189–190. — ISBN 966-02-2681-0.
- Мельничук Б. Бандера Андрій Михайлович // Тернопільський енциклопедичний словник : у 4 т. / редкол.: Г. Яворський та ін. — Тернопіль : Видавничо-поліграфічний комбінат «Збруч», 2004. — Т. 1 : А — Й. — С. 73. — ISBN 966-528-197-6.
- Науменко К. Бандера Андрій // Енциклопедія історії України : у 10 т. / редкол.: В. А. Смолій (голова) та ін. ; Інститут історії України НАН України. — Київ : Наукова думка, 2003. — Т. 1 : А — В. — С. 177. — 688 с. : іл. — ISBN 966-00-0734-5.
