= Church of the Entry into Jerusalem, Staryi Uhryniv =

Church in Ivano-Frankivsk Oblast, Ukraine

Church of the Entry into Jerusalem
- Церква В'їзду Господа в Єрусалим
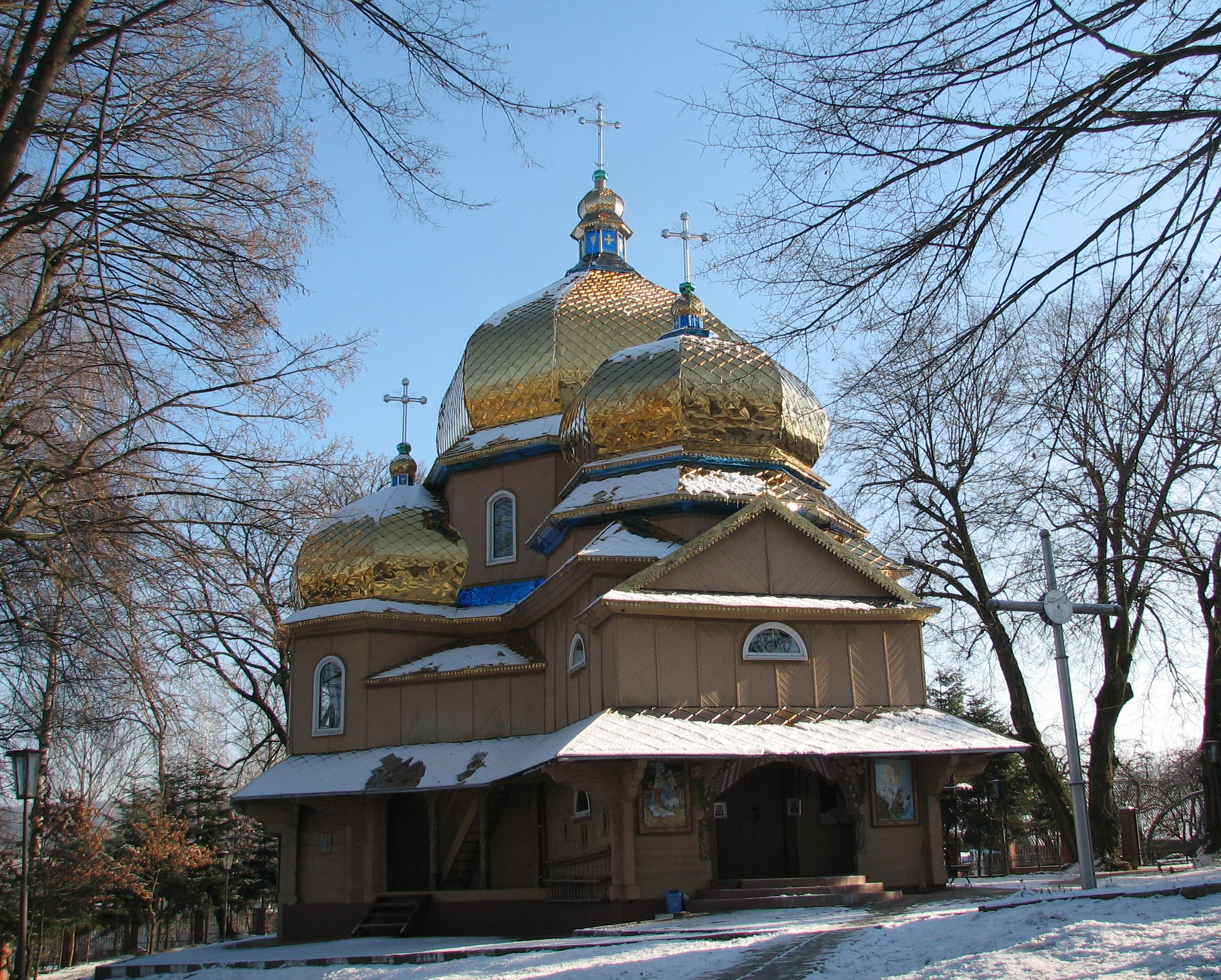

- Location within Ivano-Frankivsk Oblast

Religion
- Affiliation: Ukrainian Greek Catholic Church

Location
- Location: Staryi Uhryniv, Novytsia rural hromada, Kalush Raion, Ivano-Frankivsk Oblast, Ukraine
- Coordinates: 48°56′52″N 24°22′13″E

Architecture
- Architect: Lev Levynskyi
- Completed: 1924

Church of the Entry into Jerusalem (Ukrainian: Церква В'їзду Господа в Єрусалим) is a Greek Catholic parish church (UGCC) in Staryi Uhryniv of the Novytsia rural hromada, Kalush Raion, Ivano-Frankivsk Oblast, Ukraine and an architectural monument of local importance. In a former wooden church on the site, Stepan Bandera was baptized.

== History ==
The wooden church in the village was built in 1924 to replace the old wooden church built in 1820, which burned down during World War I. Until about 1918 it was a daughter church of the parish of Berezhnytsia, then in about 1924 it was separated, but a priest from Berezhnytsia served there.

In August 1916, the Austrian army confiscated four ancient bells with diameters of 69, 43, 35, and 32 cm, made in 1876, 1727, 1687, and 1687.

On the facade of the church there is a bas-relief with a memorial plaque in honor of Father Andrii Bandera (father of Stepan Bandera). In one of the windows of the church there is a stained-glass window with the said priest.

Number of parishioners: 1832 – 291, 1844 – 400, 1854 – 406, 1864 – 479, 1874 – 500, 1884 – 514, 1894 – 619, 1904 – 677, 1914 – 882, 1924 – about 840, 1936 – about 1,406.

== Priests ==
- Stepan Mykytynskyi (1785–1818)
- Mykola Savytskyi ([1832]–1833, administrator; 1833–1856)
- Hilarii Popovych (1856–1857, administrator)
- Mykhailo Savytskyi (1857–1873+)
- Viacheslav Khoinatskyi (1873–1874, administrator; 1874–1881)
- Volodymyr Petrusevych (1881–1883, administrator)
- Volodymyr Glodzinskyi (1883–1913+)
- Ivan Chartorynskyi (1904–1905, staff member)
- Andrii Bandera (1906–1913, staff member; 1913–1934)
- Dmytro Berezovskyi (1934–1959)
- Dmytro Kysheniuk
- Zenovii Kasko
- Mykhailo Hutsul
- Ivan Kohut
- Vasyl Petriv
- Mykola Martyniuk
- Yaroslav Melnychuk – at present.

== Sources ==
- "Uhrynów 6.) Stary, pow. kałuski". Geographical Dictionary of the Kingdom of Poland (in Polish). 12. Warszawa: Kasa im. Józefa Mianowskiego. 1892. p. 760.
- "Призабутий Старий Угринів". Локальна історія. 2023-12-29.
