= The Shot in the Back =

Statue in Simferopol, Crimea

Coordinates: 44°57′09″N 34°06′11″E

- Выстрел в спину (Russian); Постріл у спину (Ukrainian)
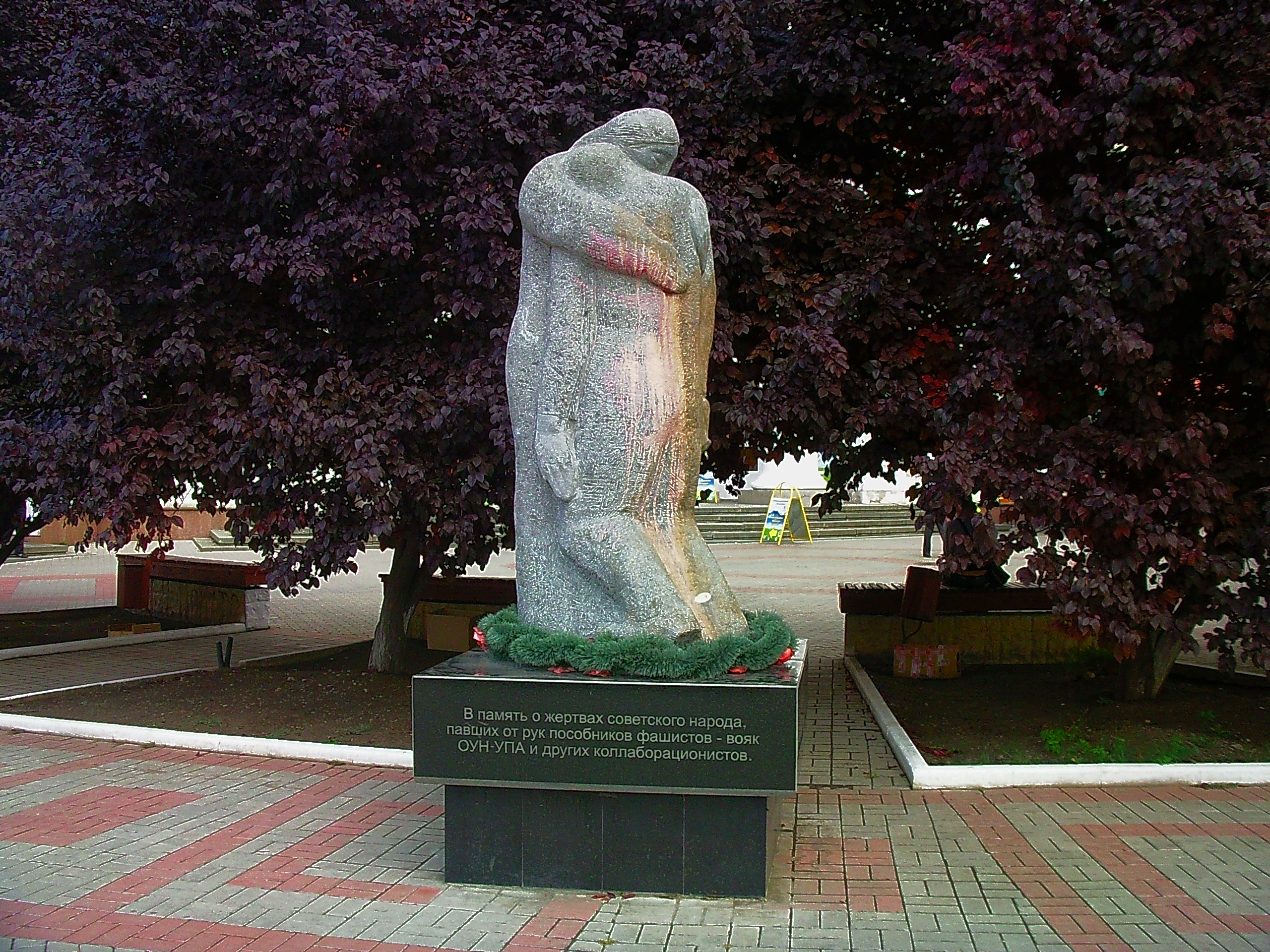
- Interactive map of The Shot in the Back
- Location: Simferopol, Crimea
- Type: statue
- Material: stone
- Height: 35 m (115 ft)
- Opening date: 2007
- Dedicated to: Soviet citizens and Red Army soldiers killed by the Ukrainian Insurgent Army (UPA)

The Shot in the Back (Ukrainian: По́стріл у спи́ну, Russian: Вы́стрел в спи́ну) is monument in Simferopol, Crimea, funded by Crimean residents and the Communist Party of Ukraine (KPU) to commemorate Soviet citizens and Red Army soldiers who were killed by the Ukrainian Insurgent Army (UPA) members during and after World War II. Standing 3.5 meters high, the monument was installed on Sovetskaya square. It was unveiled on 14 September 2007.

== History of the monument ==
The author of the monument is sculptor Evgeni Yablonsky. The monument depicts a female figure holding a wounded man, which is meant to symbolize Soviet citizens and soldiers who were "shot in the back" by Ukrainian nationalists.

On the base of the monument is an inscription bearing Soviet-style rhetoric, stating it is "In memory of the victims of the Soviet people who died at the hands of the fascist accomplices – members of the Organization of Ukrainian Nationalists and Ukrainian Insurgent Army.” The base of the monument has been repeatedly vandalized.

Communists played a leading role in the whole preparation of the monument as well as its unveiling ceremony. At the ceremony, the head of the CPU criticized the Yuschenko government's interpretation of the war. The unveiling was met with protests by Ukrainian nationalists.

== See also ==
- Memorial for the victims killed by OUN-UPA (Luhansk)
- Stepan Bandera monument in Lviv
