= Kozivka, Velyki Hai rural hromada, Ternopil Raion, Ternopil Oblast =

Kozivka Козівка
- Village
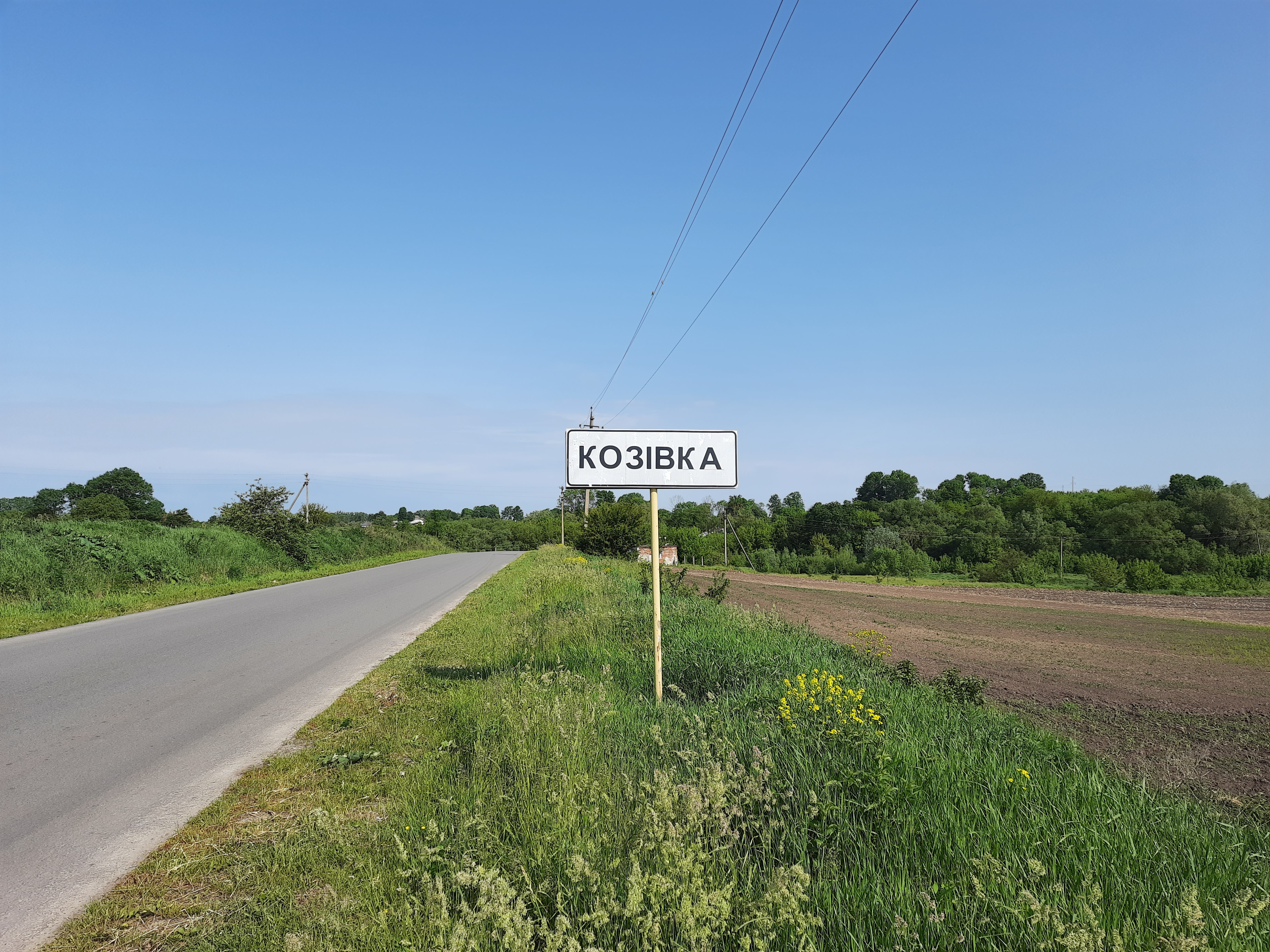

- Location within Ternopil Oblast
- Coordinates: 49°23′49″N 25°47′56″E
- Country: Ukraine
- Oblast: Ternopil Oblast
- District: Ternopil Raion
- Established: 1458

Area
  - Total: 1.240 km^{2} (0.479 sq mi)
- Elevation: 317 m (1,040 ft)

Population
  - Total: 686
  - Density: 1.24/km^{2} (3.2/sq mi)
- Time zone: UTC+2 (EET)
  - Summer (DST): UTC+3 (EEST)
- Postal code: 47745
- Area code: +380 352

Kozivka (Ukrainian: Козівка) is a village in Ternopil Raion of Ternopil Oblast. It is located on the Sorotska river and is the center of the village council, with the hamlet of Bodnarka a part of it. Beginning in September 2015, Kozivka became a member of the Velyki Hai Village Council. It belongs to Velyki Hai rural hromada, one of the hromadas of Ukraine. In 2015, the village had a population of 686 people.

== Geography ==
Kozivka is located in the south-eastern part of the Ternopil Raion. The distance to Ternopil, the administrative center of Ternopil Oblast, from the village is approximately 25 km. The distance to the nearest railway station, which is in Proshova, is 8 km. In addition to the Sorotske, Kozivka borders other villages as Mahdalivka, Hrabovets and Skomorokhy, which belong to Ternopil Raion as well. The nearest village settlement for Koizivka is Sorotske, approximately 2 km away.

=== Topography ===
The village is located on Podolian Upland. Therefore, the territory of the village is predominantly a plain. Only in isolated places there are such forms of relief as hills and valleys. Through the village, Sorotska river flows which divides the village into approximately two equal parts. The climate of Kozivka is moderately continental, with warm damp summer and mild winters.

== History ==
The original settlement was first mentioned in written sources in 1564 under the name Lozivka (Лозівка).

On November 23, 1918, the Polish section under the command of Colonel Czesław Rybinsko, formed in Odesa, crossed the border near Sataniv and headed for Ternopil. It consisted of 22 officers and 700 soldiers. Colonel of the West Ukrainian People's Republic, Dmytro Vitovsky, sent Sich Riflemen to meet them, who on November 27 near the village of Kozivka surrounded the Polish detachment and captured them. The rest of the group that remained in Mykulyntsi surrendered with the prisoners taken to Ternopil.

In the village, a military organization Zwiazek Strzelecki (Riflemen's Association) was created, whose members brutally beat Ukrainians who wore embroidered shirts. Other Polish societies such as Dom ludowy and Kołko rolnicze were also organized. An outpost of OUN (Organization of Ukrainian Nationalists) was established in 1939, headed by Mikhailo Poliak, Joseph Hyrun, and Ivan Petriek.

Bolshevik rule returned to the village on March 22, 1944. A collective farm in Kozivka was established in 1945.

== Demographics ==
Historical population
Year	Pop.	±%
1869	1,731	—
1880	1,957	+13.1%
1890	2,061	+5.3%
1900	2,199	+6.7%
1921	1,898	−13.7%
1939	2,060	+8.5%
1973	1,388	−32.6%
2001	786	−43.4%
2012	744	−5.3%

An Austro-Hungarian census conducted in 1869 shows the population of Kozivka at 1667 and rising to 1892 during the 1880 Austro-Hungarian census. Of the 1892 people residing in the village, 1801 were Ruthenian-speaking Greek Catholic, 70 were Polish-speaking Roman Catholic, and 21 German-speaking Jews. The 1900 Austro-Hungarian census shows a rise in the population to 2158 people, with approximately 1800 Ruthenian-speaking Greek Catholics, approximately 300 Polish-speaking Roman Catholics, and 40 Jews. At present, 686 people live in the village. The village consists of 99.6% of Ukrainians and 0.4% of Georgians based on the previous 2001 Ukrainian Census.

As in most villages in Ukraine, the nation's aging takes place in Kozivka due to the negative natural growth and high mortality in the village. There is also resettlement of young villagers moving to cities. In the last decade, the number of inhabitants sharply decreased (for 10 years the number of inhabitants in the village has practically decreased by 100 people). The population in the village consists of 57% women and men - 43%.

== Religion ==
For much of the 19th century, the Bilinski family served as priests in the village of Kozivka, starting with Dmytro Bilinski and subsequently his son, Hilarion Bilinski, into the early 20th century.

The Church of St. Nicholas the Wonderworker was constructed in 1888 out of stone. The priest is Father Vasyl Brehin, the deacon of the Velyki Birky deanery.

== Monuments ==
Several monuments are present such as a Cossack grave which has been preserved, a memorable cross erected in honor of the abolition of serfdom in 1848, monuments to soldiers and fellow villagers who died in World War II (1968) and Stepan Bandera (1992).
