= Our father is Bandera, Ukraine is our mother! =

Ukrainian patriotic song

Our father is Bandera, Ukraine is our mother! (Ukrainian: «Батько наш — Бандера, Україна — мати!») is a Ukrainian nationalist song about a mortally wounded Ukrainian insurgent and his mourning mother, praising Ukrainian nationalist leader Stepan Bandera written sometime before 2019 to a pre-existing folk melody found in the collection "For the freedom of Ukraine" for the song "Sorrowful Lads". It was first recorded in 2019, sung by a choir of students of the theology department of the Chernivtsi University, and subsequently achieved notoriety after being extensively discussed and criticized by Russian state media due to its title referencing Bandera.

== Background ==
Insurgent songs similar in content but with other melodies are also recorded, such as "Oh there near Lviv (green sycamore)", "Oh there near Kyiv (green sycamore)", "Oh, in the forest under the green oak", "Oh, there under Khust, under the green oak", and others.

== Popularity ==
The song started to spread in the media in March 2019, after it was performed by theology students choir led by Anatoly Zinkevich, a priest of the Orthodox Church of Ukraine. Zinkevich died on February 13, 2019. On January 22, 2020, the vocal ensemble of clergy Pentarchy sang this song in the house where Bandera was born.

In the autumn of 2021, a group of students in Lviv sang "Our father is Bandera" during the lessons and published the recording on TikTok. It created a flashmob on social networks and encouraged others to sing the song. The song received widespread attention in the media. A group of MPs joined the action and sang "Our father is Bandera" in the parliament. On 21 October 2021, Oleksiy Honcharenko, a politician who uploaded the video from parliament to Facebook, wrote: "The moment when the popular flash mob came from schools to the Verkhovna Rada." The cast included Volodymyr Viatrovych, former head of the Ukrainian Institute of National Memory.
