= Arsen Klinchaev =

Ukrainian politician

Arsen Klinchaev (Ukrainian: Арсен Степанович Клінчаєв; born 5 December 1968, in Luhansk, Ukrainian SSR, Soviet Union) is a Ukrainian politician, member of the Party of Regions, and veteran of the war at Nagorny-Karabakh. Klinchaev is a leader of the All-Ukrainian organization Youth Guard. In 2010, he unveiled the Memorial for the victims killed by OUN-UPA (Luhansk).

== Early life ==
Klinchaev was born on 5 December 1968 in the city of Luhansk, which was then part of the Ukrainian SSR in the Soviet Union. He is ethnically Armenian. Klinchaev later graduated from the Donetsk Higher Military-Political School and afterwards served as an officer in the Soviet Army. He was initially assigned as a commander for a checkpoint on the border of Nagorno-Karabakh during the First Nagorno-Karabakh War, during which time he participated in the hostilities and was awarded the title of "For Courage".

== Personal life ==
On 11 March 2014, he was detained by the Security Service of Ukraine.
