= Stepan Bandera monument in Lviv =

Statue completed in October 2007

Stepan Bandera monument
- Пам'ятник Степанові Бандері
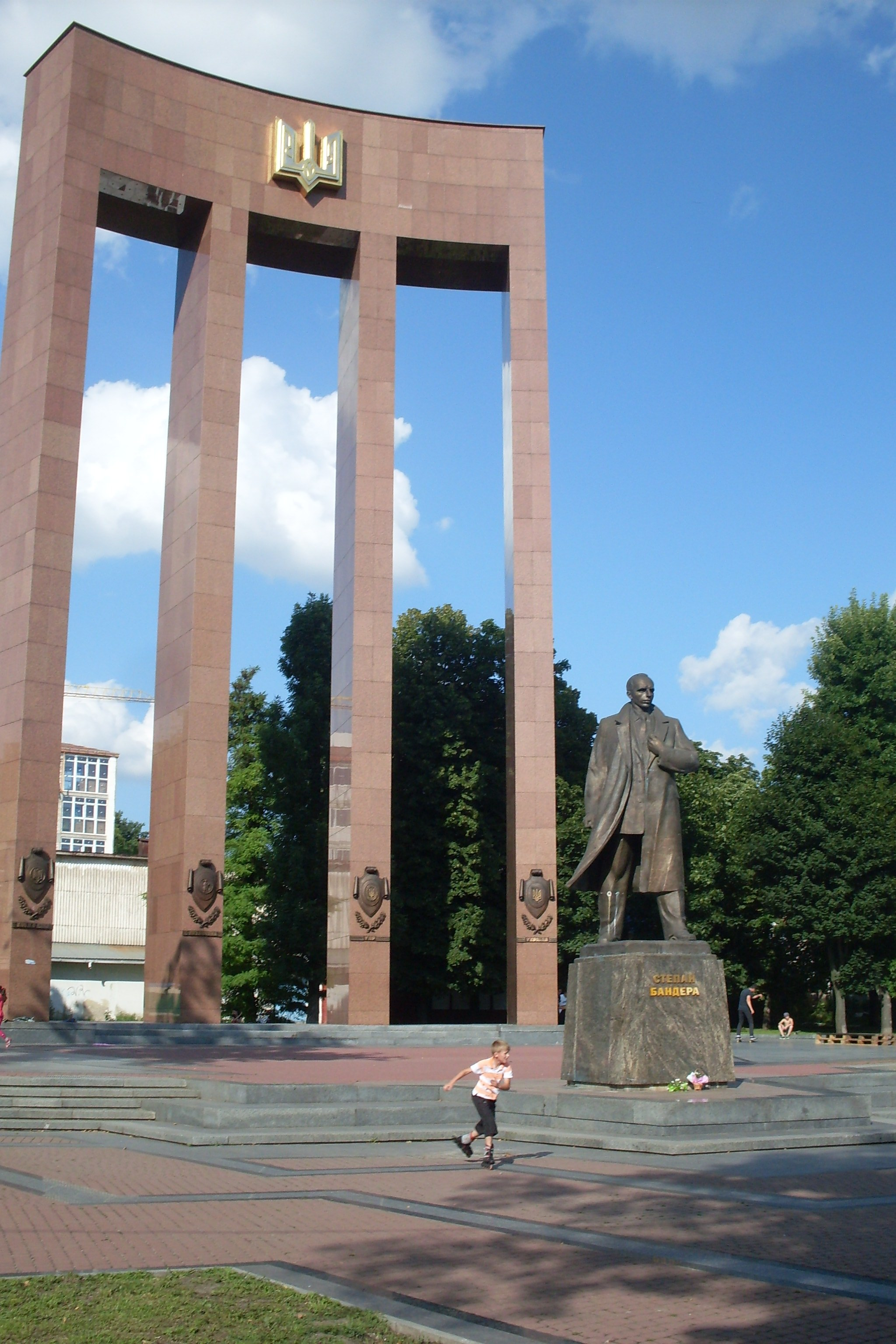
- Stepan Bandera monument
- Interactive map of Stepan Bandera monument
- Location: Kropyvnytskyi square, Lviv, Lviv Oblast, Ukraine
- Coordinates: 49°50′9.5″N 24°0′20.5″E
- Builder: Ukrainian Government
- Material: Granite
- Beginning date: 2003
- Completion date: 13 October 2007

The Stepan Bandera monument in Lviv, which stands in front of the Stele of Ukraine Monument, is a statue dedicated to nationalist leader, Stepan Bandera, a far-right leader of the OUN-B and a Ukrainian symbol of nationalism, in the city of Lviv, one of the main cities of Western Ukraine.

The figure stands in front of the Stele of Ukrainian Statehood. The monument was unveiled in 2007, for the eve of the holiday of the Intercession of the Theotokos.

== Background ==
The Statue in Lviv was part of increased Ukrainian Nationalism in Western Ukraine that led to recognition of Stepan Bandera as a National hero.

Bandera was a Ukrainian nationalist leader born in 1909, imprisoned in Poland in his twenties for terrorism, freed by the Nazis in 1939 following the invasion of Poland, and arrested again by the Gestapo in 1941, spending most of the rest of the war in a concentration camp. After the war, he settled in exile in West Germany, where he was assassinated in 1959 by KGB agents.

Stepan Bandera has also been cast as a Nazi collaborator. However, many Ukrainians hail him as a national hero or as a martyred liberation fighter.

The history of Stepan Bandera is hard to separate from fact or fiction. It was illegal to discuss or research Bandera and the OUN-B in the Russia, Poland, and Ukraine until the fall of Soviet Union. A constant tension defining Bandera as a hero and villain has existed since 1944 but has increased with lead up to war in Ukraine.

== The monument ==
The monument stands 7 meters tall. Behind it is the Stele of Ukrainian Statehood—a 30-meter-tall (98 ft) triumphal arch with 4 columns, each column symbolizing a different period of the Ukrainian statehood. The first one—Kievan Rus', the second—the Cossack Hetmanate, the third—the Ukrainian People's Republic, and the fourth—the modern, independent Ukraine.

External image
- The monument in 2010

Planning for the project began in 1993. Funding of the statue was provided by Lviv Oblast and veterans of the UPA. Due to a shortage of funds only the statue was revealed for the 65th Anniversary.

A design competition was held in 2002 and sculptor Mykola Posikira and architect Mykhailo Fedyk won from a total of seven entries. Construction began in 2003.

== Controversy ==
Stepan Bandera is seen as a hero to some and a Nazi collaborator to others. Much of this controversy emerged after the fall of the Soviet Union and increased Ukrainian Nationalism as part of Independence and growing tension before the Russia's invasion of Ukraine. Stepan Bandera as National symbol became prominent in Western Ukraine while Russian media drew connections to historical ties the UPA and OUN-B had with Nazi Germany.

Critics of Bandera as a national symbol point to the role of the UPA in the massacre of 100,000 Polish people Volhynia and Eastern Galicia during World War Two. Stepan Bandera the faction of the Organization of Ukrainian Nationalists (OUN-B). On 30 June 1941, shortly after Lviv came under the control of Nazi Germany in the early stages of the Axis invasion of the Soviet Union, the OUN-B declared an independent Ukrainian state in the city. OUN members subsequently took part in the Lviv pogroms.

== See also ==
- Monuments to Stepan Bandera
- Hero of Ukraine medal
- Neo-Nazism in Ukraine
