= Staryi Uhryniv =

Village in Ivano-Frankivsk Oblast, Ukraine

Staryi Uhryniv Старий Угринів
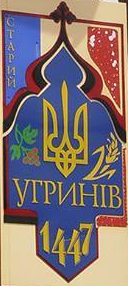
- Flag Coat of arms

- Location in Ukraine Ivano-Frankivsk Oblast Location in Ukraine
- Coordinates: 48°56′42″N 24°22′17″E
- Country: Ukraine
- Oblast: Ivano-Frankivsk Oblast
- Raion: Kalush Raion

Area
  - Total: 7.51 km^{2} (2.90 sq mi)
- Elevation: 335 m (1,099 ft)

Population
  - Total: 1,010
  - Density: 134/km^{2} (348/sq mi)
- Time zone: UTC+2 (EET)
  - Summer (DST): UTC+3 (EEST)
- Postal code: 77362
- Area code: +380 3472

Staryi Uhryniv (Ukrainian: Старий Угринів, Polish: Uhrynów Stary) is a village in Kalush Raion, Ivano-Frankivsk Oblast, western Ukraine. The local government is administered by Serednouhrynivska village council. It belongs to Novytsia rural hromada, one of the hromadas of Ukraine.

== History ==
The first mention of Staryi Uhryniv is in 1447. Villagers are known to have taken part in the Khmelnytsky Uprising of 1648.

== Religion ==
- Church of the Entry into Jerusalem (1924, wooden, UGCC)

== Notable people ==
- Stepan Bandera (1909–1959), Ukrainian nationalist leader
