= Stepan Bandera =

Ukrainian nationalist leader (1909–1959)

- Степан Бандера
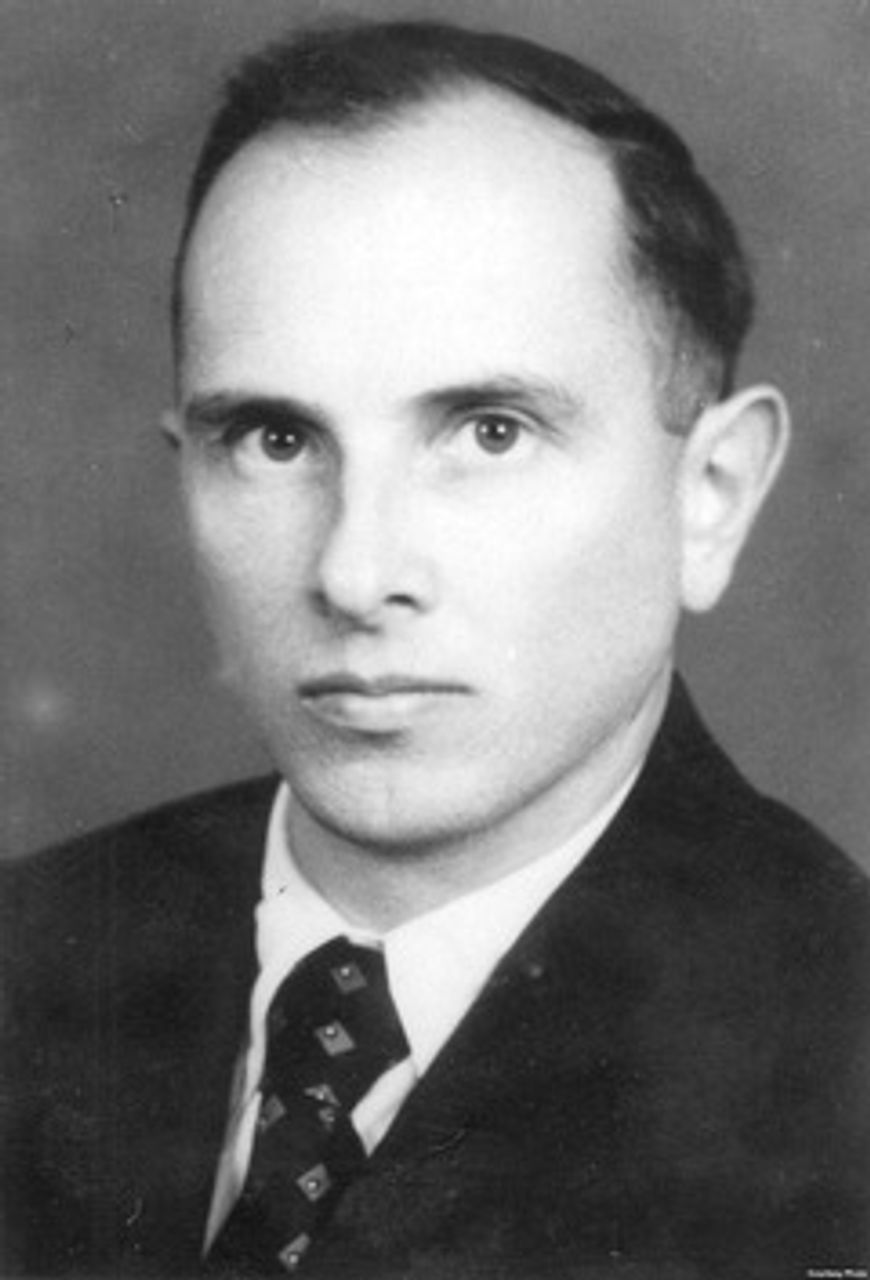
- Bandera, c. 1934

Leader of the Organisation of Ukrainian Nationalists (Banderite)
- In office 10 February 1940 – 15 October 1959
- Preceded by: Position established (Andriy Melnyk as leader of the OUN)
- Succeeded by: Stepan Lenkavskyi

Personal details
- Born: 1 January 1909 Staryi Uhryniv, Austria-Hungary (now in Ukraine)
- Died: 15 October 1959 (aged 50) Munich, Bavaria, West Germany
- Cause of death: Assassination by cyanide gas
- Resting place: Munich Waldfriedhof
- Spouse: Yaroslava Bandera
- Relations: Ołeksandr Bandera (brother); Vasyl Bandera (brother)
- Children: 3
- Parents: Andriy Bandera (father); Myroslava Glodzinska (mother)
- Education: Lviv Polytechnic
- Awards: Hero of Ukraine (annulled)

Military service
- Allegiance: OUN (1929–1940); OUN-B (1940–1959)
- Battles/wars: World War II

Stepan Andriiovych Bandera (1 January 1909 – 15 October 1959) (Note: Ukrainian: Степа́н Андрі́йович Банде́ра, IPA: [steˈpɑn ɐnˈd⁽ʲ⁾r⁽ʲ⁾ijowɪtʃ bɐnˈdɛrɐ]; Polish: Stepan Andrijowycz Bandera) was a Ukrainian far-right leader of the radical militant faction of the Organization of Ukrainian Nationalists, the OUN-B.

Bandera was born into the family of a Ukrainian Greek Catholic priest in the Austro-Hungarian region of Galicia, which after World War I became part of Poland. Involved in nationalist organisations from a young age, he joined the Ukrainian Military Organisation in 1924. In 1931, he became head of propaganda of the Organisation of Ukrainian Nationalists (OUN), and later became head of the OUN for Poland in 1932. In 1934, he organised the assassination of the Polish interior minister, Bronisław Pieracki, for which he was sentenced to death for terrorism, subsequently commuted to life imprisonment.

During the invasion of Poland in 1939, Bandera left custody amidst the turmoil, moving on to Kraków. In 1940, the OUN split into two factions with Bandera leading the more radical faction, the OUN-B, in opposition to the OUN-M. Bandera's OUN-B was devoted to the establishment of an independent Ukrainian state, envisioned by him as "a one-party fascist dictatorship free of national minorities" according to Timothy Snyder. On 22 June 1941, the day that Nazi Germany invaded the Soviet Union, Bandera formed the Ukrainian National Committee. Its head, Yaroslav Stetsko, announced the creation of a Ukrainian state on 30 June 1941, in German-captured Lviv. The proclamation pledged to work with Nazi Germany. Germany disapproved of the proclamation and, for his refusal to rescind it, Bandera was arrested by the Gestapo and sent to the Sachsenhausen concentration camp in January 1942. The Germans released him in September 1944, in the hope that he could fight the Soviet advance. In March 1945, Bandera negotiated with the Nazis to create the Ukrainian National Army and the Ukrainian National Committee. After the war, Bandera settled with his family in West Germany, where, in 1959, he was assassinated by Bohdan Stashynsky, a KGB agent in Munich.

Bandera remains a highly controversial figure. In the post-war Soviet Union, "Banderite" became a common slur for Ukrainian nationalists. This usage persists to this day in neighbouring Russia under Vladimir Putin. On 22 January 2010, Viktor Yushchenko, the president of Ukraine, awarded Bandera the posthumous title of Hero of Ukraine, which was internationally condemned. The award was annulled in 2011 under Yushchenko's successor Yanukovych. Bandera's controversial legacy gained further prominence following the full-scale Russian invasion of Ukraine in February 2022. Opinion polling following the invasion indicated an increase in favourable views of Bandera in Ukraine.

== Biography ==
=== Early life and education ===
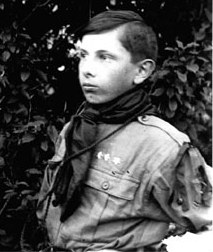
Young Bandera in the Plast uniform, 1923

Stepan Bandera was born on 1 January 1909 in Staryi Uhryniv, in the region of Galicia in Austria-Hungary, to Ukrainian Greek Catholic Church priest Andriy Bandera (1882–1941) and Myroslava Głodzińska (1890–1921). Bandera had seven siblings: three sisters and four brothers. Bandera's younger brothers included Oleksandr, who earned a doctorate in political economy at the University of Rome, and Vasyl, who finished a degree in philosophy at the University of Lviv.

Bandera grew up in a patriotic and religious household. He did not attend primary school due to World War I and was taught at home by his parents. At a young age, Bandera was undersized and slim. He sang in a choir, played guitar and mandolin, enjoyed hiking, jogging, swimming, ice skating, basketball and chess.

After the dissolution of Austria-Hungary in the wake of World War I, Eastern Galicia briefly became part of the West Ukrainian People's Republic. Bandera's father, who joined the Ukrainian Galician Army as a chaplain, was active in the nationalist movement preceding the Polish–Ukrainian War, which was fought between November 1918 to July 1919 and ended with Ukrainian defeat and incorporation of Eastern Galicia into Poland.

Mykola Mikhnovsky's 1900 publication, Independent Ukraine, influenced Bandera greatly. After graduating from a Ukrainian high school in Stryi in 1927, where he was engaged in a number of youth organizations, Bandera planned to attend the Husbandry Academy in Czechoslovakia, but he either did not get a passport or the Academy notified him that it was closed. In 1928, Bandera enrolled in the agronomy program at the Politechnika Lwowska in its branch in Dubliany, but never completed his studies due to his political activities and arrests.

=== Early activities ===
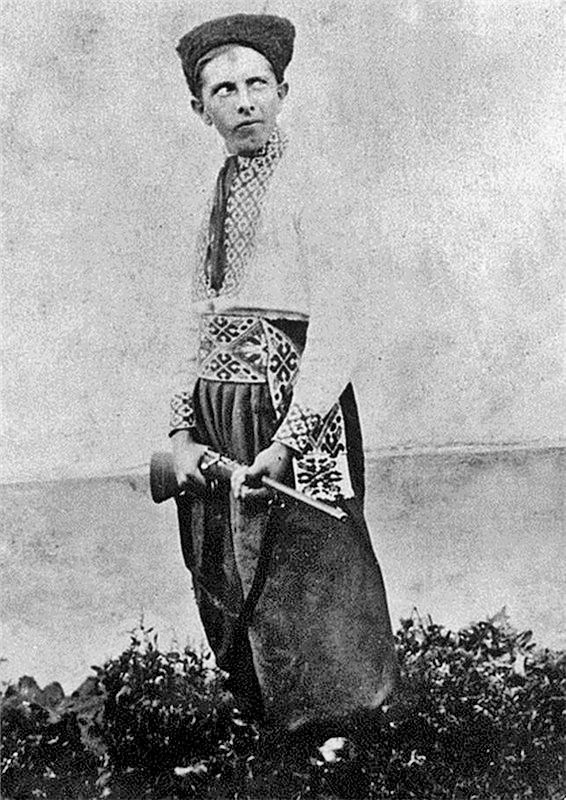
Bandera in folkloristic Cossack costume

Bandera associated himself with a variety of Ukrainian organisations during his time in high school, particularly Plast, Sokil, and Organisation of the Upper Grades of the Ukrainian High Schools (OVKUH). In 1927 Bandera joined Ukrainian Military Organization (UVO). In February 1929 he joined Organisation of Ukrainian Nationalists (OUN). Bandera was drawn into national activity by Stepan Okhrymovych, one of the leaders of the Ukrainian youth movement.

During his studies, he devoted his efforts to underground and nationalist activities, for which he was arrested several times. The first time was on 14 November 1928, for illegally celebrating the 10th anniversary of the ZUNR; in 1930 with his brother Andrii; and in 1932-33 as many as six times. Between March and June 1932, he spent three months in prison in connection with the investigation of the assassination of Emilian Czechowski by Iurii Berezynskyi.

In the early 1930s, in response to attacks perpetrated by Ukrainian nationalists, Polish authorities carried out the pacification of Ukrainians in Eastern Galicia against the Ukrainian minority. This resulted in destroyed property and mass detentions, and took place in southeastern voivodeships of the Second Polish Republic.

=== Organisation of Ukrainian Nationalists ===
Bandera joined OUN in 1929 and quickly climbed through the ranks, thanks to the support of Okhrymovych, becoming in 1930 the head of a section distributing OUN propaganda in Eastern Galicia. A year later, he became director of propaganda for the whole OUN. After Okhrymovych's death and the flight from Poland of his successor Ivan Habrusevych in 1931, he became the leading candidate to become head of the homeland executive. But due to the fact that he was in detention at the time, he was unable to assume this function, and upon his release, he became deputy to Bohdan Kordiuk, who assumed this function. After the failure of the attack on the post office in Gródek Jagielloński, Kordiuk had to step down and Bandera took over de facto his function, which was sanctioned at a conference in Berlin on 3–6 June 1933.

On 29 August 1931, Polish politician Tadeusz Hołówko was assassinated by two members of the OUN Vasyl Bilas and Dmytro Danylyshyn. Both were sentenced to death. Bandera-led OUN propaganda made them martyrs and ordered Ukrainian priests in Lviv and elsewhere to ring bells on the day of their execution.

Since 1932, Bandera was assistant chief of OUN and around that time controlled several "warrior units" in Poland in places such as the Free City of Danzig (Wolne Miasto Gdańsk), Drohobycz, Lwów, Stanisławów, Brzezany, and Truskawiec. Bandera collaborated closely with Richard Yary, who would later side with Bandera and help him form OUN-B.

On Bandera's orders OUN began a campaign of terrorist acts, such as attacks on post-offices, bomb-throwing at Polish exhibitions and murders of policemen to mass campaigns against Polish tobacco and alcohol monopolies and against the denationalization of Ukrainian youth. In 1934, Bandera was arrested in Lwów and tried twice: first, concerning involvement in a plot to assassinate the minister of internal affairs, Bronisław Pieracki, and second at a general trial of OUN executives. He was convicted of terrorism and sentenced to death. The death sentence was commuted to life imprisonment.

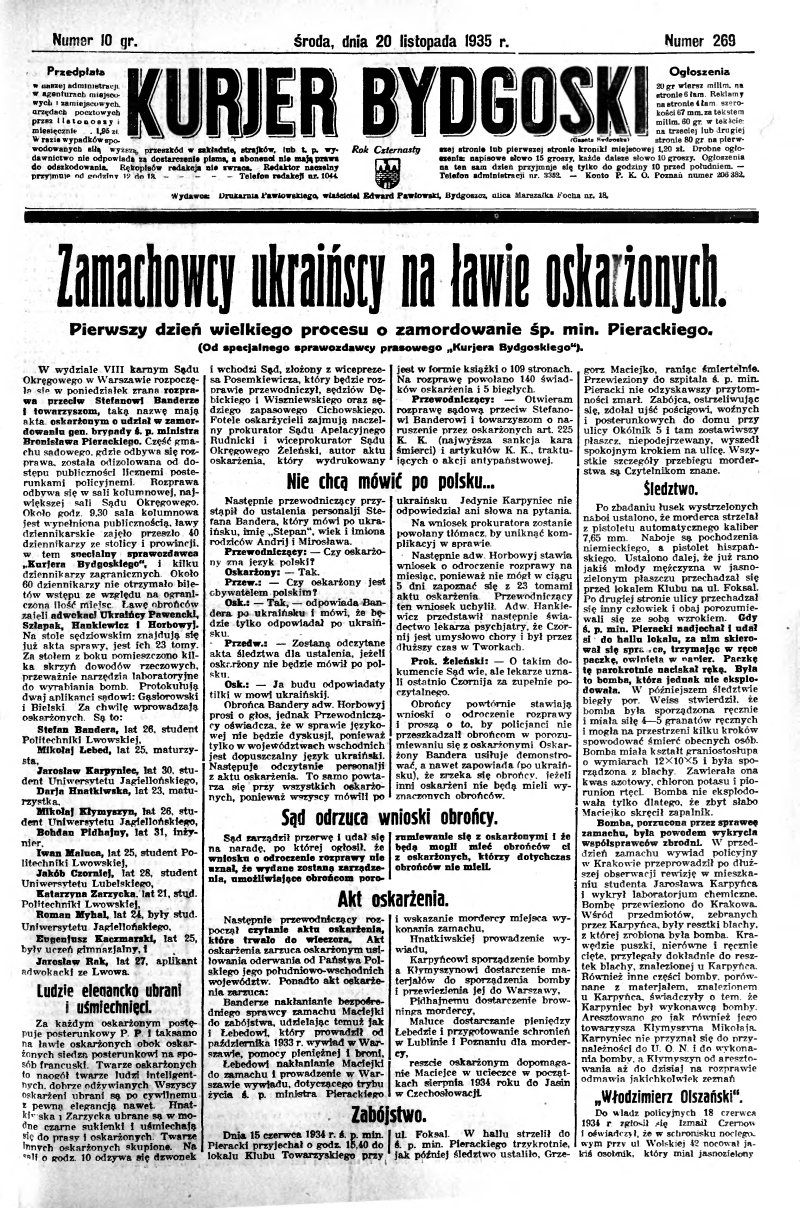
Press report from the trial of Bandera and his associates for the murder of Polish minister Bronisław Pieracki, 20 November 1935

After the trials, Bandera became renowned and admired among Ukrainians in Poland and abroad as a symbol of a revolutionary who fought for Ukrainian independence. While in prison, Bandera was "to some extent detached from OUN discourses" but not completely isolated from the global political debates of the late 1930s thanks to Ukrainian and other newspaper subscriptions delivered to his cell.

=== World War II ===
Before World War II the territory of today's Ukraine was split between Poland, the Soviet Union, Romania and Czechoslovakia. Prior to the 1939 invasion of Poland, German military intelligence recruited OUN members into the Bergbauernhilfe unit and smuggled Ukrainian nationalists into Poland in order to erode Polish defences by conducting a terror campaign directed at Polish farmers and Jews. OUN leaders Andriy Melnyk (code name Consul I) and Bandera (code name Consul II) both served as agents of the Nazi Germany military intelligence Abwehr Second Department. Their goal was to run diversion activities after Germany's attack on the Soviet Union. This information is part of the testimony that Abwehr Colonel Erwin Stolze gave on 25 December 1945 and submitted to the Nuremberg trials, with a request to be admitted as evidence.

Bandera was freed from Brest (Brześć) Prison in Eastern Poland in early September 1939, as a result of the invasion of Poland. There are differing accounts of the circumstances of his release. (Note: According to some accounts and sources, Bandera was released, or walked out of prison. According to others, he escaped. According to Snyder, he was released due to Poland freeing its political prisoners to spare them German captivity. According to Bandera's own account, he escaped on 13 September 1939, with the help of Ukrainian prisoners in the turmoil of World War II. In her book Borderland, author Anna Reid states that Germans freed him, but her sources for that are unclear.) Soon thereafter Eastern Poland was occupied by the Soviet Union. Upon release from prison, Bandera moved first to Lviv, but after realising it would be occupied by the Soviets, Bandera together with other OUN members, moved to Kraków, the capital of Germany's occupational General Government. where, according to Tadeusz Piotrowski, he established close connections with the German Abwehr and Wehrmacht. There, he also came in contact with the leader of the OUN, Melnyk. In 1940, the political differences and expectations between the two leaders caused the OUN to split into two factions, OUN-B and OUN-M (Banderites and Melnykites), each one claiming legitimacy.

The factions differed in ideology, strategy and tactics: the OUN-M faction led by Melnyk preached a more conservative approach to nation-building, while the OUN-B faction, led by Bandera, supported a revolutionary approach; however, both factions exhibited similar levels of radical nationalism, fascism, antisemitism, xenophobia and violence. The vast majority of young OUN members joined Bandera's faction. OUN-B was devoted to the independence of Ukraine, as a single-party fascist dictatorship free of national minorities. (Note: Bandera aimed to make of Ukraine a one-party fascist dictatorship without national minorities. UPA partisans murdered tens of thousands of Poles, most of them women and children; some Jews who had taken shelter with Polish families were also killed. He was also later responsible for the ethnic cleansing of Poles, pogroms against Jews, and implicated in collaboration with Nazi Germany.) It was later implicated in the Holocaust. (Note: "It is a sad comment on Ukrainian memory that the man declared a Hero of Ukraine in January headed a movement that was deeply involved in the Holocaust.")

Before the independence proclamation of 30 June 1941, Bandera oversaw the formation of so-called "Mobile Groups" (Ukrainian: мобільні групи), which were small (5–15 members) groups of OUN-B members who would travel from General Government to Western Ukraine and, after a German advance to Eastern Ukraine, encourage support for the OUN-B and establish local authorities run by OUN-B activists. In total, approximately 7,000 people participated in these mobile groups, and they found followers among a wide circle of intellectuals, such as Ivan Bahriany, Vasyl Barka, Hryhorii Vashchenko and many others.

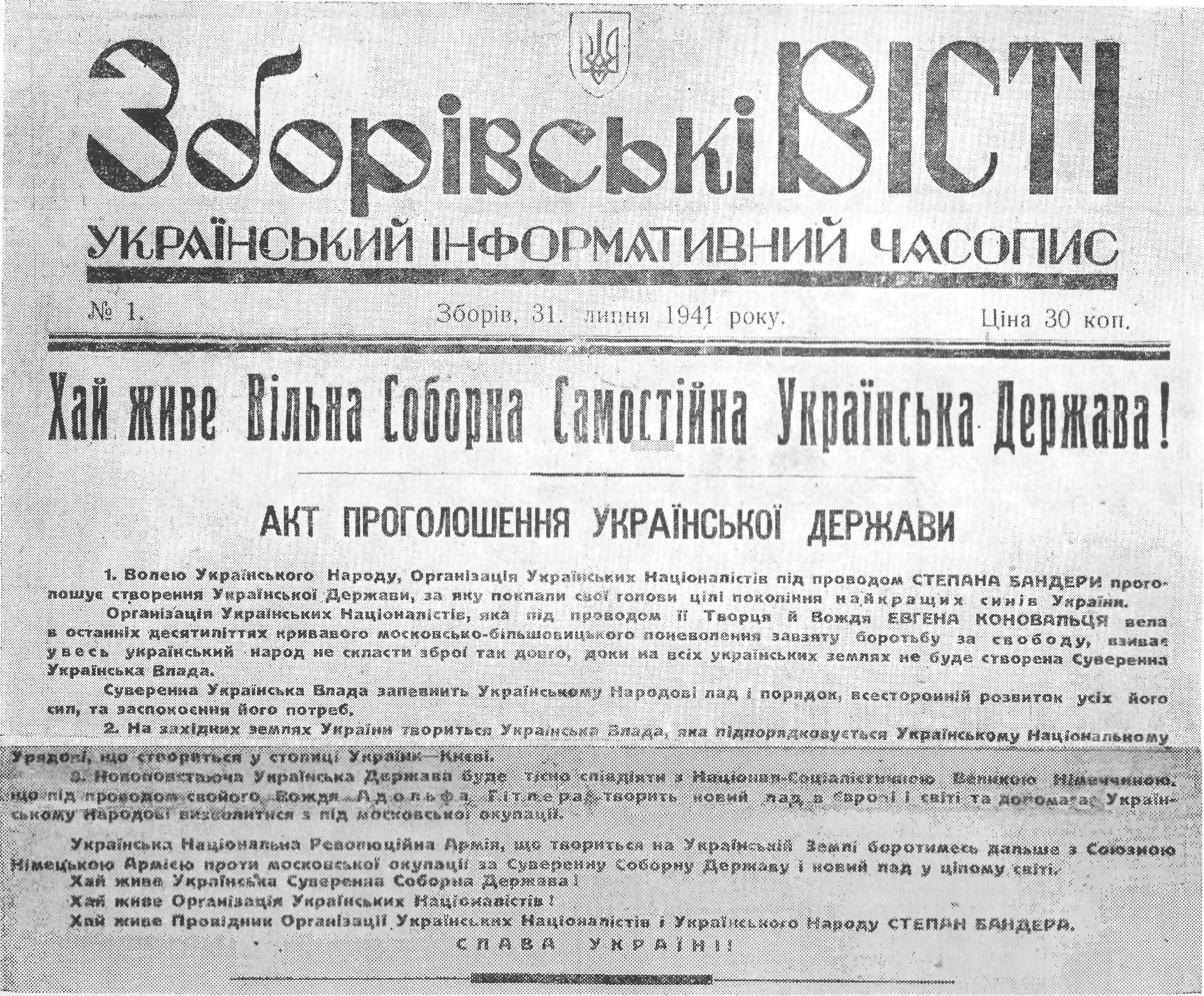
Declaration of the Ukrainian state, 30 June 1941

In spring 1941, Bandera held meetings with the heads of Germany's intelligence, regarding the formation of "Nachtigall" and "Roland" Battalions. In the spring of that year, the OUN received 2.5 million marks for subversive activities inside the Soviet Union. Gestapo and Abwehr officials protected Bandera's followers, as both organisations intended to use them for their own purposes.

On 30 June 1941, with the arrival of Nazi troops in Ukraine, the OUN-B unilaterally declared an independent Ukrainian state ("Act of Renewal of Ukrainian Statehood"). The proclamation pledged a cooperation of the new Ukrainian state with Nazi Germany under the leadership of Hitler. The declaration was accompanied by violent pogroms. There is no evidence that Bandera actively supported or participated in the Lviv pogroms or acts of violence against Jewish and Polish civilians, but he was well informed about the violence and was "unable or unwilling to instruct Ukrainian nationalist military troops (as Nachtigall, Roland and UPA) to protect vulnerable minorities under their control". As German historian Olaf Glöckner writes, Bandera "failed to manage this problem (ethnic and anti-Semitic hatred) inside his forces, just like Symon Petljura failed 25 years before him."

OUN(b) leaders' expectation that the Nazi regime would post-factum recognize an independent fascist Ukraine as an Axis ally proved to be wrong. German authorities requested that the declaration be withdrawn, but Stetsko and Bandera refused. The Germans barred Bandera from moving to newly conquered Lviv, limiting his residency to occupied Kraków. On 5 July, Bandera was brought to Berlin, where he was placed in honourable captivity. On 12 July, the prime minister of the newly formed Ukrainian National Government, Yaroslav Stetsko, was arrested and taken to Berlin. Although released from custody on 14 July, both were required to stay in Berlin. Bandera was free to move around the city, but could not leave it. The Germans closed OUN-B offices in Berlin and Vienna, and on 15 September 1941 Bandera and leading OUN members were arrested by the Gestapo.

By the end of 1941, relations between Nazi Germany and the OUN-B had soured to the point where a Nazi document dated 25 November 1941 stated that "the Bandera Movement is preparing a revolt in the Reichskommissariat which has as its ultimate aim the establishment of an independent Ukraine. All functionaries of the Bandera Movement must be arrested at once and, after thorough interrogation, are to be liquidated".

In January 1942, Bandera was transferred to Sachsenhausen concentration camp's special prison cell building (Zellenbau) for high-profile political prisoners such as Horia Sima, the chancellor of Austria, Kurt Schuschnigg or Stefan Grot-Rowecki and high-risk escapees. Bandera was not completely cut off from the outside world; his wife visited him regularly and was able to help him keep in touch with his followers. In April 1944, Bandera and his deputy Yaroslav Stetsko were approached by a Reich Security Main Office official to discuss plans for diversions and sabotage against the Soviet Army.

Bandera's release was preceded by lengthy talks between the Germans and the UPA in Galicia and Volhynia. Local talks and agreements took place as early as the end of 1943, talks at the central level of the OUN-B began in March 1944 and ended with the conclusion of an informal agreement in August or September 1944. The talks from the OUN-B Provid side were led mainly by Ivan Hrynokh. Meanwhile, in July 1944, the formation of the Ukrainian Supreme Liberation Council (UHVR) took place, which was intended as a supra-party organisation that constituted the civilian body overseeing the UPA and was intended as the supreme authority in Ukraine. In reality, only members or sympathizers of the OUN-B took part in its formation. Kyrylo Osmak became president of the UHVR, but real power rested in the hands of the General Secretariat, headed by Roman Shukhevych. At the congress, decisions were made to stop any open collaboration with the Germans, creating a government alongside them was excluded, only taking supplies from them was considered. It was planned to carry out partisan fighting in the rear of the approaching Soviet army. A decision was also taken to move away from radically nationalist rhetoric towards greater democratisation. A UHVR foreign mission led by Mykola Lebed was sent to establish contact with Western governments.

On 28 September 1944, Bandera was released by the German authorities and moved to house arrest. Shortly after, the Germans released some 300 OUN members, including Stetsko and Melnyk. The release of OUN members was one of the few successes of Lebed's mission on behalf of the UHVR, which failed to establish contacts with the Western Allies. Bandera reacted negatively to the changes taking place within the OUN-B in Ukraine. His opposition was provoked by the 'democratisation' of the OUN-B and, above all, the relegation of the former leadership of the organisation to purely symbolic roles. On 5 October 1944, SS-Obergruppenführer Gottlob Berger met with Bandera and offered him the opportunity to join Andrey Vlasov and his Russian Liberation Army, which Bandera rejected. In December 1944, the Abwehr moved Bandera and Stetsko to Kraków in order to prepare the Ukrainian unit to be parachuted to the rear of the Soviet army. From there, they sent Yurii Lopatynskyi as a courier to Shukhevych. Bandera informed him that he was ready to return to Ukraine, while Stetsko informed him that he still considered himself the Ukrainian prime minister.

Lopatynskyi arrived to Shukhevych in early January 1945. At a meeting of the Provid on 5 and 6 February 1945, it was decided that Bandera's return to Ukraine was pointless, and that it might be more beneficial for him to remain in the West, where, as a former Nazi prisoner, he could organize support of international opinion. Bandera was re-elected as leader of the whole OUN. Roman Shukhevych resigned as the leader of the OUN and became the leader of OUN in Ukraine and Bandera's deputy. The leaders of the OUN in Ukraine also came to the conclusion that the German-Soviet war would soon end in a Soviet victory, and a decision was made to continue the fight against the Soviets with smaller units, in order to maintain the will to fight among the population. It was also decided to hold talks with the Polish underground to conclude an anti-Soviet alliance. At that point, the cooperation with Germans basically ceased with the loss of direct contact and the front moving further west.

In January, Bandera was in Lehnin, west of Berlin. Later he went to Weimar, where he took part in the formation of the Ukrainian National Committee (UNK) as one of the leaders alongside Pavlo Shandruk, Volodymyr Kubijovyč, Andriy Melnyk, Oleksandr Semenko and Pavlo Skoropadsky. In March, the UNK appointed Shandrukh as commander of the newly formed Ukrainian National Army (UNA), which was to fight the Soviets alongside the Germans; the Waffen-SS Galizien division was incorporated. Bandera later denied in conversations with the CIA that he had been involved in the formation of these organisations or any collaboration with Germany after his release. In February 1945, at a conference of the OUN-B in Vienna, Bandera was made the leader of the Foreign Units of the OUN (ZCh OUN). It was there that he openly criticised for the first time the changes that had taken place in the OUN-B in Ukraine. With the Red Army approaching, Bandera left Vienna and travelled to Innsbruck via Prague.

=== Postwar activity ===
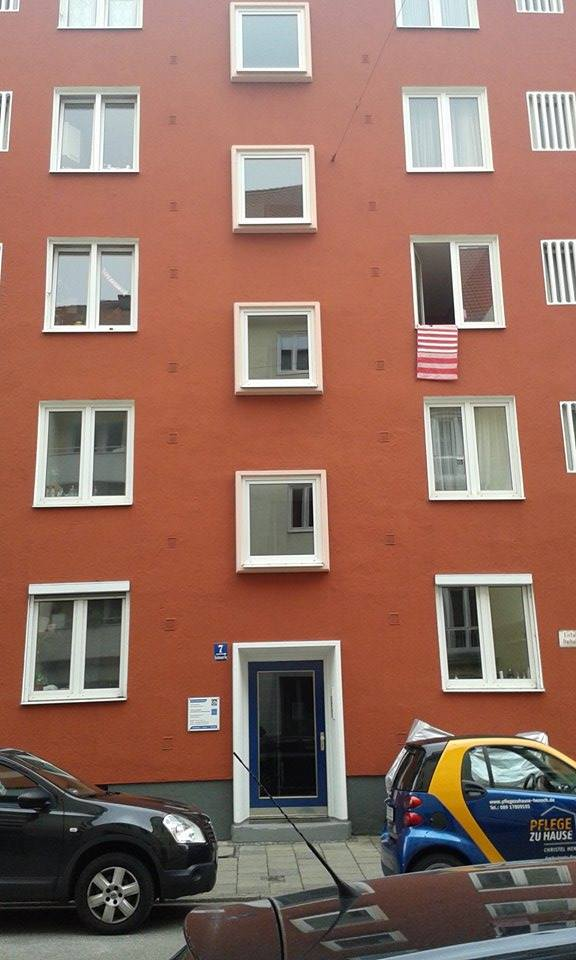
Kreittmayrstraße 7 in Munich, where Bandera lived at the time of his assassination

After the war, Bandera and his family moved several times around West Germany, staying close to and in Munich, where Bandera organised the ZCh OUN centre. He used false identification documents that helped him to conceal his past relationship with the Nazis. On 16 April 1946, the Yaroslav Stetsko-led Anti-Bolshevik Bloc of Nations was founded, with which Bandera also collaborated. The ZCh OUN quickly became the largest organisation in the approximately 110,000-strong Ukrainian diaspora in Germany, with 5,000 members. Part of the organisation was the SB security service, headed by Myron Matviyenko. The OUN-M was three times smaller. The foreign representation of the UHVR (ZP UHVR), led by Mykola Lebed, operated separately from the ZCh OUN, but many of its members belonged to both organisations.

As early as 1945, ZCh had established contacts with Western intelligence; from 1948 onwards, it had permanent cooperation with British intelligence, which helped to transfer couriers to Ukraine in return for receiving intelligence data. ZP UHVR, collaborated with the US intelligence. A September 1945 report by the US Office of Strategic Services said that Bandera had "earned a fierce reputation for conducting a 'reign of terror' during World War II". Bandera was protected by the US-backed Gehlen Organization but he also received help from underground organizations of former Nazis who helped Bandera to cross borders between Allied occupation zones.

In 1946, agents of the US Army intelligence agency Counterintelligence Corps (CIC) and NKVD entered into extradition negotiations based on the wartime intra-Allied cooperation agreement made at the Yalta Conference. The CIC wanted Frederick Wilhelm Kaltenbach, who would turn out to be deceased, and in return, the Soviet Union proposed Bandera. Bandera and many Ukrainian nationalists had ended up in the American zone after the war. The Soviet Union regarded all Ukrainians as Soviet citizens and demanded their repatriation under the intra-Allied agreement. The US thought Bandera was too valuable to give up due to his knowledge of the Soviet Union, so the US started blocking his extradition under an operation called "Anyface". From the perspective of the US, the Soviet Union and Poland were issuing extradition attempts of these Ukrainians to prevent the US from getting sources of intelligence, so this became one of the factors in the breakdown of the cooperation agreement. However, the CIC still considered Bandera untrustworthy and were concerned about the effect of his activities on Soviet-American relations, and in mid-1947 conducted an extensive and aggressive search to locate him. It failed, having described their quarry as "extremely dangerous" and "constantly en route, frequently in disguise". Some American intelligence reported that he even was guarded by former SS men.

The Bavarian state government initiated a crackdown on Bandera's organisation for crimes such as counterfeiting and kidnapping. Gerhard von Mende, a West German government official, provided protection to Bandera, who in turn provided him with political reports, which were relayed to the West German Foreign Office. Bandera reached an agreement with the BND, offering them his service, despite the CIA warning the West Germans against cooperating with him.

Following the war, Bandera also visited Ukrainian communities in Canada, Austria, Italy, Spain, Belgium, the UK, and Holland. Bandera remained in contact with Dmytro Dontsov throughout the 1950s, visiting him in Canada and offering him the role of editor in his organization's newspaper which Dontsov declined.

== Death ==
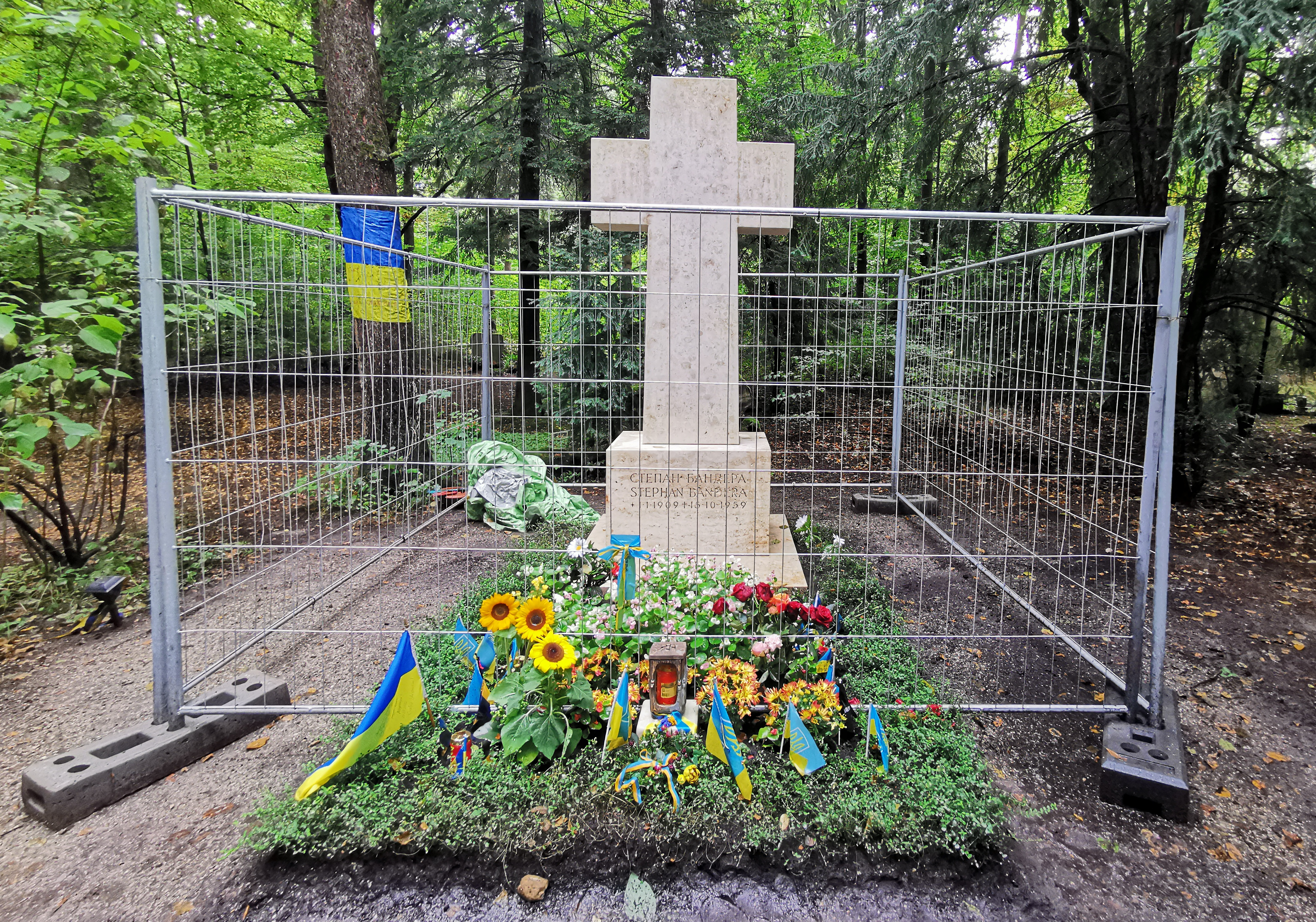
Bandera's grave in Munich, July 2022

The MGB, and from 1954, the Soviet KGB, had attempted to kidnap or assassinate Bandera multiple times. On 15 October 1959, Bandera was returning to his apartment at Kreittmayrstrasse 7 in Munich, where he collapsed and died shortly thereafter. A medical examination established that the cause of his death was poisoning by cyanide gas. On 20 October 1959, Bandera was buried in the Waldfriedhof (lit. 'woodland cemetery') in Munich. His wife and three children moved to Toronto, Canada.

Two years after his death, on 17 November 1961, the German judicial bodies announced that Bandera's murderer had been a KGB agent named Bohdan Stashynsky who used a cyanide dust spraying gun to murder Bandera acting on the orders of Soviet KGB head Alexander Shelepin and Soviet premier Nikita Khrushchev. After a detailed investigation against Stashynsky, who by then had defected from the KGB and confessed the killing, a trial took place from 8 to 15 October 1962. Stashynsky was convicted, and on 19 October, he was sentenced to eight years in prison; he was released after four years.

Stashynsky had earlier assassinated Bandera's associate Lev Rebet by similar means.

== Family ==
Bandera's brothers, Oleksandr and Vasyl, were arrested by the Germans and sent to Auschwitz concentration camp, where they were allegedly killed by Polish inmates in 1942.

His father Andriy was arrested by the Soviets in late May 1941 for harbouring an OUN member and transferred to Kyiv. On 8 July, he was sentenced to death and executed on the 10th. His sisters, Oksana and Marta–Maria, were arrested by the NKVD in 1941 and sent to a gulag in Siberia. Both were released in 1960 without the right to return to Ukraine. Marta–Maria died in Siberia in 1982, and Oksana returned to Ukraine in 1989, where she died in 2004. Another sister, Volodymyra, was sentenced to a term in Soviet labour camps from 1946 to 1956. She returned to Ukraine in 1956.

== Views ==
According to historian Grzegorz Rossoliński-Liebe, "Bandera's worldview was shaped by numerous far-right values and concepts including ultranationalism, fascism, racism, and antisemitism; by fascination with violence; by the belief that only war could establish a Ukrainian state; and by hostility to democracy, communism, and socialism. Like other young Ukrainian nationalists, he combined extremism with religion and used religion to sacralize politics and violence." Historian Timothy Snyder described Bandera as a politician who "aimed to make of Ukraine a one-party fascist dictatorship without national minorities". (Note: "The incoming Ukrainian president will have to turn some attention to history, because the outgoing one has just made a hero of a long-dead Ukrainian fascist. By conferring the highest state honour of 'Hero of Ukraine' upon Stepan Bandera ... Bandera aimed to make of Ukraine a one-party fascist dictatorship without national minorities. During World War II, his followers killed many Poles and Jews.") Historian John-Paul Himka writes that Bandera remained true to the fascist ideology to the end. Historian Per Anders Rudling said that Bandera and his followers "advocated the selective breeding to create a 'pure' Ukrainian race", and that "the OUN shared the fascist attributes of anti-liberalism, anti-conservatism, and anti-communism, an armed party, totalitarianism, antisemitism, Führerprinzip, and adoption of fascist greetings. Its leaders eagerly emphasized to Hitler and Ribbentrop that they shared the Nazi Weltanschauung and a commitment to a fascist New Europe."

Historian Taras Hunczak argues that Bandera's central article of faith was Ukrainian statehood, and any other goal was secondary to this view. Through an analysis of OUN documents, Hunczak demonstrates the consistently expressed goal of an independent Ukrainian state through the whole history, while the OUN's stance towards the German Nazi government was changing, shifting from initial support towards rejection, as OUN leaders became disillusioned seeing Nazi Germany's rejection of Ukrainian independence. The OUN memorandum from 23 June 1941 notes that "German troops entering Ukraine will be, of course, greeted at first as liberators, but this attitude can soon change, in case Germany comes into Ukraine without appropriate promises of [its] goal to reestablish the Ukrainian state." The OUN memorandum from 14 August declares the OUN wish "to work together with Germany not from opportunism, but from a realization of the need of such cooperation for the well-being of Ukraine". Hunczak observes OUN leaders', including Bandera, attitude change after 15 September 1942, following Gestapo's killing of an OUN member, prompting the OUN to use the rhetoric of "German occupier" in reference to Nazi regime.

Political scientist Andreas Umland described Bandera merely as a "Ukrainian ultranationalist", noting he was not a "Nazi" and commenting that Ukrainian nationalism was "not a copy of Nazism". Political scientist Luboš Veselý criticises Rossoliński-Liebe's book on Bandera as intentionally painting him and all Ukrainian nationalists negatively. Per Veselý, Rossoliński-Liebe "considers nationalism in general to be closely related to fascism" and fails to put Ukrainian nationalism, as well as antisemitism and fascist movements, in the context of their rise in other European countries at the time. The book does not mention arguments of other renowned Ukrainian historians, such as Heorhii Kasianov. Veselý says that "Bandera was against closer cooperation with the Nazis and he insisted that the Ukrainian national movement should not be dependent on anyone", thus opposing Rossoliński-Liebe's conclusion that Ukrainian nationalists needed the protection of Nazi Germany and therefore collaborated with them. Veselý concludes that all of this makes Rossoliński-Liebe's assessment of Bandera as a "condemnable symbol of Ukrainian fascism, antisemitism, terrorism and an inspiration for anti-Jewish pogroms and even genocide" "an abusive oversimplification, uprooting events and people from the context of the era or using harsh, unfounded and emotional judgments."

Historian David R. Marples described Bandera's views as "not untypical of his generation" but as holding "an extreme political stance that rejected any form of cooperation with the rulers of Ukrainian territories: the Poles and the Soviet authorities". Marples also described Bandera as "neither an orator nor a theoretician", and wrote that he had minimal importance as a thinker. Marples considered Rossolinski-Liebe to place too much importance on Bandera's views, writing that Rossolinski-Liebe struggled to find anything of note written by Bandera, and had assumed he was influenced by "publicists of the time" like Dmytro Dontsov and OUN journals.

Ukrainian historian Oleksandr Zaitsev notes that Rossolinski-Liebe's approach ignores "the fundamental differences between ultra-nationalist movements of nations with and without a state". Zaitsev highlights that the OUN did not identify itself with fascism, but "officially objected to this identification". Zaitsev suggests that it would be more correct to see the OUN and Bandera as the revolutionary ultranationalist movements of stateless nations, which were aiming not on "the reorganization of the existing state according to totalitarian principles, but to create a new state, using all available means, including terror, to this end." According to Zaitsev, Rossolinski-Liebe omits some facts, which do not fit into his "a priori scheme of 'fascism', 'racism' and 'genocidal nationalism'", and denies "the presence of liberatory and democratic elements" in Bandera movement. On these grounds, mainly on the goal of the OUN and Bandera to create an independent state, Zaitsev terms Bandera's movement not as fascism, but as ustasism after the Croatian far-right Ustashe movement, which he finds similar to the OUN. According to Zaitsev, ustasism is proto-fascist in its core and "becomes transformed into a 'full-fledged' fascism" when the main goal of creating a state is achieved.

Historian Dr Raul Cârstocea, too, finds Rossoliński-Liebe's association of Bandera with fascism problematic, for one of the reasons Rossoliński-Liebe's used definition of fascism being too wide.

=== Views towards Poles and Jews ===
Marples says that Bandera "regarded Russia as the principal enemy of Ukraine, and showed little tolerance for the other two groups inhabiting Ukrainian ethnic territories, Poles and Jews". In late 1942, when Bandera was in a German concentration camp, his organisation, the Organization of Ukrainian Nationalists, was involved in a massacre of Poles in Volhynia. In early 1944, ethnic cleansing also spread to Eastern Galicia. It is estimated that more than 35,000 and up to 60,000 Poles, mostly women and children, along with unarmed men, were killed during the spring and summer campaign of 1943 in Volhynia, and up to 133,000 in other regions, such as Eastern Galicia, are included.

Though not directly responsible for the 1943 and 1944 massacres since he was being held in Sachsenhausen concentration camp and not in control of the OUN-B at the time, Rossoliński-Liebe wrote that as head of OUN propaganda from 1931 to 1934 and de facto leader of the OUN-B from 1940 to 1941, Bandera had promulgated and propagandised violence towards Poles and other "ethnic and political enemies", in pursuit of an ethnically homogenous Ukrainian state, and Bandera never condemned the massacres in the post-war years. According to Yaroslav Hrytsak, Bandera was not completely aware of events in Ukraine during his internment from the summer of 1941 and had serious differences of opinion with Mykola Lebed, the OUN-B leader who remained in Ukraine and who was one of the chief architects of the massacres of Poles.

According to Rossolinski-Liebe, Bandera developed antisemitic views in the interwar years, influenced by antisemitism present among Ukrainian nationalists at that time, and Marples described Bandera as showing "little tolerance" for Jews. Speaking about Bandera and his men, political scientist Alexander John Motyl told Tablet that antisemitism was not a core part of Ukrainian nationalism in the way it was for Nazism, and the Soviet Union and Poland were considered to be the primary enemies of the OUN. According to him, the attitude of the Ukrainian nationalists towards Jews depended on political circumstances, and they considered Jews to be a problem because "they weren't Ukrainian", and were "implicated, or believed to be implicated" in aiding the Soviets in taking Ukrainian territory. Norman Goda wrote that "Historian Karel Berkhoff, among others, has shown that Bandera, his deputies, and the Nazis shared a key obsession, namely the notion that the Jews in Ukraine were behind Communism and Stalinist imperialism and must be destroyed."

On 10 August 1940, Bandera wrote a letter to Andriy Melnyk saying that he would accept Melnyk's leadership of the OUN, provided he expelled "traitors" in the leadership. One of these was Mykola Stsiborskyi, whom Bandera accused of an absence of "morality and ethics in family life" due to having married a Jewish woman, and especially, a "suspicious" Russian Jewish woman.

Historian Andrii Portnov argues that "Bandera did not participate personally in the underground war conducted by the Ukrainian Insurgent Army (UPA), which included the organised ethnic cleansing of the Polish population of Volhynia in north-western Ukraine and killings of the Jews, but he also never condemned them." Similarly, Rossolinski-Liebe and Umland both observe that Bandera personally had no part in the murders of Jews. Rossolinski-Liebe said "he had found no evidence that Bandera supported or condemned 'ethnic cleansing' or killing Jews and other minorities. It was, however, important that people from OUN and UPA 'identified with him.'" However, Bandera was aware of at least some of his followers' anti-Jewish violence: In June 1941, Yaroslav Stetsko sent Bandera a report in which he stated "We are creating a militia which will help to remove the Jews and protect the population."

According to Rossoliński-Liebe, "After the Second World War and the Holocaust, both Bandera and his admirers were embarrassed by the vehement antisemitic component of their interwar political views and denied it systematically."

== Legacy ==
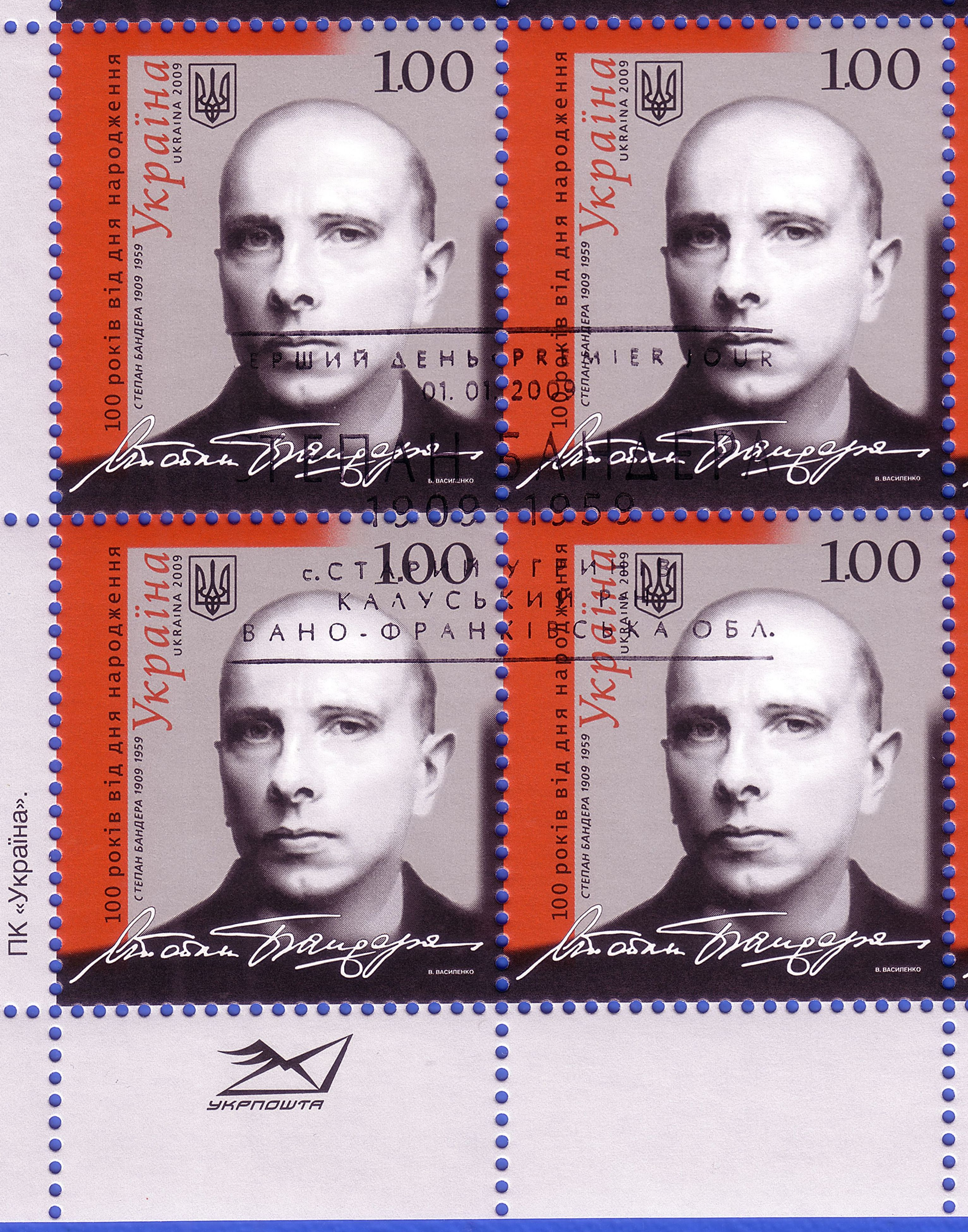
Ukrainian postal stamp commemorating the centennial of Bandera's birth

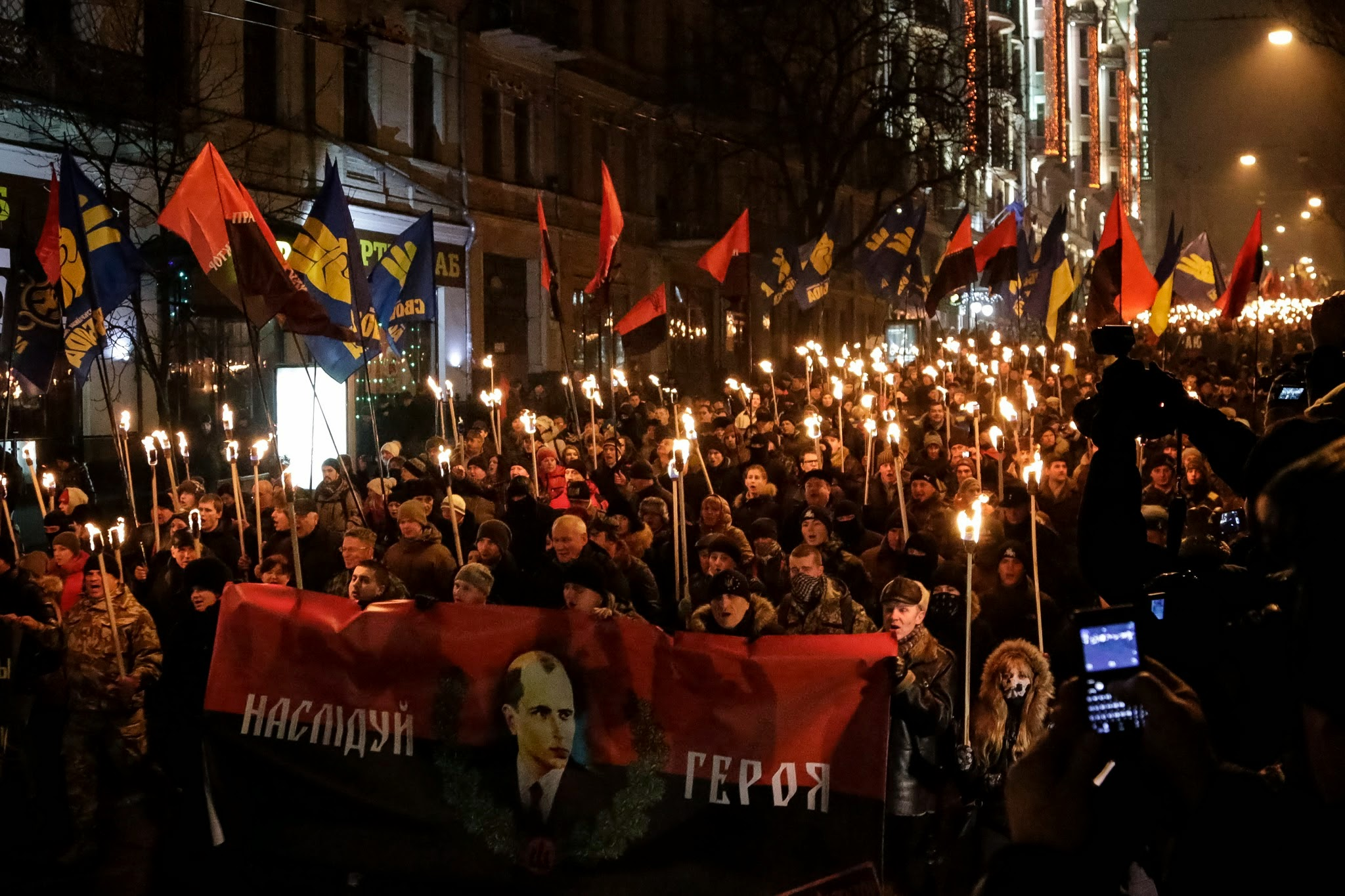
Ukrainian nationalists marching through Kyiv, holding a banner with Bandera's portrait, as well as the flags of the Right Sector and Svoboda

During the Soviet period, "Banderite" was a common slur for any Ukrainian nationalist, regardless of their individual attitude to Bandera. This usage persists to this day in Russia under Vladimir Putin. Russia heavily promoted the theme of "denazification", and used rhetoric that was similar to Soviet era policy of equating the development of Ukrainian national identity with Nazism due to Bandera's collaboration, which has a particular resonance in Russia. In his 2006 article discussing "the reinterpretations of [Bandera's] career", historian David R. Marples, who specialises in the history of this area of Eastern Europe, stated that "the impact of Bandera lies less in his own political life and beliefs than in the events enacted in his name, or the conflicts that arose between his supporters and their enemies." According to The Guardian, "Post-war Soviet history propagated the image of Bandera and the UPA as exclusively fascist collaborators and xenophobes." On the other hand, with the rise of nationalism in Ukraine, his memory there has been elevated. The glorification and attempts to rehabilitate Bandera are growing trends in Ukraine.

=== Cultural legacy ===
Bandera's figure was immensely popular in Western Ukraine starting from the late 1930s. His image as a fighter for popular freedom and Ukrainian statehood was reflected in various folk songs which emerged in the area during that period and described Bandera's trial, his activities as head of OUN, his role in the creation of UPA and his activities in emigration. Even some Christmas carols (koliadky) mentioned Bandera's name in connection with the hoped liberation of Ukraine from foreign domination. In total, over 30 Ukrainian folk songs about Bandera have been recorded.

After Ukraine declared its independence in 1991, the image of Bandera reentered mainstream Ukrainian culture following decades of Soviet suppression. That year the use of neologism Banderstadt (portmanteau of "Bandera" and German Stadt - "city") in respect to Lviv was popularized by Ukrainian rock band Braty Hadiukiny in their song My - khloptsi z Bandershtadtu ("We are Guys from Banderstadt"). Since 2007 an eponymous music festival has been organized in Ukraine. Several parodies of popular Soviet-era compositions, for example Cheremshyna, as well as Plast songs, also mention Bandera's name in their texts. Bandera was also mentioned in slogans used by fans of Ukrainian football clubs. In 2021 the popular song Batko nash Bandera, whose first records dated to 2019, entered trends of TikTok in Ukraine, being especially popular among the youth.

=== Commemoration ===
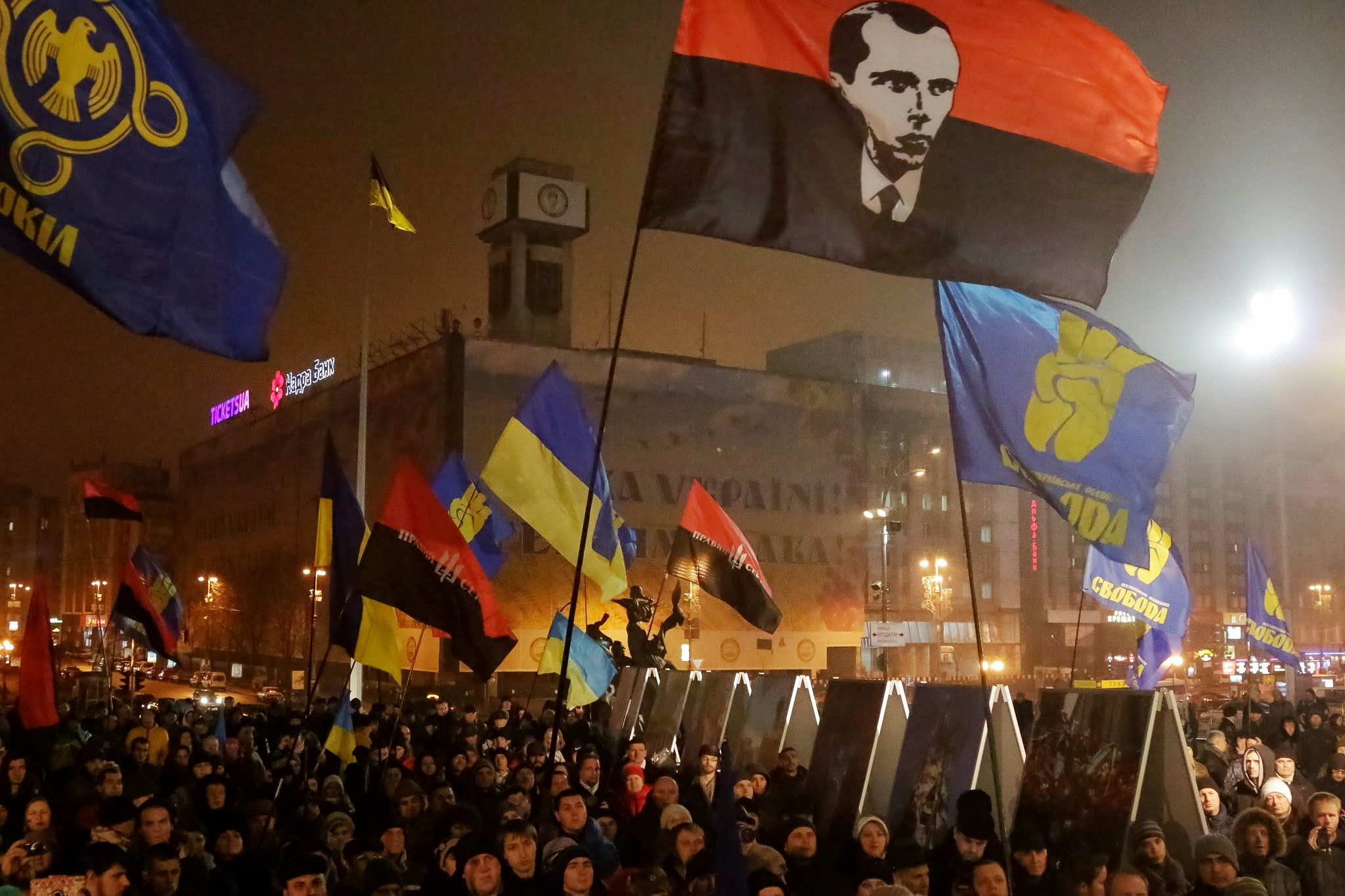
Torchlight procession in honor of the 106 anniversary of the birthday of Stepan Bandera, Kyiv, 1 January 2015

Neither Bandera nor OUN have been used as national symbols by the current Ukrainian government. Ukrainian president Zelenskyy has not presented Bandera or his associates as national heroes. Nevertheless, the memory of Bandera can be found in Ukraine.

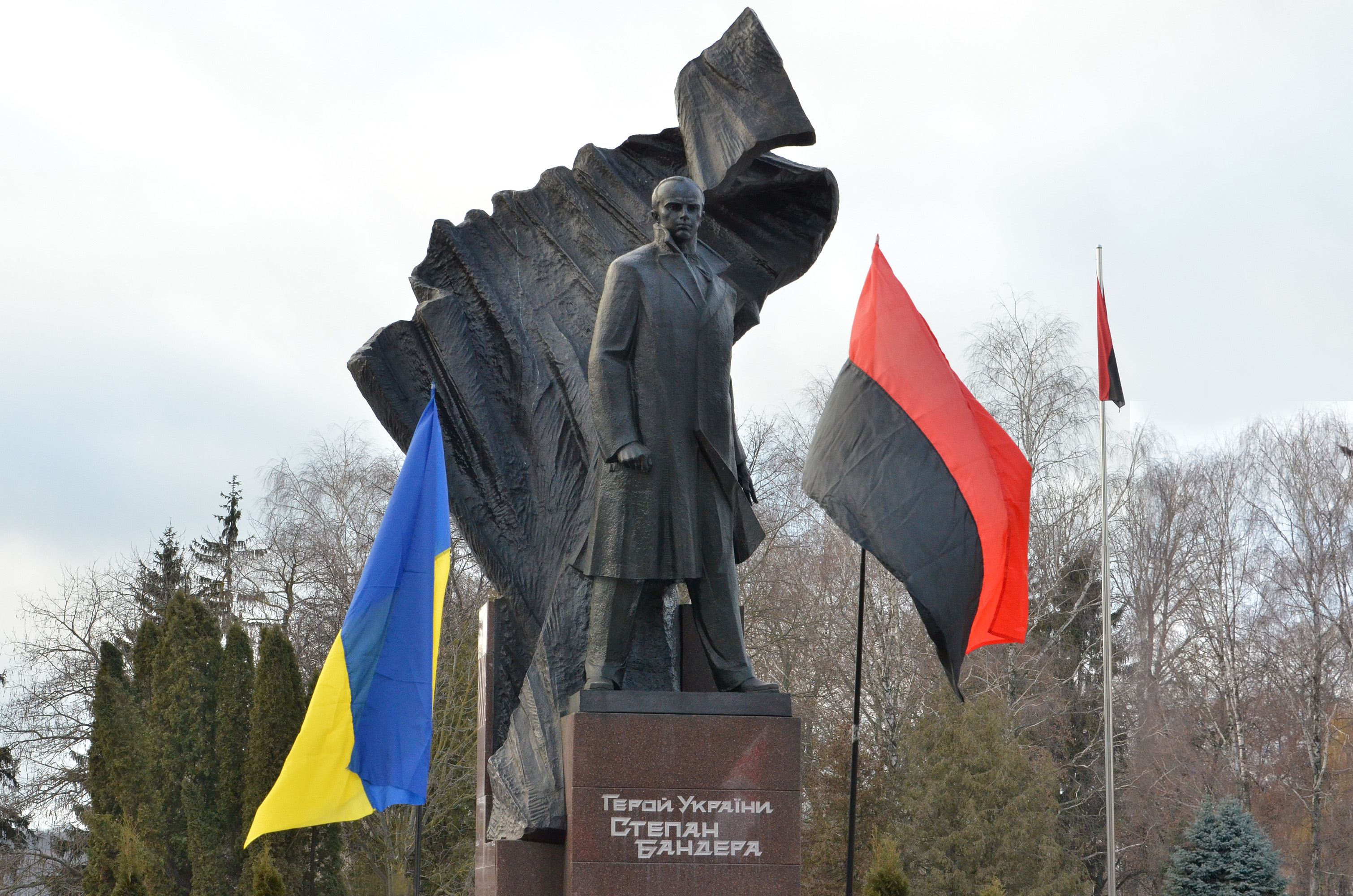
Bandera monument in Ternopil

In late 2006, the Lviv city administration announced the future transference of the tombs of Stepan Bandera, Andriy Melnyk, Yevhen Konovalets and other key leaders of OUN/UPA to a new area of Lychakiv Cemetery specifically dedicated to victims of the repressions of the Ukrainian national liberation struggle. In October 2007, the city of Lviv erected a statue dedicated to Bandera. On 18 October 2007, the Lviv City Council adopted a resolution establishing the Award of Stepan Bandera in journalism.

On 1 January 2009, his 100th birthday was celebrated in several Ukrainian centres and a postage stamp with his portrait was issued the same day. On 1 January 2014, Bandera's 105th birthday was celebrated by a torchlight procession of 15,000 people in the centre of Kyiv and thousands more rallied near his statue in Lviv. The march was supported by the far-right Svoboda party and some members of the center-right Batkivshchyna. In 2018, the Ukrainian Parliament voted to include Bandera's 110th birthday, on 1 January 2019, in a list of memorable dates and anniversaries to be celebrated that year. The decision was criticized by the Jewish organization Simon Wiesenthal Center.

There are Stepan Bandera museums in Dubliany, Volia-Zaderevatska, Staryi Uhryniv, and Yahilnytsia. There is a Stepan Bandera Museum of Liberation Struggle in London, part of the OUN Archive, and The Bandera Family Museum (Музей родини Бандерів) in Stryi. There are also Stepan Bandera streets in Lviv (formerly vulytsia Myru, "Peace street"), Lutsk (formerly Suvorovska street), Rivne (formerly Moskovska street), Kolomyia, Ivano-Frankivsk, Chervonohrad (formerly Nad Buhom street), Berezhany (formerly Cherniakhovskoho street), Drohobych (formerly Sliusarska street), Stryi, Kalush, Kovel, Volodymyr-Volynskyi, Horodenka, Dubrovytsia, Kolomyia, Dolyna, Iziaslav, Skole, Shepetivka, Brovary, and Boryspil, and a Stepan Bandera Avenue in Ternopil (part of the former Lenin Avenue). On 16 January 2017, the Ukrainian Institute of National Remembrance stated that of the 51,493 streets, squares and "other facilities" that had been renamed (since 2015) due to decommunization 34 streets were named after Stepan Bandera. Due to "association with the communist totalitarian regime", the Kyiv City Council on 7 July 2016 voted 87 to 10 in favor of supporting renaming Moscow Avenue to Stepan Bandera Avenue.

In Dnipro, the local Jewish community opposed renaming a street after Bandera, but after the start of the 2022 Russian invasion of Ukraine, they changed their stance and the street was renamed in September 2022; this street had originally been the Gymnasium Street until it was renamed to Otto Schmidt Street by Soviet authorities in 1934. In December 2022 after its recapture in a counteroffensive, the city of Izium decided to rename Pushkin Street to Stepana Bandera Street.

After the fall of the Soviet Union, monuments dedicated to Stepan Bandera have been constructed in a number of western Ukrainian cities and villages, including a statue in Lviv. In late 2018, the Lviv Oblast Council decided to declare the year of 2019 to be the year of Stepan Bandera, sparking protests by Israel. In 2021, the Ukrainian Institute of National Memory under the authority of the Ukrainian Ministry of Culture, included Bandera, among other Ukrainian nationalist figures, in Virtual Necropolis, a project intended to commemorate historical figures important for Ukraine.

=== Hero of Ukraine award ===
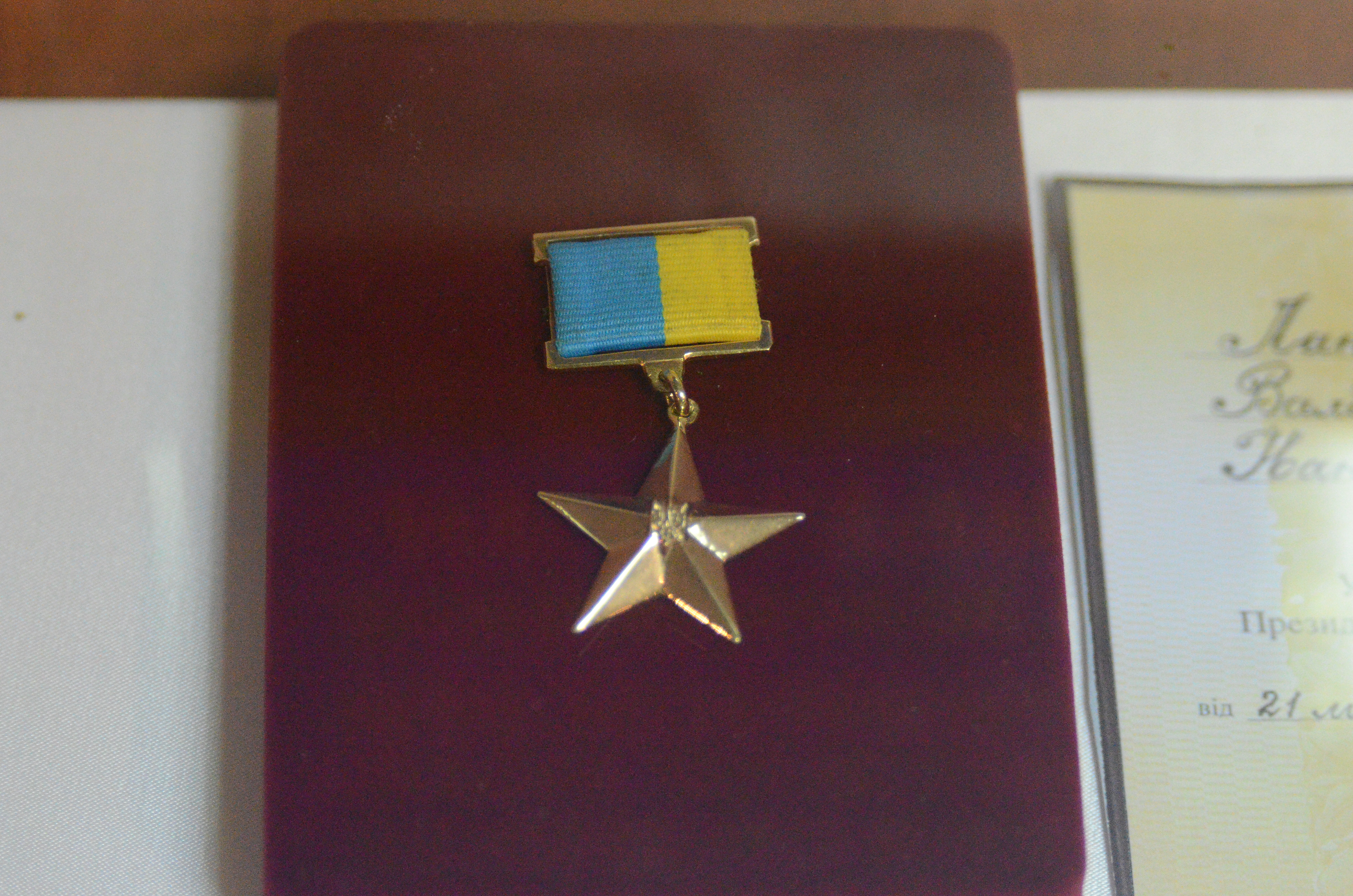
The Hero of Ukraine award

On 22 January 2010, on the Day of Unity of Ukraine, the then-president of Ukraine Viktor Yushchenko awarded to Bandera the title of Hero of Ukraine (posthumously) for "defending national ideas and battling for an independent Ukrainian state". Interfax-Ukraine reported that a grandson of Bandera, also named Stepan, accepted the award that day from the Ukrainian President during the state ceremony to commemorate the Day of Unity of Ukraine at the National Opera House of Ukraine.

Ukraine's "intellectuals with nationalist leanings" supported the designation, but liberals disapproved it. For them, Bandera "was too controversial", and was not uniting people but dividing them. They were opposing Bandera's radical nationalism and OUN's leadership's xenophobia and antisemitism. The designation let the pro-Russian politicians "to claim that the Orange camp had pro-Nazi sympathies". The move alienated the Polish allies, who are the main supporters of Ukraine joining the EU.

The European Parliament condemned the award, as did Russia, Poland, and Jewish politicians and organizations, such as the Simon Wiesenthal Center. On 25 February 2010, the European Parliament expressed hope the decision would be reconsidered. On the other hand, the decree was applauded by Ukrainian nationalists in western Ukraine.

After the 2010 Ukrainian presidential election, the succeeding president Viktor Yanukovych declared the award illegal, since Bandera was never a citizen of Ukraine, a stipulation necessary for getting the award. On 5 March 2010, Yanukovych stated that he would make a decision to repeal the decrees to honor the title of Heroes of Ukraine to Bandera and fellow nationalist Roman Shukhevych before the next Victory Day, although the Hero of Ukraine decrees do not stipulate the possibility that a decree on awarding this title can be annulled. On 2 April 2010, an administrative Donetsk region court ruled the presidential decree awarding the title to be illegal. According to the court's decision, Bandera was not a citizen of the Ukrainian Soviet Socialist Republic (vis-à-vis Ukraine).

On 5 April 2010, the Constitutional Court of Ukraine refused to start constitutional proceedings on the constitutionality of the Yushchenko decree the award was based on. A ruling by the court was submitted by the Supreme Council of the Autonomous Republic of Crimea on 20 January 2010. In January 2011, under Yanukovych's government, the presidential press service informed that the award was officially annulled. This was done after a cassation appeal filed against the ruling by Donetsk District Administrative Court was rejected by the Higher Administrative Court of Ukraine on 12 January 2011. Former president Yushchenko called the annulment "a gross error".

In December 2018, the Ukrainian parliament considered a motion to again confer the award on Bandera; the proposal was rejected in August 2019.

=== 2014 Russian intervention in Ukraine ===
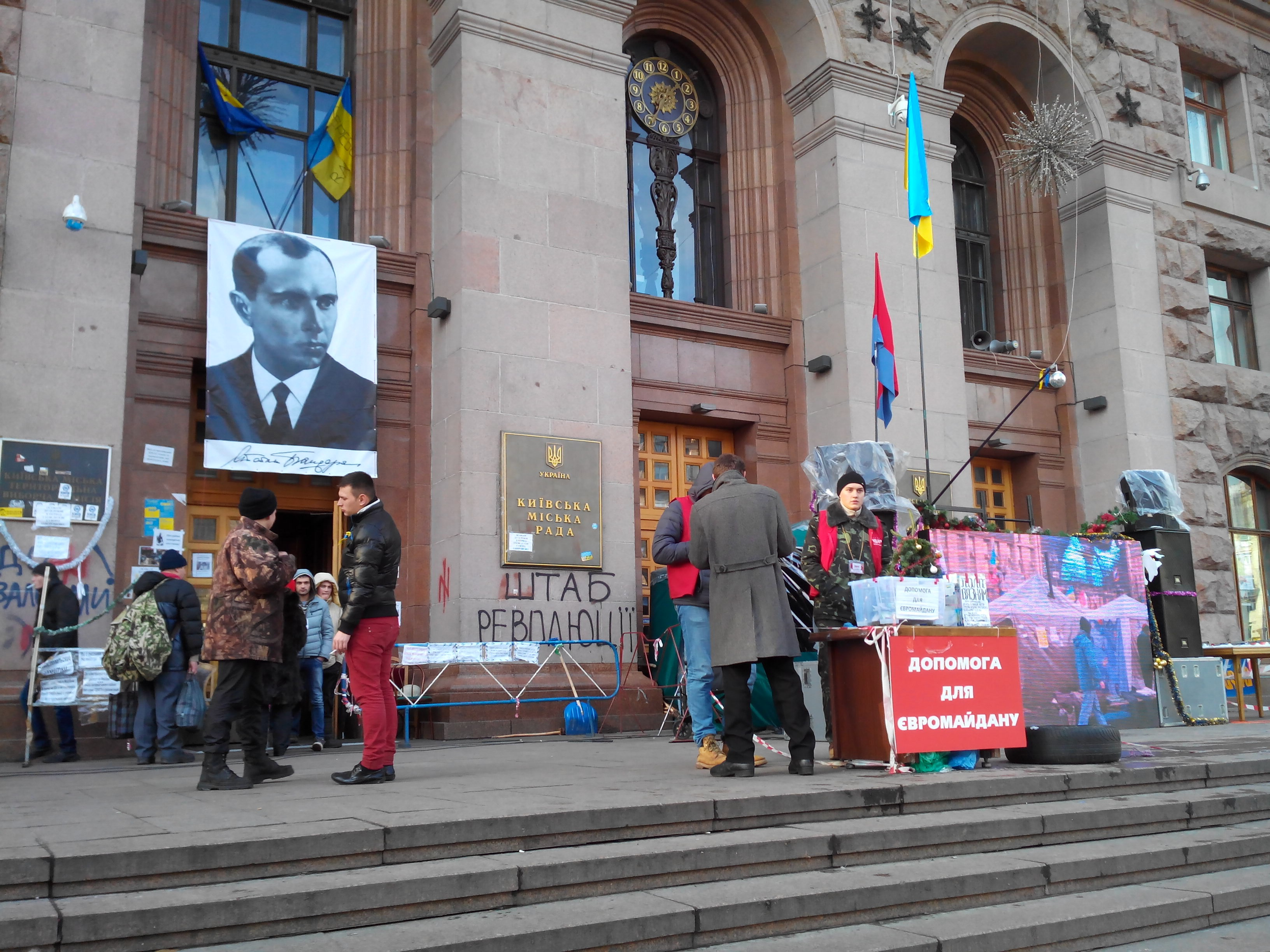
Headquarters of the Euromaidan, Kyiv, January 2014. At the front entrance, there is a portrait of Bandera.

During the 2014 Crimean crisis and unrest in Ukraine, pro-Russian Ukrainians, Russians (in Russia), and some Western authors alluded to the bad influence of Bandera on Euromaidan protesters and pro-Ukrainian Unity supporters in justifying their actions. According to The Guardian, "The term 'Banderite' to describe his followers gained a recent new and malign life when Russian media used it to demonise Maidan protesters in Kiev, telling people in Crimea and east Ukraine that gangs of Banderites were coming to carry out ethnic cleansing of Russians." Russian media used this to justify Russia's actions. Putin welcomed the annexation of Crimea by declaring that he "was saving them from the new Ukrainian leaders who are the ideological heirs of Bandera, Hitler's accomplice during World War II." Pro-Russian activists claimed: "Those people in Kyiv are Bandera-following Nazi collaborators." Ukrainians in Russia complained of being labelled "Banderites", even if they were from parts of Ukraine where Bandera is negatively remembered. A minority of people supporting Bandera views was presented in the Euromaidan protests, but Russian propaganda exaggerated their presence and demonized all Maidan protestors. Russian media even labeled "banderites" those 30,000 Russians who went to protest against Russian aggression in Ukraine on the Moscow March of Peace.

=== Russian invasion of Ukraine ===
During his invasion of Ukraine, Vladimir Putin made references to "Banderites" in his speeches and spoke of an inevitable confrontation with "neo-Nazis, Banderites" in his Victory Day speech. Russia heavily promoted the theme of "denazification", and used rhetoric that was similar to Soviet era policy of equating the development of Ukrainian national identity with Nazism due to Bandera's collaboration, which has a particular resonance in Russia. The Washington Post reported on Russian soldiers rounding up villagers who were deemed to be "Nazis" or "Banderites". Deutsche Welle reported that media in Ukraine included many eyewitness accounts of Russian soldiers looking for Bandera supporters, and that "whoever is deemed to be a supporter faces torture or death".

=== Attitudes in Ukraine towards Bandera ===
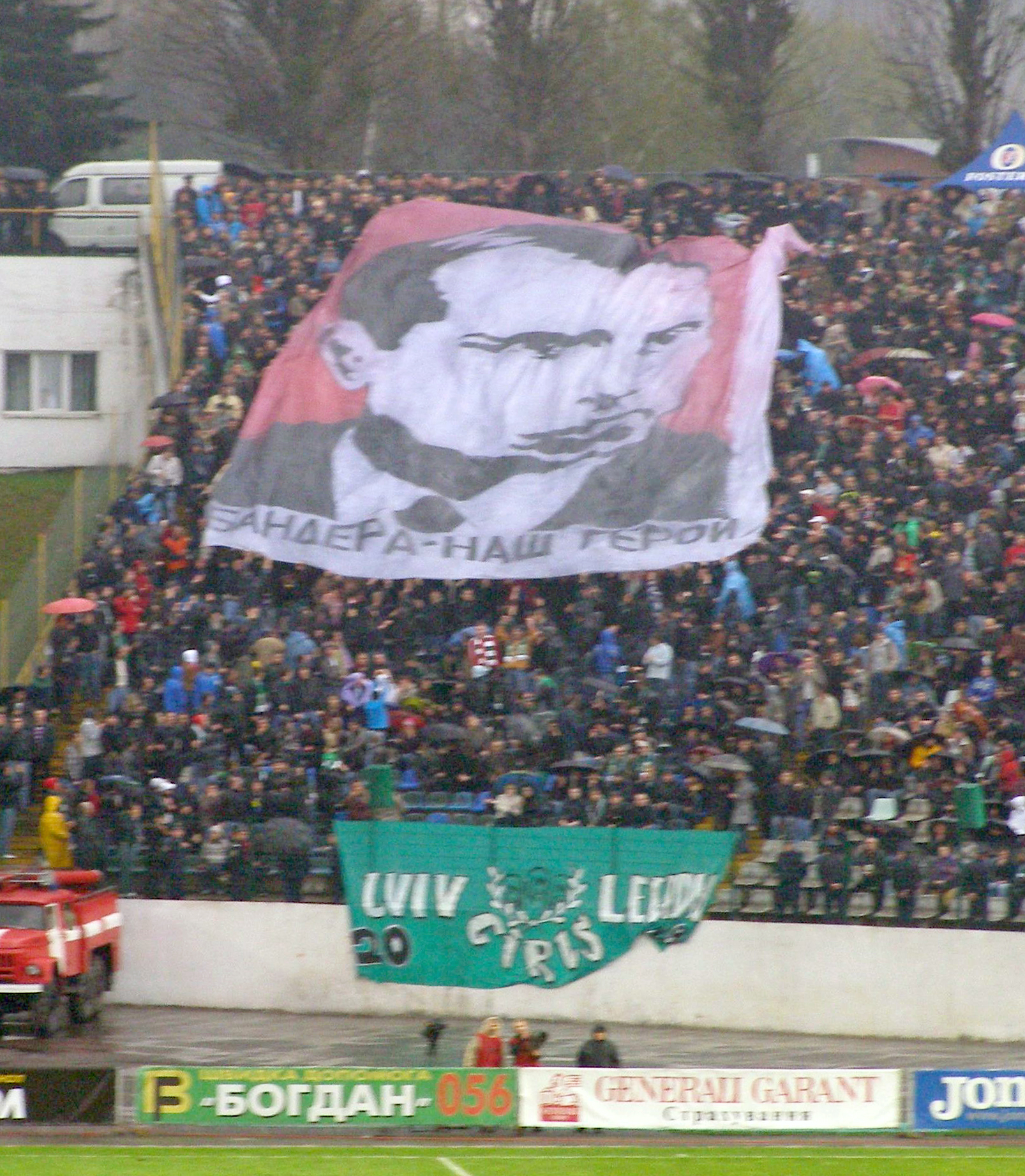
FC Lviv soccer fans at a game against FC Shakhtar Donetsk. The Ukrainian banner reads "Bandera – our hero".

A poll conducted in early May 2021 by the Democratic Initiatives Foundation together with the Razumkov Centre's sociological service showed that 32% of citizens considered Bandera's activity as a historical figure to be positive for Ukraine, as many considered his activity negative; another 21% consider Bandera's activities as positive as they are negative. According to the poll, a positive attitude prevailed in the western region of Ukraine (70%); in the central region of the state, 27% of respondents consider his activity positive, 27% consider his activity negative and 27% consider his activity both positive and negative; negative attitude prevails in the southern and eastern regions of Ukraine (54% and 48% of respondents consider his activity negative for Ukraine, respectively).

Following the Russian invasion of Ukraine, Bandera's favorability appeared to shoot up rapidly, with 74% of Ukrainians viewing him favourably according to an April 2022 poll from a Ukrainian research organisation. Bandera continued to cause friction with countries such as Poland and Israel. An August 2022 poll found almost 50% of Ukrainians now positively assessed "the role of historical figure of Stepan Bandera...for Ukraine". Historian Vyacheslav Likhachev told Haaretz that, for public consciousness in Ukraine, the only important thing about Bandera was that he fought for Ukrainian independence, and that other details are not important, especially in the context of events from 2014 onwards, where the struggle for Ukrainian independence became more prominent.

== See also ==
- Far-right politics in Ukraine
- Our father is Bandera, Ukraine is our mother!

== Bibliography ==
- Littman, Sol (2003). Pure Soldiers Or Sinister Legion: The Ukrainian 14th Waffen-SS Division. Black Rose Books. ISBN 978-1-55164-219-2.
- Marples, David R. (2006). "Stepan Bandera: The Resurrection of a Ukrainian National Hero". Europe-Asia Studies. 58 (4): 555–566. doi:10.1080/09668130600652118. ISSN 0966-8136. JSTOR 20451225. S2CID 144243956.
- Motyka, Grzegorz (2006). Ukraińska partyzantka 1942–1960 (in Polish). Warsaw: RYTM. ISBN 83-7399-163-8.
- Rossoliński-Liebe, Grzegorz (2014). Stepan Bandera: The Life and Afterlife of a Ukrainian Nationalist : Fascism, Genocide, and Cult. Ibidem-Verlag. ISBN 978-3-8382-0604-2.
- Rudling, Per Anders (2006). "Historical representation of the wartime accounts of the activities of the OUN–UPA (Organization of Ukrainian Nationalists—Ukrainian Insurgent Army)". East European Jewish Affairs. 36 (2): 163–189. doi:10.1080/13501670600983008. ISSN 1350-1674. S2CID 161270139.
- Rudling, Per A. (2011). "The OUN, the UPA and the Holocaust: A Study in the Manufacturing of Historical Myths". The Carl Beck Papers in Russian and East European Studies (2107). doi:10.5195/CBP.2011.164. ISSN 2163-839X.
- Shkandrij, Myroslav (2015). Ukrainian Nationalism: Politics, Ideology, and Literature, 1929–1956. Yale University Press. ISBN 978-0-300-20628-9.
